= Kennet District =

Former non-metropolitan district in Wiltshire, England

Coordinates: 51.352°N 1.995°W

- Shown within Wiltshire
- History
  - Origin: Municipal Borough of Devizes and Municipal Borough of Marlborough, Marlborough and Ramsbury Rural District, Pewsey Rural District.
  - Created: 1 April 1974
  - Abolished: 1 April 2009
  - Succeeded by: Wiltshire Council
- Status: Non-metropolitan district
- ONS code: 46UB
- Government: Kennet District Council
  - HQ: Devizes

Kennet was a non-metropolitan local government district in Wiltshire, England, abolished as part of the 2009 structural changes to local government. It was named after the River Kennet.

The district was formed on 1 April 1974, under the Local Government Act 1972, by a merger of the municipal boroughs of Devizes and Marlborough, alongside Devizes Rural District, Marlborough and Ramsbury Rural District and Pewsey Rural District.

The district council was based at offices in Devizes. It was abolished on 1 April 2009 as part of the structural changes to local government in England, when its functions were taken over by the new Wiltshire unitary authority.

== Parishes ==
The district contained the following civil parishes:

- Allcannings, Alton, Avebury
- Beechingstoke, Berwick Bassett, Bishops Cannings, Broad Hinton, Bromham, Burbage, Buttermere
- Charlton, Pewsey Vale, Cheverell Magna, Cheverell Parva, Chilton Foliat, Chirton, Chute, Chute Forest, Collingbourne Ducis, Collingbourne Kingston
- Devizes
- East Kennett, Easterton, Easton, Enford, Erlestoke, Etchilhampton, Everleigh
- Fittleton, Froxfield, Fyfield
- Grafton, Great Bedwyn
- Ham, Huish
- Little Bedwyn, Ludgershall
- Manningford, Marden, Market Lavington, Marlborough, Marston, Mildenhall, Milton Lilbourne
- Netheravon, North Newnton
- Ogbourne St Andrew, Ogbourne St George
- Pewsey, Potterne, Poulshot, Preshute
- Ramsbury, Roundway, Rowde, Rushall
- Savernake, Seend, Shalbourne, Stanton St Bernard, Stert
- Tidcombe and Fosbury, Tidworth
- Upavon, Urchfont
- West Lavington, West Overton, Wilcot, Wilsford, Winterbourne Bassett, Winterbourne Monkton, Woodborough, Wootton Rivers, Worton

== See also ==
- Kennet District Council elections
