= Wiltshire Victoria County History =

Encyclopaedic history of the county of Wiltshire in England

The VCH emblem, which includes the coat of arms of England

The Wiltshire Victoria County History, properly called The Victoria History of the County of Wiltshire but commonly referred to as VCH Wiltshire, is an encyclopaedic history of the county of Wiltshire in England. It forms part of the overall Victoria County History of England founded in 1899 in honour of Queen Victoria. With eighteen volumes published in the series, it is now the most substantial of the Victoria County Histories.

== Overview ==
A set of Wiltshire volumes was planned from the start; the authors engaged included Maud Davies, who began writing in 1906. However, the VCH central office ran into financial difficulty in 1908, and although work resumed in 1910 in ten counties, Wiltshire was not among them.

In 1947 the Wiltshire project was revived, leading to publication of the first volume in 1953. For many years the project was chiefly funded by Wiltshire County Council and other Wiltshire local authorities and managed by the Wiltshire Victoria County History Committee.

In 2002 the project became a partnership between the county council (later Wiltshire Council) and the University of the West of England, employing a county editor and an assistant county editor, with offices at the Wiltshire and Swindon History Centre in Chippenham. Beyond writing the history itself, the staff promoted local history by giving talks and presentations to local societies. The chairman of the Wiltshire VCH Committee said in a news release in December 2003: "While the big red volumes are still at the heart of the Wiltshire Victoria County History, we are keen to take our county history out to as many people as possible, through affordable publications, modern technology, and new ways of working".

In 2014 the Wiltshire Victoria County History Committee was wound up because all funding partners had ended their funding, and the continuation of the project became the responsibility of the Wiltshire Victoria County History Trust. Work is expected to proceed more slowly, according to available resources, but will continue to be overseen, and volumes published, by the Institute of Historical Research of the University of London.

== Staff ==
=== List of county editors ===
- 1947–1955: Ralph Bernard Pugh FSA (also General Editor of the Victoria County History from 1949 to 1977)
- G. M. Young (joint editor, to 1953)
- 1956–1977: Elizabeth Crittall
- 1977–2006: Douglas A. Crowley
- 2006–2014: Virginia Bainbridge

=== List of assistant county editors ===
Until 1968, there was only one assistant editor, but after that there were sometimes two.

- Margaret Saunders (to 1959)
- K. H. Rogers (1959 to May 1964)
- Colin Shrimpton (October 1964 to 1965))
- Janet H. Stevenson (July 1966 to 1997)
- Douglas A. Crowley (1968 to 1977)
- Jane Freeman (1978 to 1998)
- Carrie Smith (1999 to 2004)
- Virginia Bainbridge (2004 to 2006)
- James Lee PhD (UWE) (2006 to 2007)
- Alex Craven (2007 to 2014)

== Volumes published ==
=== General volumes ===
- Volume I, Part 1 (1957): Archaeological gazetteer; prehistoric, Pagan Saxon, and early medieval remains.
- Volume I, Part 2 (1973): Settlement and agriculture during the prehistoric, Roman, and Pagan Saxon periods.
- Volume II (1955): Anglo-Saxon Wiltshire, the Wiltshire Domesday, the Wiltshire Geld Rolls, fiefs in the Exon Domesday.
- Volume III (1956): Ecclesiastical history, Roman Catholicism and Protestant Nonconformity, religious houses.
- Volume IV (1959): Economic history, agriculture, industries, roads, canals, railways, taxation, population, sport, spas, freemasonry, royal forests, Cranborne chase.
- Volume V (1957): Medieval government, feudal Wiltshire, parliamentary representation, county government, public health, education.

=== Topographical volumes ===
A series of volumes addresses the history of Wiltshire on a parish-by-parish basis, arranged according to the former hundreds.

- Volume VI (1962): Wilton, Old Salisbury, New Salisbury, and Underditch hundred (Stratford-sub-Castle, Wilsford, Woodford).
- Volume VII (1953): Bradford hundred (Bradford on Avon, including Holt, South Wraxall, Winsley, Limpley Stoke; Broughton Gifford, Great Chalfield, Monkton Farleigh, Wingfield); Melksham hundred (Erlestoke, Hilperton, Melksham – with Beanacre, Shaw and Whitley) – Poulshot, Trowbridge, Whaddon); and Potterne and Cannings hundred (Bromham, Bishop's Cannings, Highway, West Lavington, Potterne, and Rowde).
- Volume VIII (1965): Warminster hundred (Bishopstrow, Corsley, Dinton, Fisherton Delamere, Norton Bavant, Pertwood, Sutton Veny, Teffont Magna, Upton Scudamore, Warminster); Westbury hundred (Westbury); and Whorwellsdown hundred (Steeple Ashton – including West Ashton, Semington and Great Hinton – North Bradley, East Coulston, Edington, Keevil).
- Volume IX (1970): Kingsbridge hundred (Chiseldon, Clyffe Pypard, Draycot Foliat, Hilmarton, Liddington, Lydiard Tregoze, Lyneham, Swindon, Tockenham, Wanborough, Wootton Bassett).
- Volume X (1975): Swanborough hundred (Alton Barnes, Beechingstoke, All Cannings, Charlton, Great Cheverell, Little Cheverell, Chirton, Etchilhampton, Huish, Market Lavington, Manningford Abbots, Manningford Bruce, Marden, North Newnton, Rushall, Stanton St Bernard, Stert, Upavon, Urchfont, Wilcot (with Oare), Wilsford, Woodborough), and Devizes.
- Volume XI (1980): Downton hundred – Bishopstone near Salisbury, Downton, including Barford, Bodenham, Charlton, Hamptworth, Nunton, Standlynch, Wick, Witherington, Fonthill Bishop, East Knoyle, including Hindon; Elstub and Everleigh hundred – Collingbourne Ducis, Enford, Everleigh, Fittleton, Ham, Little Hinton, Netheravon, Overton (including Alton Barnes and Fyfield), Patney, Rollestone, Stockton, Westwood, Wroughton.
- Volume XII (1983): Ramsbury hundred (Bishopstone near Swindon, Ramsbury, including Axford, Baydon); Selkley hundred (Aldbourne, Avebury, Broad Hinton, East Kennett, Mildenhall, Ogbourne St Andrew, Ogbourne St George, Preshute, Winterbourne Bassett, Winterbourne Monkton); and Marlborough.
- Volume XIII (1987): Chalke hundred (Alvediston, Berwick St John, Bower Chalke, Broad Chalke, Ebbesbourne Wake, Fifield Bavant, Semley, Tollard Royal); Dunworth hundred (Ansty, Berwick St Leonard, Chicklade, Chilmark, Donhead St Andrew, Donhead St Mary, Fonthill Gifford, Sedgehill, Swallowcliffe, Teffont Evias, Tisbury).
- Volume XIV (1991): Malmesbury hundred (Bremilham, Brinkworth, Brokenborough, Charlton, Crudwell, Dauntsey, Draycot Cerne, Foxley, Garsdon, Hankerton, Hullavington, Lea and Cleverton, Malmesbury (including Corston and Rodbourne), Norton, Oaksey, Seagry, Great Somerford, Little Somerford, Stanton St Quintin, Sutton Benger, Westport).
- Volume XV (1995): Amesbury hundred (Allington, Amesbury, Boscombe, Bulford, Cholderton, Durnford, Durrington, Figheldean; Ludgershall, including Biddesden; Milston, Newton Tony, North Tidworth); Branch and Dole hundred (Berwick St James, Little Langford, Steeple Langford including Bathampton and Hanging Langford, Maddington, South Newton, Orcheston St Mary, Sherrington, Shrewton, Stapleford, Tilshead, Winterbourne Stoke, Great Wishford, and Wylye).
- Volume XVI (1999): Kinwardstone hundred (Great Bedwyn, Little Bedwyn, Burbage, Buttermere, Chilton Foliat, Chute, Chute Forest, Collingbourne Kingston, Easton, Froxfield, Milton Lilbourne, Pewsey, Savernake, Tidcombe and Fosbury, Hippenscombe, Wootton Rivers).
- Volume XVII (2002): Calne hundred (Berwick Bassett, Blackland; Calne, including Derry Hill, Quemerford, Sandy Lane, Stock, Stockley, Studley, Whetham, and Whitley, Bowood, Calstone Wellington, Cherhill, Compton Bassett, Heddington, Yatesbury).
- Volume XVIII (2011): part of Highworth, Cricklade, and Staple hundred (Ashton Keynes, Cricklade (St Sampson's and St Mary's), Latton, Leigh, Lydiard Millicent, Marston Meysey, Purton, including Braydon; also Minety, which was part of Gloucestershire until 1844.

== Planned publications ==
Three topographical volumes are in preparation:

- Volume XIX: southwest Wiltshire, namely Mere hundred (the town of Mere and the surrounding parishes of Kilmington, West Knoyle, Maiden Bradley, Stourton and Zeals) and the parishes along the Deverill valley, being parts of the hundreds of Heytesbury and South Damerham: Brixton Deverill, Hill Deverill, Horningsham, Kingston Deverill, Longbridge Deverill, Monkton Deverill; and Compton Chamberlayne, detached to the southeast.
- Volume XX: Chippenham and the surrounding parishes of Bremhill, Christian Malford (including the detached hamlet of Avon), Hardenhuish, Kington St Michael (including Kington Langley), Langley Burrell, Pewsham (extra-parochial), and Tytherton Kellaways.
- Volume XXI (begun in 2020): southeast Wiltshire, namely Alderbury hundred (Alderbury, Idmiston, Winterbourne, Laverstock (with Ford), Pitton and Farley, Winterslow, Grimstead, West Dean and Clarendon Park); and Frustfield hundred (Landford and Whiteparish).

Four further volumes will complete the coverage of the county. In no particular order, these will cover:

- The northern parts of the Borough of Swindon, including Highworth
- The Castle Combe and Sherston area
- The Corsham area
- The Heytesbury area, and the Cawden and Cadworth hundred west and south of Salisbury.

== Parishes now in Wiltshire but recorded elsewhere ==
Shalbourne is covered by the History of the County of Berkshire.

South Tidworth, now part of Tidworth parish, is covered by the History of the County of Hampshire.

== Wiltshire Victoria County History Committee (1947–2014) ==
The committee was established in 1947. It did not control the day-to-day work of the staff (who were initially employed by the University of London and later by the University of the West of England), but from the early days of the Wiltshire County History project the committee was responsible for ensuring that funding was available for staff salaries and other expenses, offices provided, and suitable projects undertaken. The members of the Committee represented the main financial contributors to the project (initially these were Wiltshire County Council and other local authorities in Wiltshire, and by 2009 Wiltshire Council and the University of the West of England), and also the Central Committee of the Victoria County History, the University of Winchester, the Wiltshire Archaeological and Natural History Society and the Wiltshire Local History Forum. The Lord Lieutenant of Wiltshire, as Custos rotulorum, was also an honorary member of the Committee.

The Committee was wound up in 2014 after all major contributors had withdrawn their funding for the Wiltshire VCH, so that there were no longer any partners to be represented. At that point, the project was handed over to the Wiltshire VCH Trust, with support from the national organisation of the Victoria County History.

=== Chairmen of the Committee ===
- William Robert Robins OBE (1947–1959)
- J. L. Calderwood CBE (1959–1960)
- S. V. Christie-Miller CBE (1961–1968)
- Sir Henry Langton DSO DSC (1969–1974)
- F. A. Willan CBE, DFC, (1974–1981)
- Nigel J. M. Anderson MC MBE (1981–1985)
- D. J. Matthews (1985–1989)
- V. C. S. Landell-Mills (1989–2001)
- Patricia E. G. Courtman KDC (2001–2002)
- Christopher Newbury (2002–2014)

== Wiltshire Victoria County History Trust ==
The Trust, originally established in 2004 as the Wiltshire Victoria County History Appeal Trust, is a registered charity. Until 2014 it was responsible for raising funds for the work of the VCH beyond its core activities. With effect from February 2014, after the core funding of Wiltshire Council and the University of the West of England had been withdrawn, the Trust took on the whole responsibility for the Wiltshire VCH.

=== Chairmen of the Trust ===
- V. C. S. Landell-Mills (2004 to 2018)
- D. Moss (2018 to date)

== See also ==
- History of Wiltshire
- Wiltshire Historic Buildings Trust
- List of places in Wiltshire
- Wiltshire Archaeological and Natural History Society
- Wiltshire Record Society
- Somerset Victoria County History
