= Robert Hall (British Army officer) =

British Army officer (1939–2016)

Robert Wallace Strachan Hall (4 June 1939 – 17 June 2016) was a British Army officer, rising to the rank of brigadier. After retiring from military service, he became a Conservative politician and was the last Chairman of Wiltshire County Council, then the first to chair its successor authority, Wiltshire Council, from 2009 to 2012; he was also Chairman of the Wiltshire and Swindon Fire Authority. He retired from public life in 2013.

== Early life ==
The son of Brigadier Robert Charles Strachan Hall CBE, late the Royal Regiment of Artillery (1905–1972) and his wife Lillias Smith, Hall was born at Aldershot and educated at Repton School and the Royal Military Academy Sandhurst.

== Military career ==
Hall was commissioned into the Royal Regiment of Artillery as a 2nd Lieutenant on 25 July 1959. He was promoted to captain on 25 July 1965 and to major on 30 June 1971. He retired from the army as a brigadier on 1 March 1993.

During his army career, Hall attended the University of Cambridge and graduated M. Phil.

He went on to become Chairman of the Army and Navy Club, in Pall Mall, London. In retirement, he settled at Manningford Abbots, near Pewsey, Wiltshire.

== Political career ==
Hall was elected to Wiltshire County Council as a Conservative at the elections in 2005. In 2008, he became the last chairman of the Council, which came to an end a year later with the 2009 structural changes to local government in England. He went on to become the first chairman of the successor authority Wiltshire Council, having been elected to it in 2009, representing Pewsey Vale. The same year he also became Chairman of Wiltshire Fire and Rescue Service. He retired as Chairman of Wiltshire Council in May 2012.

After 2009, Hall's Pewsey Vale electoral division included the parishes of Alton, Beechingstoke, Chirton, Charlton, Huish, Manningford, Marden, North Newnton, Patney, Rushall, Stanton St Bernard, Upavon, Wilcot, Wilsford and Woodborough.

As Chairman of the Wiltshire Fire Authority he hosted a visit by the Princess Royal to Salisbury on 10 March 2011.

He retired from public life at the 2013 Wiltshire Council election.

== Honours ==
- Appointed a Serving Brother of the Most Venerable Order of the Hospital of St John of Jerusalem, November 2003.

== Private life ==
In 1964, at Droxford, Hall married Jennifer M. Catley. They had a son, Robert, who has two sons, and a daughter.

Hall took a keen interest in horse racing, and owned race-horses in the 1990s.

He died suddenly aged 77 at home on 17 June 2016, leaving a widow, children, and grandchildren.

== See also ==
Wiltshire County Council's banner

- 2005 Wiltshire County Council election
- 2009 Wiltshire Council election
