= Swanborough Hundred =

Historical division of Wiltshire, England

Coordinates: 51.35°N 1.99°W

Swanborough was a hundred of the English county of Wiltshire, mostly lying in the centre of the county to the south of the town of Devizes. An area of the hundred reached several miles southwards into Salisbury Plain.

The hundred contained the parishes of Alton Barnes, Beechingstoke, All Cannings, Charlton, Great Cheverell, Little Cheverell, Chirton, Etchilhampton, Huish, Market Lavington, Manningford Abbots, Manningford Bruce, Marden, North Newnton, Rushall, Stanton St Bernard, Stert, Upavon, Urchfont, Wilcot, Wilsford, Woodborough, and Devizes.

One of the hundred's meeting-places was Swanborough Tump, a low earthwork in the north of Manningford Abbots parish, near the boundary with Wilcot. The site, now a scheduled monument, is described in the Victoria County History as a bowl barrow but more recently by Historic England as a medieval construction.
