= Beechingstoke =

Village in Wiltshire, England

Coordinates: 51.332°N 1.876°W

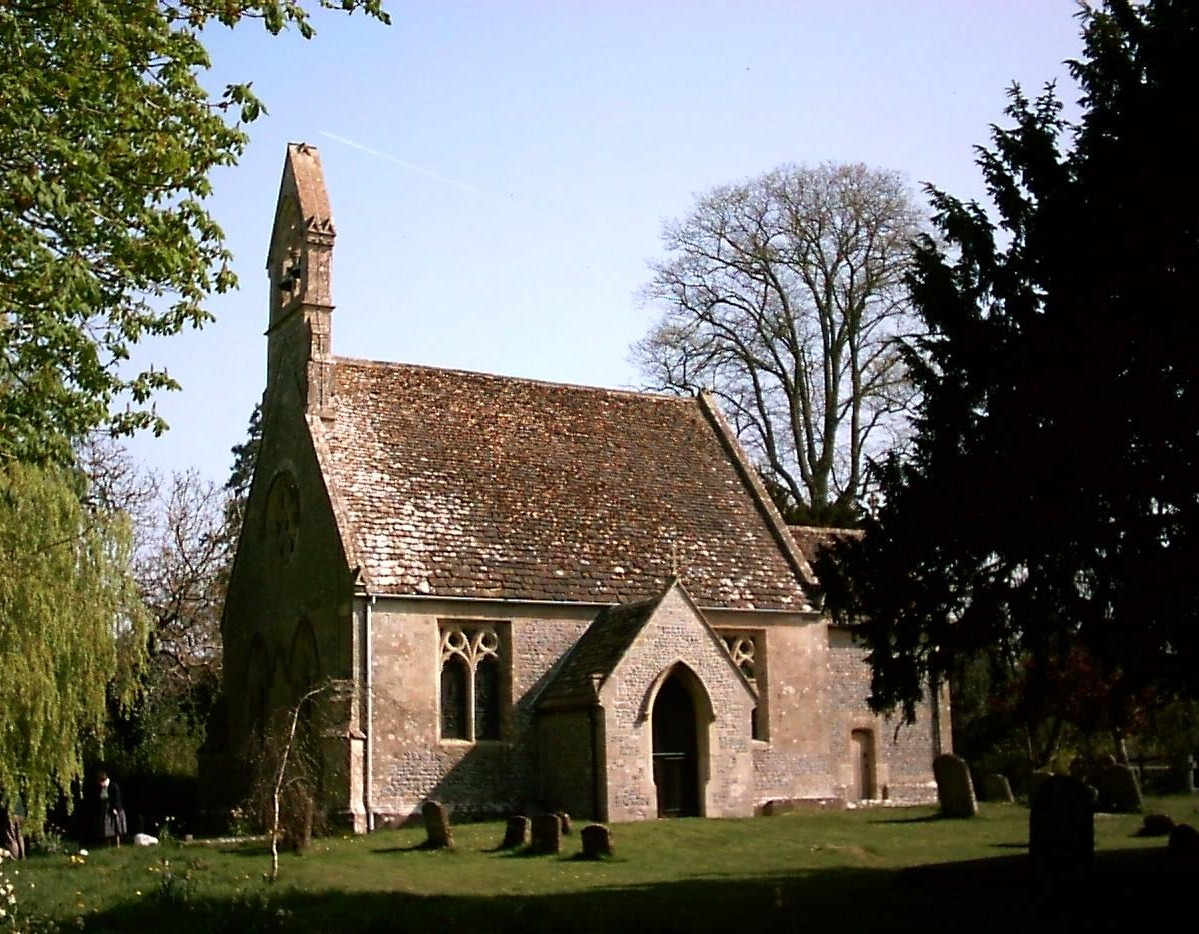
- St Stephen's Church, Beechingstoke, in 2003

- Location within Wiltshire
- Population: 150 (in 2021)
- OS grid reference: SU087592
- Unitary authority: Wiltshire
- Ceremonial county: Wiltshire
- Region: South West
- Country: England
- Sovereign state: United Kingdom
- Post town: PEWSEY
- Postcode district: SN9
- Dialling code: 01672
- Police: Wiltshire
- Fire: Dorset and Wiltshire
- Ambulance: South Western
- UK Parliament: East Wiltshire

Beechingstoke is a small village and civil parish in Wiltshire, England. It lies in the Vale of Pewsey about 5 miles (8 km) west of Pewsey and the same distance east of Devizes. The parish includes the hamlet of Broad Street and the northern part of the village of Bottlesford.

The River Avon and its small tributaries form parts of the west, south and northeast boundaries of the parish.

== History ==
Marden Henge, a large Neolithic earthwork, is just over the south-west border of the parish. The name Beechingstoke apparently derives from the Old English biccestoc meaning 'bitches' place', perhaps referring to a female dog. The Domesday Book of 1086 records a manor called Bichenestock, with 14 households and one mill, held by Shaftesbury Abbey. In 1541 the king transferred the land to the Dean of Winchester, who held it until 1845.

The house known as The Manor (previously Stoke Manor), at the east end of the village, has a west wing from the early 18th century and a later west wing, both in brick under thatched roofs. Stoke Farmhouse, in the centre of the village, is from 1820–1840, in brick and slate with a cast iron porch.

In 1862 the Reading to Taunton railway was built close to Beechingstoke village and became the northern boundary of the parish. There was a station at Woodborough, just outside the parish to the north of Broad Street, but it closed in 1966 making Pewsey the nearest station.

== Parish church ==
The earliest known record of the Church of England parish church of Saint Stephen is from 1291. Of the mediaeval church building, only the 14th-century chancel arch and surrounding wall survive. The nave was rebuilt in 1693 and the chancel in 1791. In 1848 the 1791 east window was moved to Wilsford school and a new 15th-century style one made by Wailes was inserted in the chancel in its place. The church was largely rebuilt again in 1861 under the direction of the architect S.B. Gabriel of Bristol, who altered the east window to a 14th-century style and inserted a new west window. The church is Grade II listed, as is the nearby Old Rectory of c. 1830.

Rectors include Edward Tufnell (1846 to 1858), who was later the first bishop of Brisbane, Australia. The benefice was held in plurality with that of Woodborough with Manningford Bohune from 1951, and in 1961 the benefices were united. Wilcot, Huish and Oare were added to the union in 1972 and a team ministry established; today Beechingstoke is part of the Vale of Pewsey group of churches.

== Local government ==
Beechingstoke is a civil parish with an elected parish council. It is in the area of the Wiltshire Council unitary authority, which is responsible for all significant local government functions.

== Amenities ==
There is no school in the parish. A National school was built near the church shortly before 1859 but closed around 1872 when the school at nearby Woodborough was opened.
