= All Saints' Church, Manningford Bohune =

Church in Manningford Bohune, Wiltshire, England

All Saints' Church
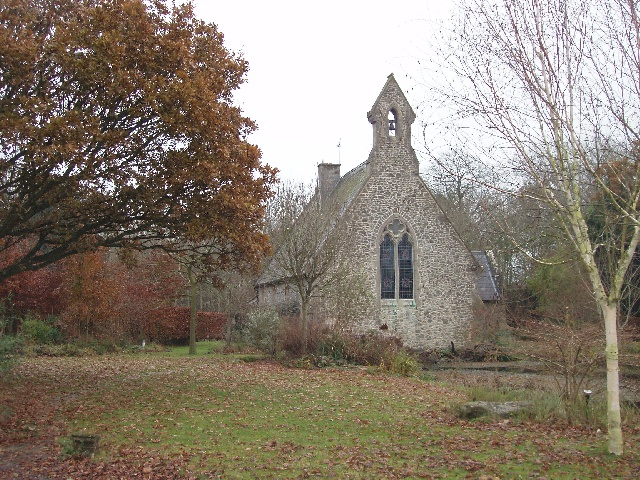

Religion
- Affiliation: Church of England
- Ecclesiastical or organizational status: Closed
- Year consecrated: 1859

Location
- Location: Manningford Bohune, Wiltshire, England
- Interactive map of All Saints' Church
- Coordinates: 51.3316°N 1.8228°W

Architecture
- Architect: Whitley C. Clacy
- Type: Church
- Style: Early English

All Saints' Church is a former Church of England church in Manningford Bohune, Wiltshire, England. Designed by Whitley C. Clacy, the church was built in 1858–59 and declared redundant in 1973. It is now a private residence and has been a Grade II listed building since 1952.

== History ==
All Saints was built as a chapel of ease to St Nicholas in the parish of Wilsford. A church for Manningford Bohune was proposed in 1857 and supported by the rector of Woodborough, Rev. W. T. Wyld. As Manningford Bohune was an outlying part of the parish, the village's residents had to journey two to three miles to reach the parish church. Furthermore, there had been an increase to its population in recent years.

A plot of land was donated by Mr. Henry Jenner of Chisenbury, and funds were raised by voluntary contribution and grants. Rev. George Ernest Howman, the patron of the living and rector of Barnsley, donated £700, Rev. Wyld donated £155 and raised a further £245. A grant of £110 was received from the Incorporated Society and £100 from the Diocesan Society.

The plans for the church were drawn up by Whitley C. Clacy of Devizes and Messrs. May and Sons of Bath hired as the builders, with the architect supervising the construction. The foundation stone was laid by Mrs. Howman on 14 May 1858. Unforeseen extra expense was incurred during the early stage of construction as the foundations had to be laid to a greater depth.

The church, which cost £1,350 to build, was completed on 1 October 1858, and its consecration set for 1 November (All Saints' Day), but this was delayed in order to meet the requirements of the Bishop of Salisbury for the church to hold two services on Sundays. It was consecrated by the Bishop of Salisbury, the Right Rev. Walter Kerr Hamilton, on 1 March 1859.

Changes in 1924 created the parish and benefice of Woodborough with Manningford Bohune by transferring the church and some of the surrounding area from Wilsford to Woodborough. From 1951 the united benefice was held in plurality with Beechingstoke. All Saints was declared redundant by the Church of England on 3 April 1973, and subsequently sold in 1975 and converted into a residence.

== Architecture ==
All Saints is built of Twerton blue lias stone, jointed with grey mortar, with dressings in freestone and a slate roof. It was made up of a nave, chancel, south porch and north vestry. A bellcote containing a single bell was placed on the west end of the church, and a stone cross on the east end. The open roof is made of stained deal. Original fittings included benches of stained deal, a stone font and pulpit, and a prayer desk of oak. The floor was laid with black and red tiles. Rev. Howman gifted the stained glass of the east and west windows.
