= Newnton =

Newnton is part of the name of two villages in England:

- Long Newnton, Gloucestershire
- North Newnton, Wiltshire
