= Swanborough Tump =

Bronze Age barrow in Wiltshire, England

Coordinates: 51.3398°N 1.8142°W

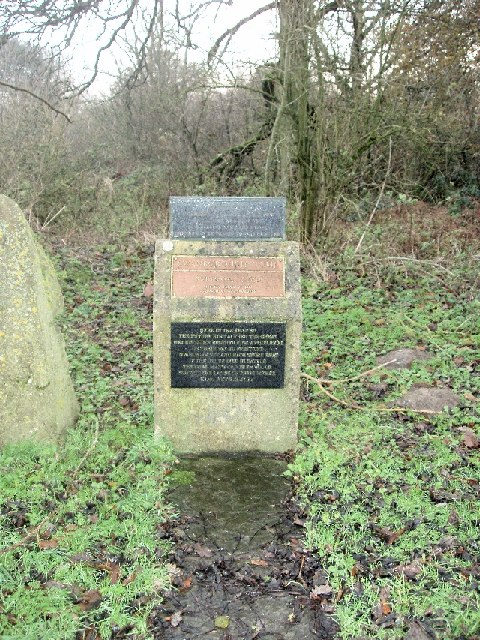
Swanborough Tump marker stone

Swanborough Tump is a mound of earth in Manningford parish, Wiltshire, England. It has been considered to be a bowl barrow dating from the Bronze Age and is listed as a scheduled monument.

The mound was the meeting place of the ancient Swanborough Hundred and has been linked with the "Swanabeorh" of a 987 AD Saxon charter titled 'Barrow of the peasants'. Although recorded by Leslie Grinsell as a bowl barrow, the structure is untypical of a prehistoric burial mound and may instead have been built as a meeting-place during the Middle Ages.

This location is also significant as it was chosen in A.D. 871 as the meeting place for King Aethelred and his brother, the future King Alfred the Great on their way to fight the Danes. They promised each other that if one of them should die then the dead man's children would inherit land belonging to their father King Aethelwulf. A stone monument and plaque at the site commemorate this event.

The tump has two summits, suggesting that it may consist of two mounds or that the centre of the mound has been damaged by human activity later in its history. The archaeologists Sarah Semple and Alex Langlands carried out a survey of the earthworks in 1999 to create an accurate record of the tump's extent.
