= Bottesford =

Bottesford may refer to:

- Bottesford, Leicestershire, England
- Bottesford, Lincolnshire, England

== See also ==
- Bottlesford, Wiltshire, England
