= Marden Henge =

Neolithic henge in Wiltshire, England

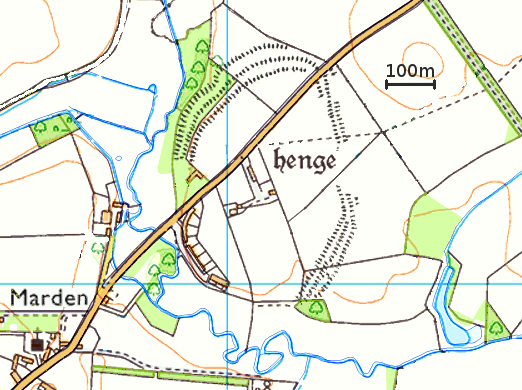
- Map of Marden Henge

- Location within Wiltshire
- 51.3233°N 1.8712°W
- Type: Henge
- Periods: Neolithic
- Location: Marden, Wiltshire
- OS grid reference: SU091582

Marden Henge (also known as Hatfield Earthworks) is the largest Neolithic henge enclosure discovered to date in the United Kingdom. The monument is north-east of the village of Marden, Wiltshire, within the Vale of Pewsey and between the World Heritage Sites of Avebury and Stonehenge.

== Description ==
The circular enclosure consists of a circular depression and a central platform. The platform is lower than the surrounding ground and its position is shifted northward. The enclosure is roughly oval in shape, and is enclosed by a typical bank and internal ditch arrangement constructed on the east, north and north-west sides and by the River Avon to the south and west. Its greatest width is 530 metres (1,740 ft) and it encompasses an area of 14 hectares (35 acres), and it is under the care of English Heritage. Antiquarian accounts of the site describe a huge mound within the enclosure called Hatfield Barrow, which collapsed after excavation by William Cunnington in the early 19th century. Today, Marden Henge has been damaged by ploughing, and no longer has any standing stones.

Around 1 kilometre (0.6 mi) to the south, archaeologists have detected the presence of another henge known as Wilsford Henge.

== Historical context ==
Development of the Neolithic earthworks, now known as henges, began in the second half of the fourth millennium B.C. Their purpose is more likely to have been ceremonial/religious rather than defensive.

The wall of Marden Henge was composed of irregular embankments, and there was a moat inside it which divided the interior into four areas. Studies show that there may be no traces of construction on the southwest and south sides of Marden Henge; instead, the steep banks of the River Avon serve as the boundary.

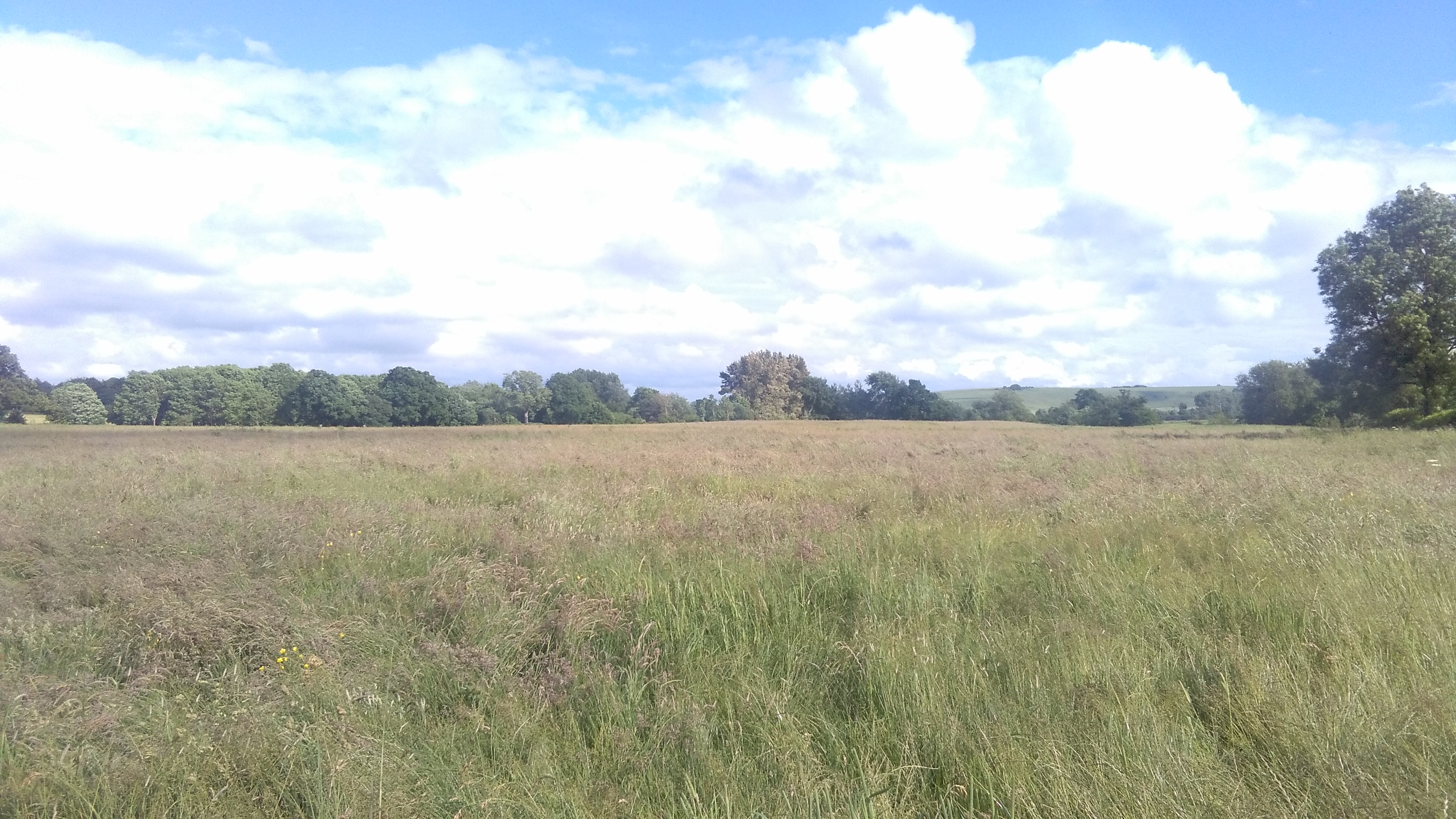
Marden Henge – middle, c. 2016

The henge is an irregular oval walled area measuring 1,700 feet (520 m) north to south and 1,200 feet (370 m) east to west, on the north bank of the River Avon, approximately 6 miles (9.7 km) upstream of Durrington Walls. Many antlers and a human skeleton were found during excavations at the site, which may have had some ceremonial significance, like other sites in the area such as Avebury.

However, Marden Henge lacks typical megalithic structures, instead adopting a wooden structure. Excavations in 1969 uncovered a circular wooden structure about 10.5 meters in diameter inside the enclosure, which consisted of a ring of column holes and was thought to have had a ceremonial function. At the same time, fragments of grooved ware were found beneath the wooden structure, which also suggests a possible ritual function.

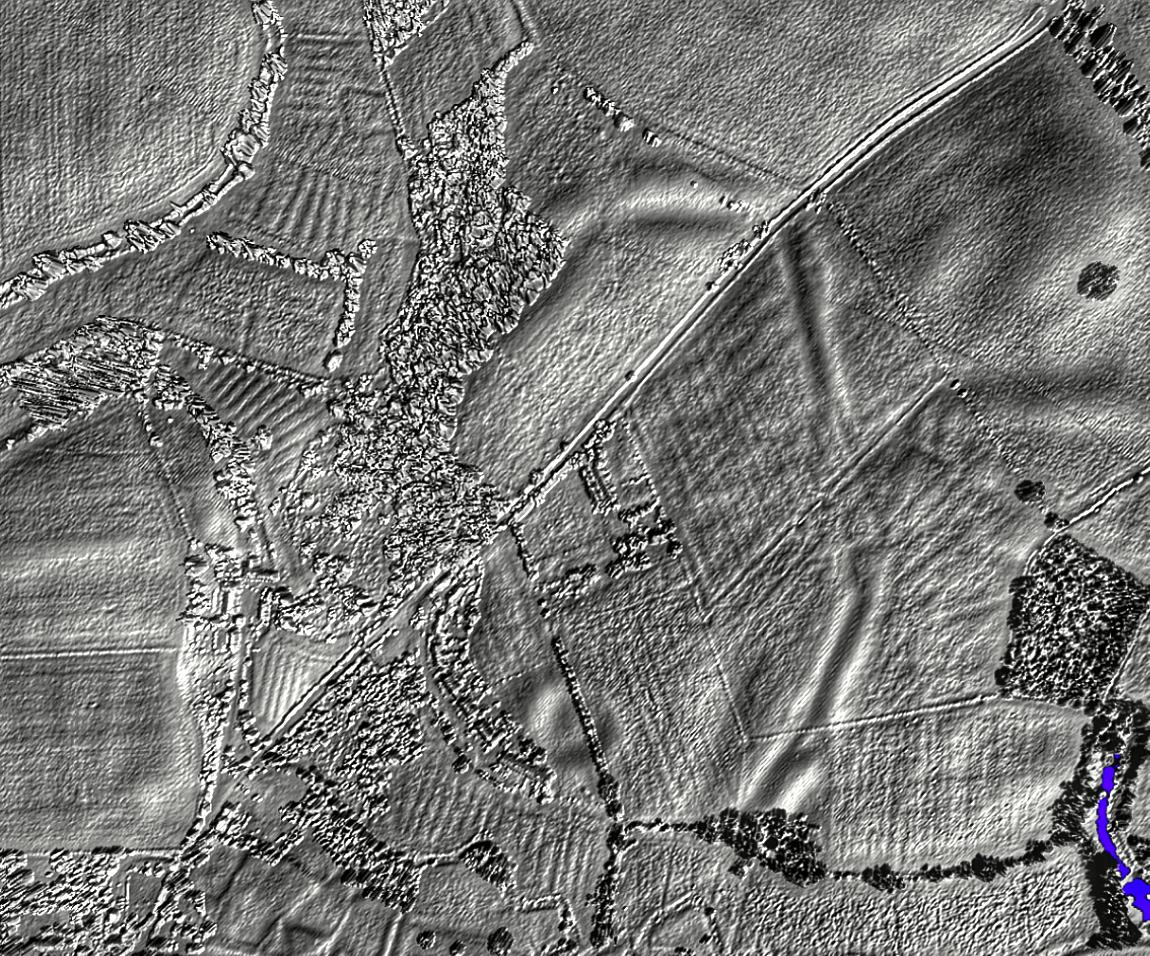
A lidar view of the henge and other features.

Through the analysis of soil samples, archaeologists have found that the use of the site predates the construction of the earth embankment by 600–700 years. This is based on measurement of the soil layer, which dates the construction of the embankment to 1988±48 BC, while the soil layer is dated to 2654±59 BC.

In 1807, Sir Richard Colt Hoare wrote about his visit to Marden and formed an opinion that the henge was a religious project rather than a defensive one.

== Archaeological discoveries ==
Although Marden Henge is the largest known henge in the UK, the site remains relatively unexplored. While similar henge sites are readily recognisable in the landscape, Marden has few surface features. Unlike other henges, Marden has two asymmetrical entrances, one on the northern side of the wall and the other on the eastern side.

Hatfield Barrow is a mound within the enclosure. A record in 1776 stated that Hatfield Barrow was approximately 30 feet tall and was surrounded by a huge trench that tilted outward, indicating that the mound was not used for military defence purposes. The barrow ruins show evidence of collapse, which might be due to early theft or natural subsidence. In 1818, Hoare attempted to investigate the remains, but the ruins had been completely flattened, and all traces had been lost.

Road work led to a study of Durrington Walls by archaeologists in 1966–1967, leading to further research at Marden Henge in 1969, when Geoffrey Wainwright conducted a preliminary excavation. The study was to compare it with the Durrington Walls and focussed on the northern entrance. The investigation confirmed a Neolithic date for the site, carbon dating of pottery indicated that construction continued up to the Late Neolithic period.

Remote sensing is limited at Marden henge by the underground soil layer and historical mole activity. The site is on a floodplain near the River Avon, an area with a high water table, only about 3 meters from the north entrance of Marden, a location that places Marden at the farthest end of the flood zone. Due to the sedimentation of the river, it is likely that there are some preserved remains in the area near the river.

Excavation started at the north entrance, and two 30-foot areas 100 feet from the entrance were cleared. This was the same strategy as used at Durrington Walls, and the researchers hoped to find similarities between the two sites. The excavation revealed the gully was more than 50 feet wide, but only six feet deep. Many pottery shards, antler picks and animal bones were found near the gully, suggesting that the site had been used by humans.

Excavations revealed similarities between Marden's wooden structures and those at nearby Durrington Walls site. A 32-foot diameter circular hole was found at Marden, with three additional sets of holes in the centre of the circle. Hundreds of years of farming have resulted in the destruction of all the soil in the upper layers of the site, with only the lower levels preserved. Two Mesolithic flint tools and a bronze brooch from the Romano-British period were also found at the site.

== Excavation history ==
In 1807, the antiquarians Sir Richard Colt Hoare and William Cunnington conducted excavations of Marden Henge.

In 1929, O. G. S. Crawford compared Marden Henge with other Neolithic sites and concluded that Marden belonged to the same period as Durrington Walls and Avebury.

In 1936, Professor J. G. D. Clark suggested that Marden Henge belonged to the Stonehenge group, but there was little evidence of internal structure compared to Stonehenge.

In 1951, Professor R. J. C. Atkinson suggested that Marden Henge belonged to a suspicious site in the Stonehenge site, and hypothesized that if Marden Henge belonged to Stonehenge, it would be the largest presence of its kind.

In 1969, due to the need for road construction, the Department of Public Buildings and Works carried out an excavation at Marden Henge, which uncovered the remains of earth embankments and wooden structures.

In 1970, during excavations at Marden Henge, many pottery shards, animal bones and other remains were found at the north entrance, a discovery that confirmed the site's association with Neolithic grooved ware.

In the early 2010s, a further study of Marden Henge revealed that it could have been larger than discovered, and several hypotheses were made about the site's role.

In 2010, excavations at Marden Henge uncovered a 4,500-year-old house, which was probably owned by a priest, with fresh flintstones and pottery shards found on the site.

From 2015 to 2018, Amanda Clarke and Jim Leary of the University of Reading conducted a three-year research project on Marden Henge.

== Unearthed artifacts ==
=== Human skeleton ===
Researchers found human remains in Marden Henge, and the study proved that the bones belonged to a young man. The skull of the remains had been crushed, and investigation of the skull revealed clear lines, suggesting that it may be female. However, the sex of the human remains cannot be ascertained because of the absence of a gender-discerning pelvis. The present condition of the bones reflects the lack of nutrition in the person during childhood, and there is a significant lack of calcium.

=== Animal skeleton ===
The researchers found a total of 320 animal bones at Marden Henge, including species such as cattle, pigs, sheep, horses, red deer and bison. A study of the size of these bones showed that Marden Henge's pigs and cattle were similar in size to those at Durrington Walls, a nearby site. In addition, the researchers found 13 sheep bones in Marden Henge trench 4, and only eight specimens from horses and red deer. This discovery demonstrates the characteristics of Neolithic animal husbandry, in which cattle and pigs were dominant and sheep were secondary.

=== Tools of production ===
Picks and rakes were found during the excavation, but due to the high water table inside the ruins, the tools were in a fragile state. Observation of these tools found that the pick had a certain wear and polishing.

=== Bronze ware ===
Excavations at Marden Henge also found a round brooch made of copper with six raised patterns on its surface, of the Romano-British type.

== Geophysical survey findings ==
Investigation using a magnetometer has been part of Marden henge's physical exploration. Although this technology identified some magnetic anomalies within the site area, the link to the underground structures was not obvious. Most of the detected magnetic anomalies are related to modern disturbances, such as iron pipes, barbed wire fences, vehicle running marks, and traces of sheep movement, etc.

In addition to physical techniques, aerial photography also played a key role in investigation of the site. Aerial images from the 1940s recorded the boundaries of the fields surrounding Marden henge and the adjacent wetlands, and the orientation of this boundary was most likely influenced by the river. This discovery proves that the wall of Marden henge might not have been closed, and in its southern part near the river, the earthen embankment and moat might have been in its original form.

== Ritual and symbolic functions ==
In 2010, a further archaeological investigation brought about many discoveries. At the former Hatfield Barrow site, archaeologists discovered ashes, hazelnut shells, burned bone fragments, etc., all of which indicate traces of human activities in this area.

Two fire piles were also discovered inside the wall and in the northeastern part. The fire piles and the building formed a structure like a sauna room, which was also suspected to have been used in some kind of purification ritual.

== Comparative significance within the henge tradition ==
Marden henge, along with Avebury, Durrington Walls and Mount Pleasant, constitute the four known super-large henges in the UK. As the largest henge ruins known in the UK at present, Marden is far larger in scale than Avebury and Durrington Walls. Compared with the other three, Marden henge has no huge stones. Instead, it is mainly made of earth and some wooden structures. The layout of Marden henge is also significantly different from the other three. The enclosures of the Avebury and Durrington Walls ruins are nearly circular, reflecting the form of the surrounding terrain. However, the shape of Marden henge's enclosure is not symmetrical and forms a certain response with the river.

Marden henge is close to the River Avon, and part of the wall directly utilizes the river as the boundary line. Richards (1996) said that Marden henge has a very close relationship with the circular building and the river. In addition, this site relying on the edge of the river might also represent a metaphor and can be regarded as an imitation of the river cliff. This indicates that Marden henge may embody a unique understanding of water sources, terrain and space. In consequence, a comparison with other henges reveals that Marden places greater emphasis on integration with the natural landscape.

== Archaeology ==
The area was designated as a scheduled monument in 1953. The site was excavated by Geoff Wainwright in 1969; he excavated the north entrance and found a timber circle, and Grooved ware pottery, similar to Durrington Walls. The finds are at Wiltshire Museum in Devizes, where there is also a small display.

In 2010, the henge and surrounding area were investigated through aerial, geophysical, and field survey. During the dig, a Neolithic building was discovered, described as the best preserved Neolithic building in England.

The site is included in a three-year investigation of the Pewsey Vale, beginning in 2015, by the Department of Archaeology at the University of Reading.
