= Samuel Burleigh Gabriel =

- Born: 11 August 1816; Bristol, England
- Died: 26 June 1865 (aged 48); Bristol, England
- Occupation: Architect
- Practice: Hicks and Gabriel

Samuel Burleigh Gabriel (11 August 1816 – 26 June 1865) was a Victorian architect who practised in Bristol, England. For a number of years he was in partnership with another architect, John Hicks, who later worked at Dorchester. Their offices were at 28 Corn Street, Bristol.

Gabriel designed parish churches for the Church of England and houses for private clients.

One of Gabriel's last commissions was Ashley House in Bristol for Sir Charles Wathen. Wathen served as Mayor of Bristol and contributed to the building of several of its public buildings. In 2008 there was a proposal to demolish Ashley House and SAVE Britain's Heritage responded by supporting a campaign for the building's retention.

== Works ==
- St. Mark's parish church, Easton, Bristol, 1843–48
- St. Simon the Apostle parish church, Baptist Mills, Bristol, 1845–48
- St. Jude the Apostle with St. Matthias-on-the-Weir parish church, Old Market, Bristol, 1845–49
- St. Michael the Archangel parish church, Two-Mile-Hill, Bristol, 1846–49
- St. Anne's parish church, Bowden Hill, Wiltshire, 1856
- St. Mary's parish church, West Kington, Wiltshire, 1856
- Chew Stoke School, Chew Stoke, Somerset, 1858
- St. Michael the Archangel parish church, Compton Martin, Somerset: restoration, 1858–59
- St. John the Evangelist parish church, Clifton, Bristol, 1858–69
- St. Paul's parish, Southville, Bristol: vicarage, 1860
- St. Stephen's parish church, Beechingstoke, Wiltshire: restoration, 1860–61
- St. Michael the Archangel parish church, Dundry, Somerset: rebuilding, 1860–62
- Parish church, Manningford Abbots, Wiltshire: rebuilding, 1861–64
- St. James' parish church, Cherhill, Wiltshire: restoration, 1863
- Ashley House, Ashley, Bristol, 1865–66

== Sources and further reading ==
- "Ashley House, Ashley Down Road, Bristol BS7 9BG". Ashley Grange Residents' Association.
- Brodie, Antonia; Felstead, Alison; Franklin, Jonathan; Pinfield, Leslie; Oldfield, Jane, eds. (2001). Directory of British Architects 1834–1914, A–K. London & New York: Continuum. ISBN 0-8264-5513-1.
- Pevsner, Nikolaus; Cherry, Bridget (revision) (1975). The Buildings of England: Wiltshire. Harmondsworth: Penguin Books. ISBN 0-14-071026-4.
