= Bottlesford =

Village in Wiltshire, England

Coordinates: 51.332°N 1.839°W

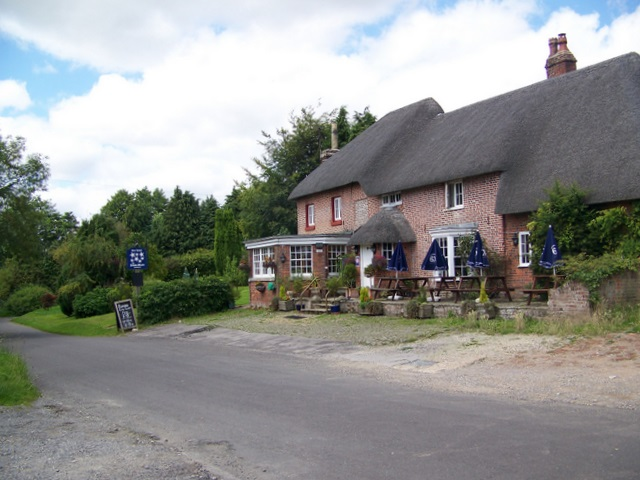
- The Seven Stars, Bottlesford

- Location within Wiltshire
- OS grid reference: SU113592
- Civil parish: North Newnton
- Unitary authority: Wiltshire
- Ceremonial county: Wiltshire
- Region: South West
- Country: England
- Sovereign state: United Kingdom
- Post town: Pewsey
- Postcode district: SN9
- Dialling code: 01672
- Police: Wiltshire
- Fire: Dorset and Wiltshire
- Ambulance: South Western
- UK Parliament: East Wiltshire

Bottlesford is a small village in Wiltshire, England, in the parish of North Newnton. It is in the Vale of Pewsey and is about 3 miles (4.8 km) west of Pewsey. There is a pub, the Seven Stars Inn.

The Berks and Hants Extension Railway, opened from Hungerford to Devizes in 1862, passes north of Bottlesford. Sometime after 1958 the boundary of Woodborough parish was moved south to follow the railway, transferring the north end of Bottlesford into Woodborough. The properties immediately north of the railway are labelled as Free Trade on a 1958 map, but that name is not used today.

Until sometime after 1971, Bottlesford was within Manningford parish, in the tithing of Manningford Bohune which had been part of Wilsford parish until 1871.
