= Wilsford Henge =

Neolithic henge monument in Wiltshire, England

- Location within Wiltshire
- 51.31496°N 1.86787°W
- Type: Henge
- Periods: Neolithic
- Location: Wilsford, Wiltshire
- OS grid reference: SU09305732

Wilsford Henge is the site of a Neolithic henge, west of the village of Wilsford, Wiltshire in the United Kingdom (grid reference SU09305732). The site was discovered from cropmarks in aerial photographs. The monument lies within the Vale of Pewsey, a short distance south of the large henge known as Marden Henge.

== Description ==
Wilsford Henge is a broad irregular circular ditch visible only as a cropmark on aerial photographs, on a gently sloping spur of land about 500m south of the River Avon. The internal diameter of the enclosure is around 43 metres and the external diameter is around 62 metres. There is an entrance, 12 metres wide, which faces northeast in the direction of the river. An interior circle of possible post-hole pits has been confirmed by geophysical survey. Around 1 kilometre in a north by northwest direction lies Marden Henge, on the opposite bank of the river.

== Archaeology ==
The site was included in a three-year investigation of the Pewsey Vale, beginning in 2015, by the Department of Archaeology at the University of Reading. Among the discoveries in the 2015 excavations was an early Bronze Age crouched burial of an adolescent child which included sherds of beaker pottery and a collection of necklace beads.

Nearby, within the same field, archaeologists have discovered the remnants of a large Roman farm settlement, and excavations have revealed the outline of a large farm building or barn.
