= Woodborough railway station =

Former railway station in England

Woodborough
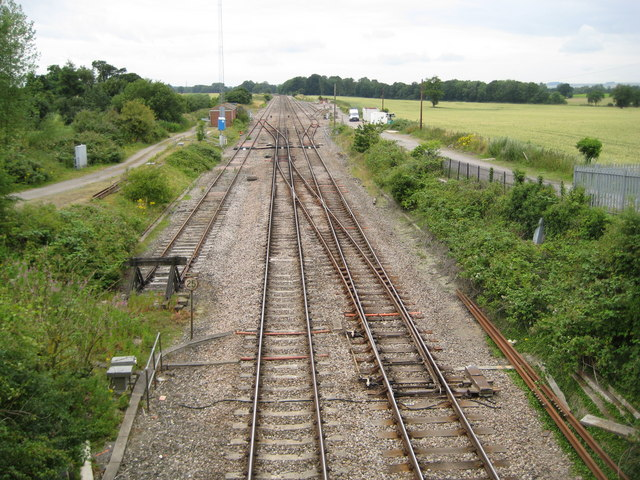
- Woodborough Sidings, the site of the former station

General information
- Location: Woodborough, Wiltshire; England
- Coordinates: 51.33516°N 1.85106°W
- Platforms: 2

Other information
- Status: Disused

History
- Original company: Great Western Railway
- Post-grouping: Great Western Railway

Key dates
- 1862: Opened
- 1966: Closed
Location

Woodborough railway station is a former railway station in Woodborough, Wiltshire, UK on the Reading to Taunton line. The line opened in 1862, providing a link to Devizes. The station closed in 1966 as part of the Beeching cuts. Today the line is still in use and the station's sidings remain in place.

Preceding station	Historical railways	Following station
Manningford Halt; Line open, station closed	Great Western Railway; Berks and Hants Railway	Patney and Chirton; Line open, station closed
