= Stert =

Coordinates: 51.333°N 1.957°W

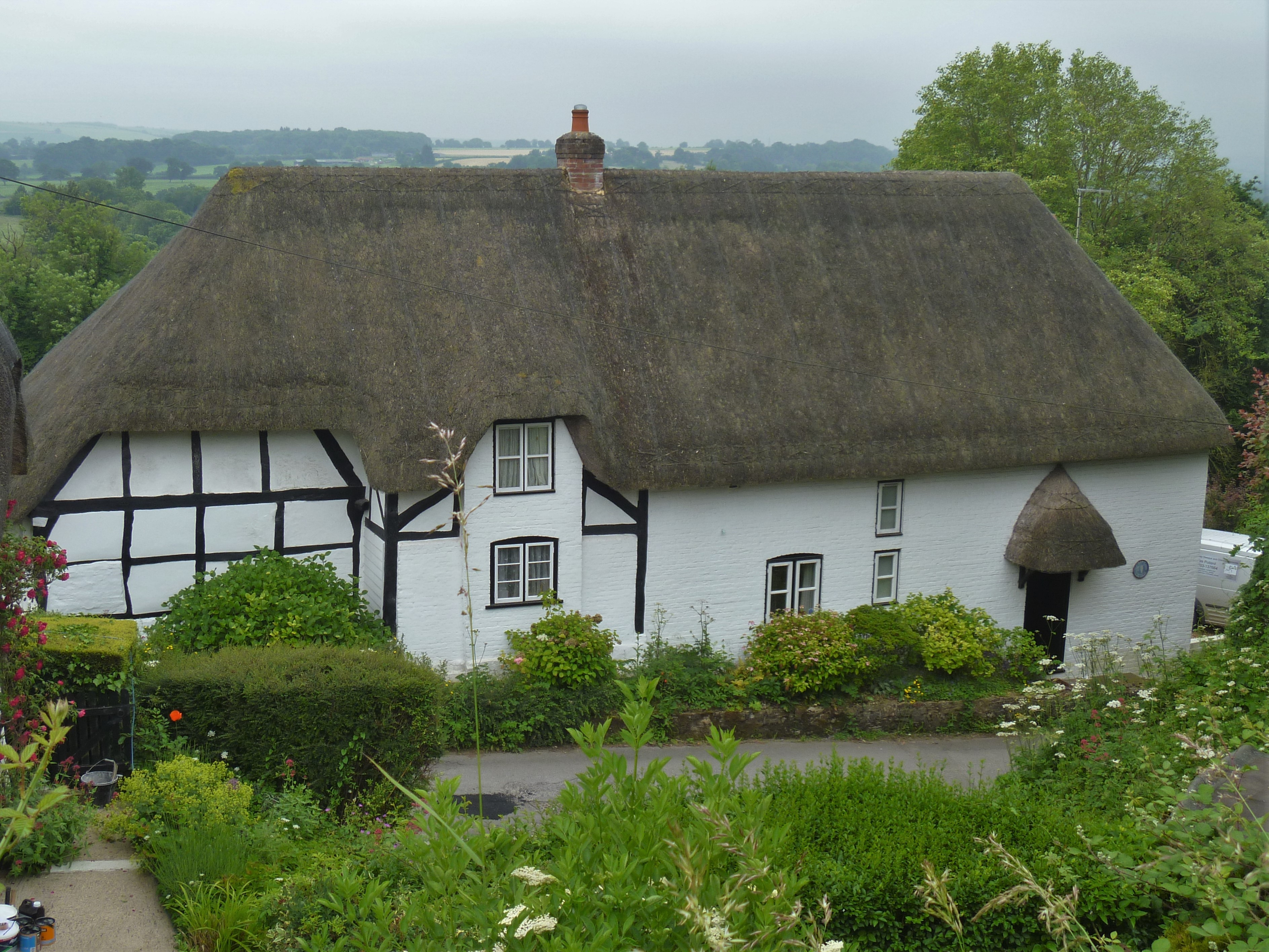
- Barn Cottage, Stert

- Location within Wiltshire
- Population: 176 (in 2011)
- OS grid reference: SU031594
- Unitary authority: Wiltshire
- Ceremonial county: Wiltshire
- Region: South West
- Country: England
- Sovereign state: United Kingdom
- Post town: Devizes
- Postcode district: SN10
- Dialling code: 01380
- Police: Wiltshire
- Fire: Dorset and Wiltshire
- Ambulance: South Western
- UK Parliament: Melksham and Devizes
- Website: Parish

Stert is a village and civil parish in Wiltshire, England. Its nearest town is Devizes, about 2 miles (3.2 km) away to the northwest.

The village is south of the A342 Devizes – Andover road. The Wayside Monument (previously known as The Long Monument) stands at the roadside, just over the border in Etchilhampton parish. It was erected in 1771 and dedicated to James Long of Wedhampton, who had promoted the diversion of the road to a more southerly route, avoiding Etchilhampton Hill.

== History ==
Stert, in Swanborough Hundred, was recorded as having 22 households in the 1086 Domesday Book. In 1393 William of Wykeham, Bishop of Winchester, conveyed the manor to New College, Oxford who retained ownership until the middle of the 20th century.

The Manor Farmhouse, next to the church, is from the 17th century and late 18th.

A school was built in the village in 1842 and attended by children of all ages. The school closed in 1927 after a decline in the local population.

A tithing called Fullaway or Fullway was anciently a detached part of All Cannings parish. When civil parishes were created in the 19th century it was deemed extra-parochial, then in 1857 became a civil parish, and was absorbed into Stert parish in 1894. In 1870 the area had a population of 20, in four houses.

The Wessex Ridgeway, the long-distance National Trail from Marlborough to Lyme Regis, passes through the Eastern edge of the village.

== Religious sites ==
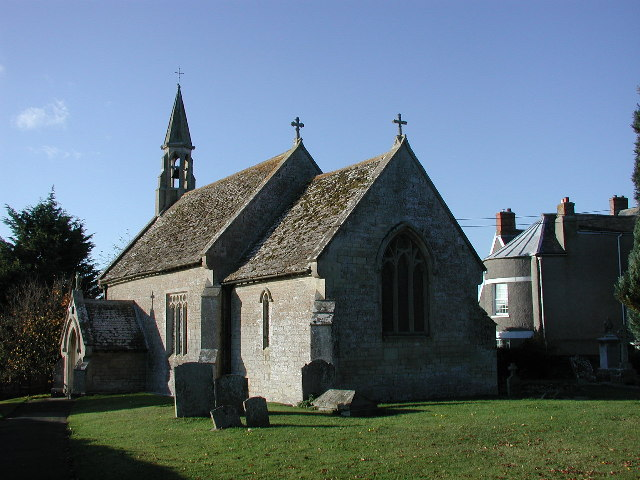
Church of St James

A chapel at Stert is first mentioned c. 1232 and it has always been a chapelry of Urchfont parish. The church of St James stands on the highest ground in the parish. In 1846, to increase its capacity it was largely rebuilt by J.H. Hakewill, in coursed limestone rubble with ashlar dressings, on the same plan and retaining the Perpendicular north aisle. Above the west end is a slim octagonal bell-turret, with a spire. The font, also of 1846, was designed and carved in Neo-Norman style by the curate, J. F. Stuart; Nikolaus Pevsner calls it a "tour de force".

Today the parish is part of the Cannings and Redhorn group, alongside seven others in neighbouring villages.

A Methodist chapel was built in the village c. 1869 and sold to the Devizes Baptists in 1887. The chapel closed in 1957 and passed into residential use.

== Railways ==
The Berks and Hants Extension Railway was built through the parish, passing close to the north of Stert village, for the GWR in 1862. This provided a route from Hungerford via Pewsey to Devizes, where trains continued westward on the 1857 line. In 1900 the GWR built the Stert and Westbury Railway, which diverged from the earlier line near Patney, east of Stert parish, and later formed part of the parish's southern boundary. This line avoided the hill at Devizes to make a direct route to Westbury and southwest England; in 1906 it became part of the Reading to Taunton Line.

The line through Devizes closed in 1966 and was dismantled, while the 1900 line is still in use.

The nearest station was Patney and Chirton, north of Patney village, which was open from 1900 to 1966. A new station for the Devizes area was proposed in 2018, to be sited at Lydeway, south-east of Stert village, where the line is crossed by the A342. In 2023 a feasibility study for Devizes Gateway station, as it came to be called, was being led by National Rail with assistance from Wiltshire Council and Devizes Development Partnership.
