= Manningford =

Civil parish in Wiltshire, England

Coordinates: 51.319°N 1.803°W

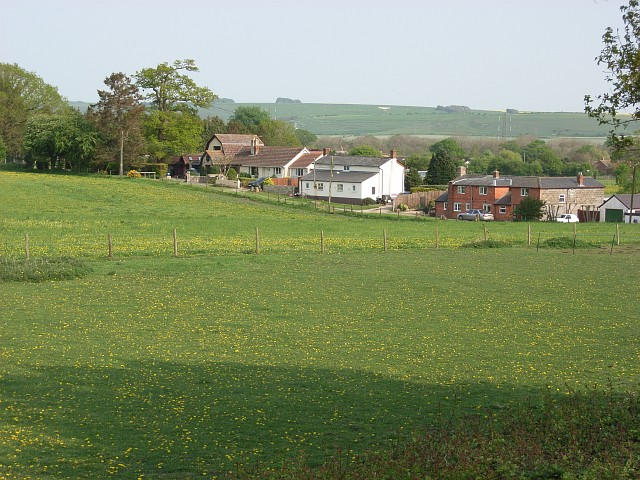
- Manningford Bruce

- Location within Wiltshire
- Population: 405 (in 2011)
- OS grid reference: SU138578
- Civil parish: Manningford
- Unitary authority: Wiltshire
- Ceremonial county: Wiltshire
- Region: South West
- Country: England
- Sovereign state: United Kingdom
- Post town: Pewsey
- Postcode district: SN9
- Dialling code: 01672
- Police: Wiltshire
- Fire: Dorset and Wiltshire
- Ambulance: South Western
- UK Parliament: East Wiltshire
- Website: The Manningfords

Manningford is a civil parish in Wiltshire, England. The parish includes the villages of Manningford Abbots, Manningford Bohune and Manningford Bruce, and the hamlet of Manningford Bohune Common, together known as the Manningfords.

The parish is in the Vale of Pewsey which carries the upper section of the Salisbury Avon. Pewsey is about 2 miles (3.2 km) to the northeast; the nearest towns are Marlborough, 8 miles (13 km) northeast, and Devizes, 9 miles (14 km) to the west. The parish is long and narrow in shape, stretching from the Salisbury Avon valley in the northwest to higher downland towards Upavon, on the northern edge of Salisbury Plain. The A345 Pewsey–Upavon road passes to the south of the three villages.

== History ==
=== Manningford Abbots or Abbas ===
The eastern third of the parish, so-called from its ownership by the Abbot of Hyde Abbey, Winchester. The Abbot held it, together with the chapelry at Alton Priors, until the Dissolution of the Monasteries. In 1547 it went to the Seymour family (Dukes of Somerset and then Northumberland) until it was split up in 1768.

In 1428 there were fewer than ten households; by 1801 the population rose to 131, and to 165 by 1831. In 1931, shortly before Manningford Abbots was amalgamated with the other two parishes, the population was 121.

=== Manningford Bohune ===
The western third of the parish, held by Amelric de Drewes in 1086. The name is from Humphrey de Bohun in the 12th century (related to the Bohun Earls of Hereford). Formerly a detached tithing of Wilsford parish, lying about 2 1/2 miles (4.0 km) east of Wilsford village. In 1801 the population of the tithing was 163, rising to 283 in 1841. Wilsford and Manningford Bohune became separate civil parishes in 1871.

The northwestern boundary of the tithing was the Woodborough stream, a tributary of the Avon; thus Bottlesford hamlet was within Manningford Bohune. At some point after 1971, boundary changes moved Bottlesford into North Newnton parish and transferred land north of the railway into Woodborough parish.

=== Manningford Bruce ===
The central third of the parish, held by Grimbald the Goldsmith in 1086, named after the Norman William de Breuse in 1275. The site of a Roman villa is near the church.

The population was 213 in 1801, increasing to 275 in 1851, then declining to reach 194 in 1931. A small schoolroom was built c. 1841 in the south of the village; in 1881 around 80 pupils attended, including children from Abbots. Numbers declined in the 1970s and the school closed in 1977.

== Swanborough Tump ==
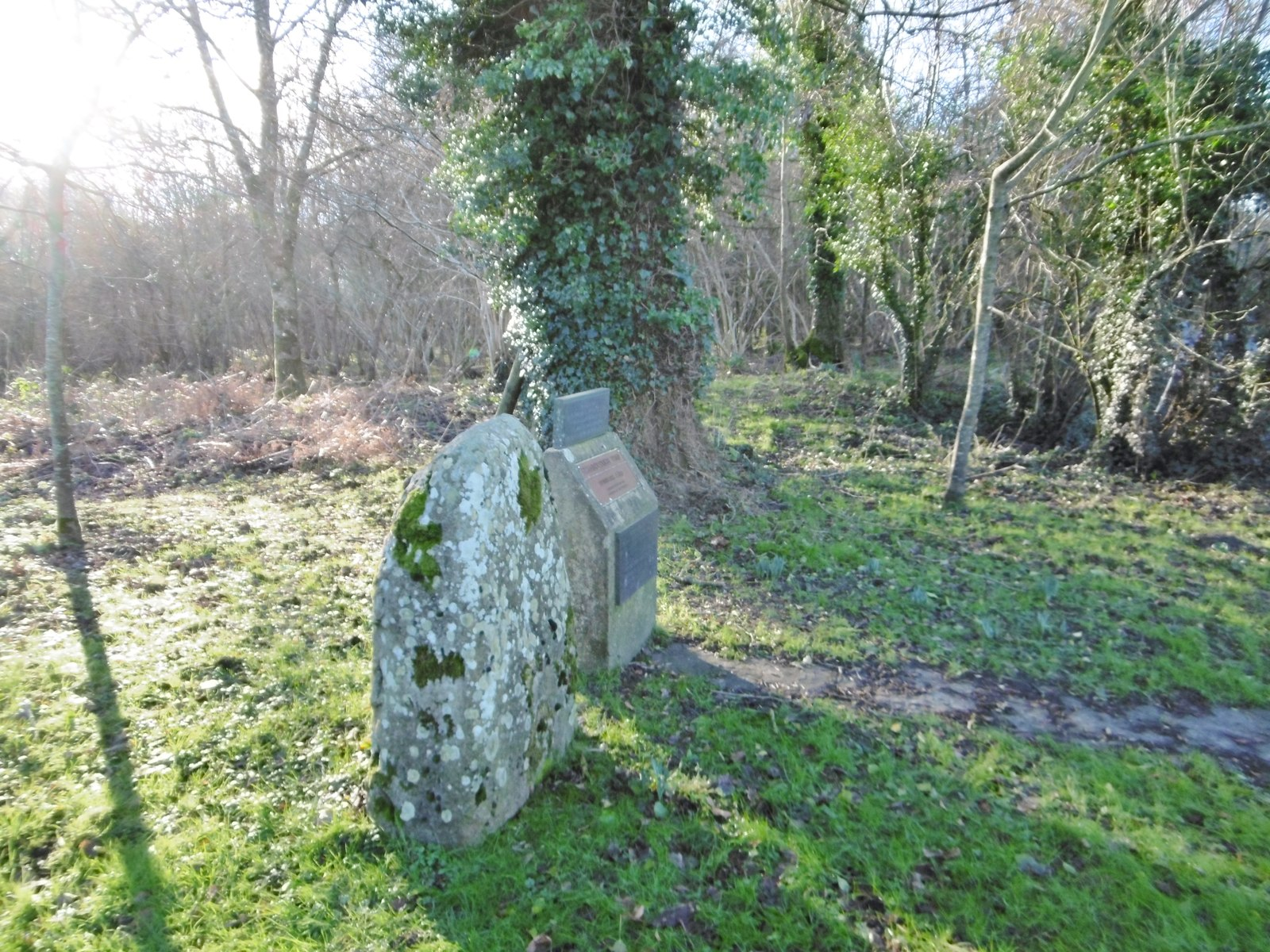
Markers near Swanborough Tump

The ancient parishes of Abbots and Bruce, and possibly Bohune, were within Swanborough Hundred. One of the hundred's meeting-places was Swanborough Tump, a low earthwork in the north of Abbots parish, near the boundary with Wilcot. The site, now a scheduled monument, is described in the Victoria County History as a bowl barrow but more recently by Historic England as a medieval construction. The tump was on an important east–west road.

In the 20th century a stone with plaques was erected at the roadside near the tump, next to an unidentified older stone.

== Religious sites ==
=== Parish church ===
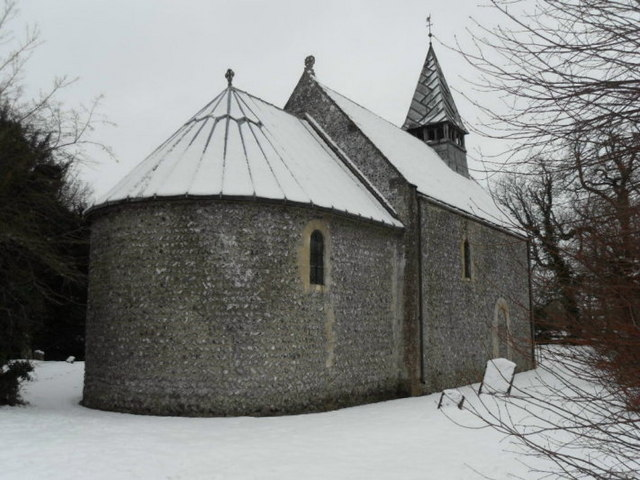
Church of St Peter, Manningford Bruce

The parish church of Saint Peter at Manningford Bruce was described by Pevsner as "a very completely preserved Norman church". The aisleless nave and the chancel are from the late 11th or early 12th centuries and are built in flint laid in a herringbone pattern. There are three windows from the 12th century, and the chancel arch has Norman carving. Two windows were added in the 15th century.

Careful restoration by J.L. Pearson in 1882 included reroofing and the rebuilding of the bell-turret and south porch. Two stained glass windows were added, made by Clayton and Bell, who also painted the reredos. The building was designated as Grade I listed in 1964.

The benefice was united with Manningford Abbots in 1924, together with the southern part of the benefice of Manningford Bohune, to form the parish of Manningford Bruce and Abbots. The benefice was held in plurality with Everleigh from 1967, and in 1975 became part of a team ministry which today covers a wide area in the Pewsey Vale. The former rectory, now known as Manningford Bruce House, is from the 18th century and has fragments of an earlier building.

=== Chapel ===
Providence Chapel was built by Baptists on the main road at Manningford Bohune, and carries a date of 1869. The chapel continues in use.

=== Former churches ===
There was probably a parish church at Manningford Abbots in the 10th century and certainly one in 1291; its dedication is unknown. The church was rebuilt in 1861–64 to designs by the architect S.B. Gabriel of Bristol. It was declared redundant in 1984. The rectory was a 17th-century timber-framed building, which from 1812 was encased in red brick and enlarged, with a five-bay facade; the house was sold in the 1920s after the union with Manningford Bruce.

Manningford Bohune was anciently a detached tithing of Wilsford. The Church of All Saints was built in 1859 as a chapel of ease, in 13th-century style. The chapelry was severed from Wilsford in 1924; its southern part was united with Manningford Bruce, and its northern part (including the church) was united with Woodborough to form the parish and benefice of Woodborough with Manningford Bohune. The church was declared redundant in 1973 and is in residential use.

== Local government ==
The civil parish elects a parish council. It is in the area of Wiltshire Council unitary authority, which is responsible for all significant local government functions.

Until 1934 there were three parishes: Manningford Abbots, Bruce and Bohune.

== Railway ==
The Berks and Hants Extension Railway from Hungerford to Pewsey and Devizes was built across the north of the parish and opened in 1862. Manningford Halt was opened in 1932, near the bridge carrying the road to Wilcot; it closed in 1966 when local services on the line were withdrawn.

== Notable people ==
- Dr Robin Baker, author and broadcaster, lived in Manningford Bruce 1944–1962
- J. Meade Falkner (1858–1932), novelist, poet and businessman, born in Manningford Bruce
- Jonathan Green, writer, owned a property in Manningford Bruce from 2010 to 2013
- Brigadier Robert Hall (1939–2016), first chairman of Wiltshire Council

== In popular culture ==
- Caballito, a 2012 novel by Robin Baker, is partly set in Manningford Bruce and contains descriptions of Firth Copse.
