= Huish, Wiltshire =

Village in Wiltshire, England

Coordinates: 51.370°N 1.793°W

Huish
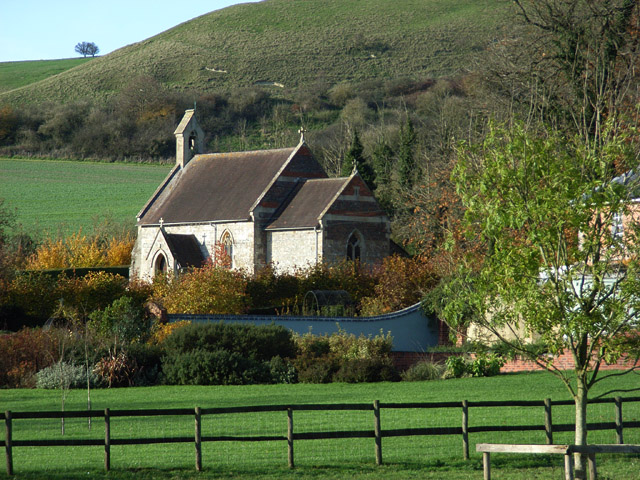
- St. Nicholas's Church, Huish

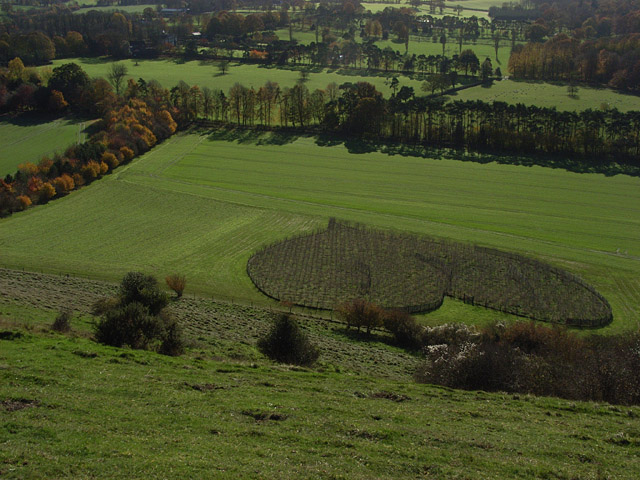
- The heart-shaped copse

- Location within Wiltshire
- Population: 43 (in 2011)
- OS grid reference: SU145635
- Civil parish: Wilcot, Huish and Oare
- Unitary authority: Wiltshire
- Ceremonial county: Wiltshire
- Region: South West
- Country: England
- Sovereign state: United Kingdom
- Post town: Marlborough
- Postcode district: SN8
- Dialling code: 01672
- Police: Wiltshire
- Fire: Dorset and Wiltshire
- Ambulance: South Western
- UK Parliament: East Wiltshire
- Website: Parish Council

Huish is a small village and former civil parish, now in the parish of Wilcot, Huish and Oare, in Wiltshire, England, 2 miles (3.2 km) northwest of Pewsey and 4 miles (6.4 km) southwest of Marlborough. In 2011 the parish had a population of 43. It is on the south-facing edge of the Marlborough Downs, where the downs adjoin the Vale of Pewsey.

== History ==
A small settlement of 11 households was recorded in the Domesday Book of 1086, when the lord of the manor was Richard Sturmy or Esturmy. The population of the parish remained low, reaching around 130 at its height between 1831 and 1881, then declining to 30 at the 1971 census.

The church and Manor Farm lie some 250 metres north of the present village, along a lane which continues (now as a track) some 1.5 km northwest to the site of the deserted village of Shaw, now in the parishes of Alton and West Overton. By the 18th century there was a hamlet on Huish Hill, straddling the boundary with Wilcot, some 900 metres north of Oare at grid reference SU157641; this hamlet began to be abandoned in the 1920s.

In 1803, land to the west of Oare village which belonged to the lords of Huish was deemed part of Huish parish. Thus the southeast boundary of Huish extends close to Oare, and Oare school (now Oare Church of England Primary School) is within Huish parish.

Cold Blow, a thatched house on the outskirts of Oare, was built in 1921–22 to designs of Clough Williams-Ellis.

A heart-shaped tree plantation was created in 1999, below Huish Hill in the southeast of the parish, near Oare. This is a geoglyph, but not a hill figure like the many surrounding "white horses" such as the Marlborough White Horse.

== Local government ==
The first tier of local government is the parish of Wilcot, Huish and Oare, which elects a parish council. Huish was anciently a parish in its own right, until 1 April 2021 when it was merged with the larger neighbouring parish of Wilcot to form "Wilcot, Huish and Oare". At the time of the merger Huish had 37 electors, and for a number of years had elected a joint parish council with Wilcot.

Huish falls within the area of the Wiltshire Council unitary authority, which is responsible for all significant local government functions.

== Parish church ==
A church was recorded at Huish in 1291. The Church of England parish church of Saint Nicholas was rebuilt in 1785, near the foundations of the 13th-century church but in a smaller size; it was again rebuilt in 1878–9.

In 1924 the benefices of Huish and Oare were united, with the parsonage house to be at Huish. Wilcot was added in 1962. In 1972 the parishes of Huish and Oare were united, and at the same time the benefice was extended by adding Woodborough with Manningford Bohune and Beechingstoke. Today the parish of Huish and Oare is part of the Vale of Pewsey team of churches.

The former rectory, a three-bay house in brick of c. 1812, is now a private house.
