= Marden, Wiltshire =

Village in Wiltshire, England

Coordinates: 51.319°N 1.879°W

Marden
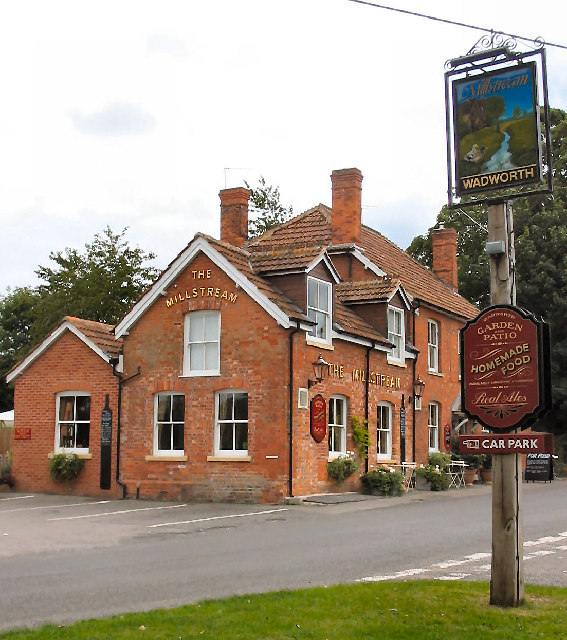
- The Millstream, Marden

- Location within Wiltshire
- Population: 112 (in 2011)
- OS grid reference: SU085578
- Civil parish: Marden
- Unitary authority: Wiltshire
- Ceremonial county: Wiltshire
- Region: South West
- Country: England
- Sovereign state: United Kingdom
- Post town: Devizes
- Postcode district: SN10
- Dialling code: 01380
- Police: Wiltshire
- Fire: Dorset and Wiltshire
- Ambulance: South Western
- UK Parliament: East Wiltshire
- Website: www.mardenwilts.org

Marden is a small village and civil parish 6 miles (9.7 km) southeast of Devizes in the county of Wiltshire, south west England. The parish is in the Vale of Pewsey which carries the upper section of the Salisbury Avon; to the south the parish extends into Salisbury Plain.

== History ==
A settlement of 29 households and one mill was recorded at Meresdene in Domesday Book of 1086. The Victoria County History traces ownership of the mill – on the Avon in the north of the parish – from the 15th century until 1970, when it was still grinding corn, albeit by electrical power; the property was sold for residential use in 1975. The three-storey mill of 1842 and adjoining two-storey house, both in red brick, were recorded as Grade II listed in 1988.

Holders of Marden manor included Gilbert Basset and his brothers Fulk (bishop of London) and Philip, all in the 13th century; and Hugh le Despenser the elder from 1298 to 1326. After Despenser's execution, the manor was granted to Queen Isabella and then Queen Philippa. Later holders included the earls of Abingdon in the 17th and 18th centuries. The present manor house, in Flemish bond brickwork, is from the early 19th century.

John Marius Wilson's Imperial Gazetteer of England and Wales (1870–1872) described Marden as follows:

MARDEN, or MERTON, a village and a parish in Devizes district, Wilts. The village stands on the river Avon, 2 miles SW of Woodborough r. station, and 6 ESE of Devizes; and has a post office, of the name of Marden, under Devizes. The parish comprises 1,278 acres. Real property, £2,291. Pop., 235. Houses, 49. The manor belongs to S. R. Neate, Esq. Two remarkable tumuli formerly were in the neighbourhood, 240 feet in circuit, and 40 feet high; and are supposed, by some writers, to mark the scene of Ethelred's defeat by the Danes in 871; but whether they were sepulchral barrows or the earthwork of an ancient British temple, is an open question. The living is a vicarage in the diocese of Salisbury. Value, £170. Patrons, the Dean and Chapter of Bristol. The church is ancient; has two Norman arches and an embattled tower; and is finely ornate, both without and within. There is a national School.

The population of the parish peaked in the second half of the 19th century, with 247 recorded at the 1871 census, then fell to 152 by 1901. A small National School was built c. 1844; the school was closed in 1925 and its premises were converted for residential use.

Marden has been suggested as a possible location for the Battle of Marton (871).

== Parish church ==
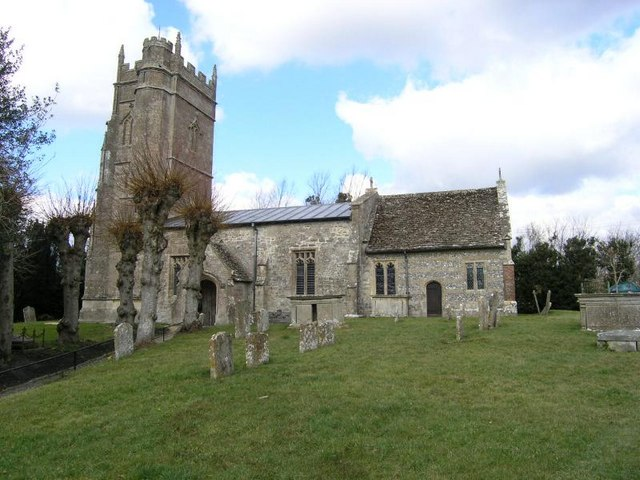
All Saints' Church

The parish church of All Saints stands on a small rise in the northwest of the village. The body of the church dates from the 12th century, and the south doorway and chancel arch survive from that period.

In the 15th century the nave was largely rebuilt, and the chancel and tower added. Restoration in 1885 by C.E. Ponting saw the rebuilding of the chancel. Pevsner states "Nave and chancel externally all Ponting's". Other work in the 19th century included the replacement of the south porch, re-roofing of the chancel, and rebuilding of the top section of the tower. Today the tower is in limestone ashlar, with a stair-tower to the southeast; the nave is sarsen and greensand rubble with limestone quoins and dressings, on sarsen foundations; and the chancel is flint with limestone banding.

The plain octagonal font is from the 13th or 14th century, and the pulpit, also octagonal, is from the 17th. In the tower are six bells: one dated 1627 and three from the 18th century. The church was recorded as Grade I listed in 1962.

The first written mention of the church is in 1205. Later in that century the church belonged to Bradenstoke Priory. The benefice was united with Chirton in 1923, and the vicar was to reside at the parsonage house in Chirton. From 1951, the vicar also held the benefice of Patney, which was added to the united benefice in 1963. The three benefices were separated in 1976.

Today the church is served by the Cannings and Redhorn Team Ministry, which covers a group of eight churches in the Vale of Pewsey. Parish registers survive from 1684 and are kept in the Wiltshire and Swindon History Centre.

== Local government ==
The civil parish elects a parish council. Local government services are provided by Wiltshire Council, which has its headquarters in Trowbridge, and the parish is represented there by Paul Oatway.

== Archaeological site ==
Marden Henge, close to the village on the other bank of the Avon, is a large Neolithic site.
