= Vale of Pewsey =

Vale in Wiltshire, England

Coordinates: 51.352°N 1.851°W

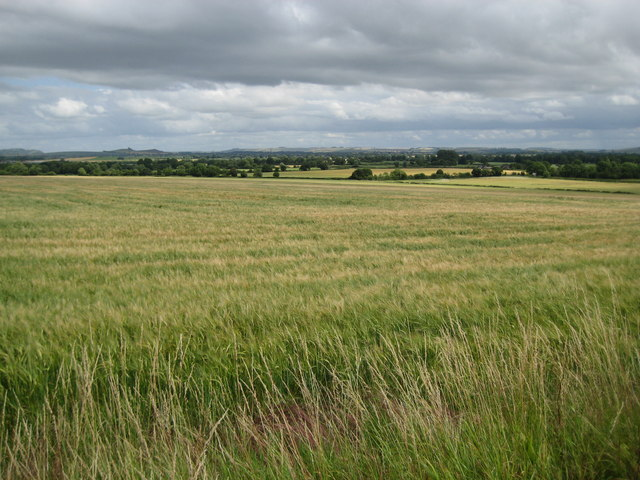
The Vale of Pewsey as viewed from the east end of Etchilhampton Hill.

The Vale of Pewsey or Pewsey Vale is an area of Wiltshire, England to the east of Devizes and south of Marlborough, centred on the village of Pewsey.

== Geography ==
The vale is an extent of lower lying ground separating the chalk downs of Salisbury Plain to the south from the Marlborough Downs to the north. It is around 30 kilometres (19 mi) long and around 5 kilometres (3.1 mi) wide. At the western end is the town of Devizes. Larger settlements in the vale include Pewsey and Burbage with many smaller villages, the larger ones including Bishops Cannings, Etchilhampton, Urchfont, Chirton, Alton Priors, Woodborough, Milton Lilbourne, Easton Royal and Wootton Rivers.

Although not itself part of the downs, the vale is included as part of the North Wessex Downs AONB (Area of Outstanding Natural Beauty).

The vale is a major east–west feature opening to the west towards the Bristol Channel, but is drained by the headwaters of the Salisbury Avon, rather than the westward-flowing Bristol Avon. The river cuts through the chalk scarp to the south at Upavon and crosses Salisbury Plain towards the south coast. The higher part of the eastern vale south of Burbage is drained by the River Bourne, which cuts the scarp at Collingbourne Kingston, joining the Avon at Salisbury. Since the area is not believed to have been glaciated, this probably indicates that the course of the rivers pre-dates the modern topography.

The highest point is Milk Hill (near Alton Barnes) at 295 m / 968 ft above sea level, with the adjacent Tan Hill summiting at 294 m / 965 ft.

The vale is not used by any major roads, but is followed by a railway and canal as a route between the London Basin and the west. To the north of Burbage the head of the Avon valley, draining west into the vale, meets the head of the River Dun, draining east to the Kennet and the Thames. The valley floor at around 150 metres (490 ft) above sea level provides a route through the downs which locally reach 200 to 300 metres. The Kennet and Avon Canal and the main line railway from London to the south-west make use of this route, the canal using the Bruce Tunnel. Formerly another rail route between Andover and Marlborough also followed this gap. Another line formerly branched off towards Bath via Devizes at the western end of the vale.

== Geology ==
The vale lies along the eroded core of an anticline, a westward extension of the Mendip Axis, with a relatively thin covering of Mesozoic sediments folded upwards over an up-faulted horst of Palaeozoic rocks. The floor of the vale is composed of Albian (Lower Cretaceous) beds of the Upper Greensand, exposed by removal of the overlying chalk. It is surrounded to the north and south by chalk scarps which close to the east near Burbage. There is also a small inlier of Greensand to the east at Shalbourne; this area drains northwards to the Kennet.

== Archaeology ==
Neolithic sites in the vale include Knap Hill, a causewayed enclosure near Alton Priors, first investigated by Benjamin and Maud Cunnington in 1908–9.

In 2000, near the village of Wilcot, a schoolboy found a hoard of Roman coins which became known as the Stanchester Hoard. The find is now at the Wiltshire Museum in Devizes. Since that time there have been several other Roman hoards discovered in the area.

In 2005, significant Neolithic finds and two henge sites – the Marden and Wilsford Henges – were discovered in the vale.

== Extent ==
According to the Pewsey Vale Local Plan prepared by Kennet District Council in 1992, the vale includes land in the following parishes: Alton, Buttermere, Burbage, Charlton, Chute, Chute Forest, Collingbourne Ducis, Collingbourne Kingston, Easton, Enford, Everleigh, Fittleton, Froxfield, Grafton, Great Bedwyn, Ham, Huish, Little Bedwyn, Manningford, Milton Lilbourne, Netheravon, North Newnton, Pewsey, Rushall, Shalbourne, Tidcombe and Fosbury, Upavon, Wilcot, Wilsford, Woodborough, and Wootton Rivers.

== Notable residents, past and present ==
- Michael Ancram MP, 13th Marquess of Lothian
- Sir Henry Howarth Bashford, physician and writer
- David Brudenell-Bruce, Earl of Cardigan, 31st hereditary warden of Savernake Forest
- Lord Devlin, judge
- Pete Doherty, musician
- Major-General Christopher Leslie Elliot
- Elinor Goodman, former Channel 4 political editor
- Brigadier Robert Hall, first chairman of Wiltshire Council
- Nick Harper, musician
- Sir Henry Keswick, chairman of Jardine Matheson Holdings
- Peter Lewis, HTV West newsreader
- Peter Mandelson, former Labour Party politician, lobbyist and diplomat
- David Newbigging, High Sheriff of Wiltshire, 2003
- Claire Perry, former member of Parliament for Devizes
- Shelley Rudman, winner of the silver medal in the skeleton bob, Britain's only medal at the 2006 Winter Olympics in Turin
- Peter Sarstedt, musician
- Andy Scott, musician of the glam-rock band The Sweet
- Jane Seymour, Queen consort of England
- Nigel Stock, actor
- Zoë Wanamaker, actress

== Culture and sport ==
Pewsey is the centre of activity for many of the smaller villages in and around the Vale of Pewsey and, as such, offers a wide range of activities for its small size.

== Places of interest ==
Avebury (stone circle), West Kennet Long Barrow, Savernake Forest, Crofton Pumping Station, Silbury Hill, Wilton Windmill, Alton Barnes (crop circles), Marlborough, Kennet and Avon Canal, Bruce Tunnel.
