= Little Cheverell =

Village in Wiltshire, England

Coordinates: 51.281°N 02.015°W

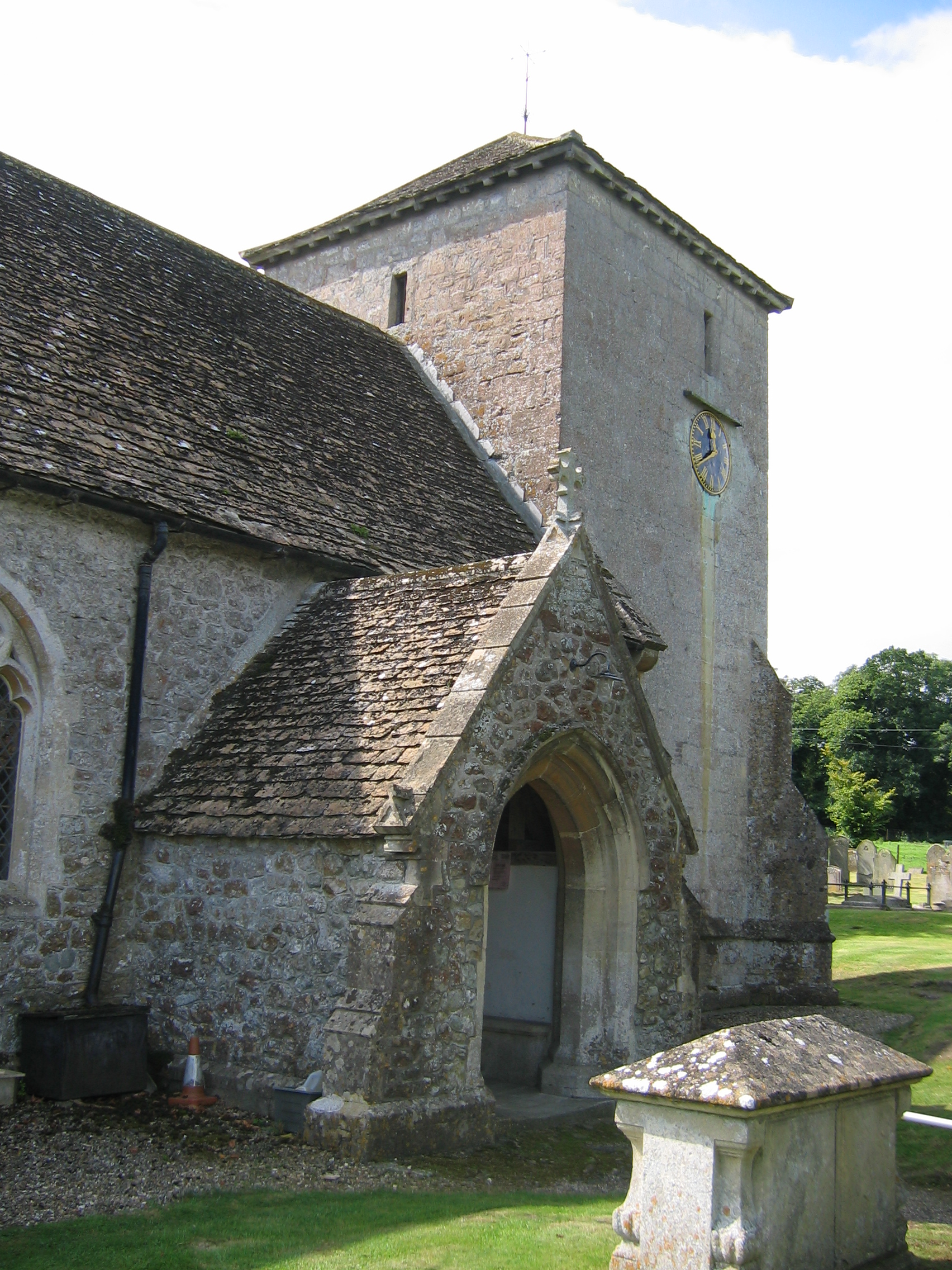
- Parish church of Saint Peter

- Location within Wiltshire
- Population: 144 (in 2011)
- OS grid reference: ST991535
- Civil parish: Little Cheverell
- Unitary authority: Wiltshire
- Ceremonial county: Wiltshire
- Region: South West
- Country: England
- Sovereign state: United Kingdom
- Post town: Devizes
- Postcode district: SN10
- Dialling code: 01380
- Police: Wiltshire
- Fire: Dorset and Wiltshire
- Ambulance: South Western
- UK Parliament: Melksham and Devizes
- Website: Parish Council

Little Cheverell is a small village and civil parish in Wiltshire, England. In some sources the Latinized name of Cheverell Parva is used, especially when referring to the parish. The village lies on the B3098 Westbury–West Lavington road, which skirts the northern edge of Salisbury Plain, and is about 7 1/2 miles (12 km) east of Westbury and 5 miles (8 km) south of Devizes. In 2011 the parish had a population of 144.

Like its neighbour to the west, Great Cheverell, the parish is narrow from east to west, but extends south onto higher ground where its southernmost part has been within the Imber Range military training area since 1943.

The civil parish elects a parish council. It is in the area of Wiltshire Council unitary authority, which is responsible for all significant local government functions.

== History ==
A large settlement of 111 households was recorded at Chevrel in the Domesday Book of 1086.

The population of the parish peaked in the 19th century, with 295 recorded at the 1841 census; numbers in the 20th century were in the range 150 to 200.

The Stert and Westbury Railway was built across the parish by the Great Western Railway Company in 1900, providing routes from London to Weymouth or Taunton. There was a station called Lavington, just beyond the east boundary of the parish, by the bridge over the A360. The line remains open but the station was closed in 1967 and no local stations remain; the nearest are Pewsey and Westbury.

Hawkswell House, south of the church, was built in brick in 1914–1920 for Robert Awdry, to designs of Arthur Campbell Martin (who also designed additions to Dauntsey's School, West Lavington). Awdry, a cricketer and county councillor who was chairman of Wiltshire County Council from 1946 to 1949, lived here until the house was commandeered by the War Office in 1941.

== Parish church ==
There was a church at Little Cheverell by 1291. The parish church was earlier called St Nicholas's but has been dedicated to St Peter since at least 1850. The squat west tower is from the 13th century, while the rest of the 14th-century church was rebuilt (and increased in length) in 1850 to designs of T. Cundy.

From 1915 onwards, the benefice of Cheverell Parva was united at various times with Great Cheverell (Cheverell Magna) and/or West Lavington. Today the parish is part of the Benefice of the Lavingtons, Cheverells & Easterton.
