= Wilsford, Wiltshire =

Village in Wiltshire, England

Coordinates: 51.314°N 1.858°W

Wilsford
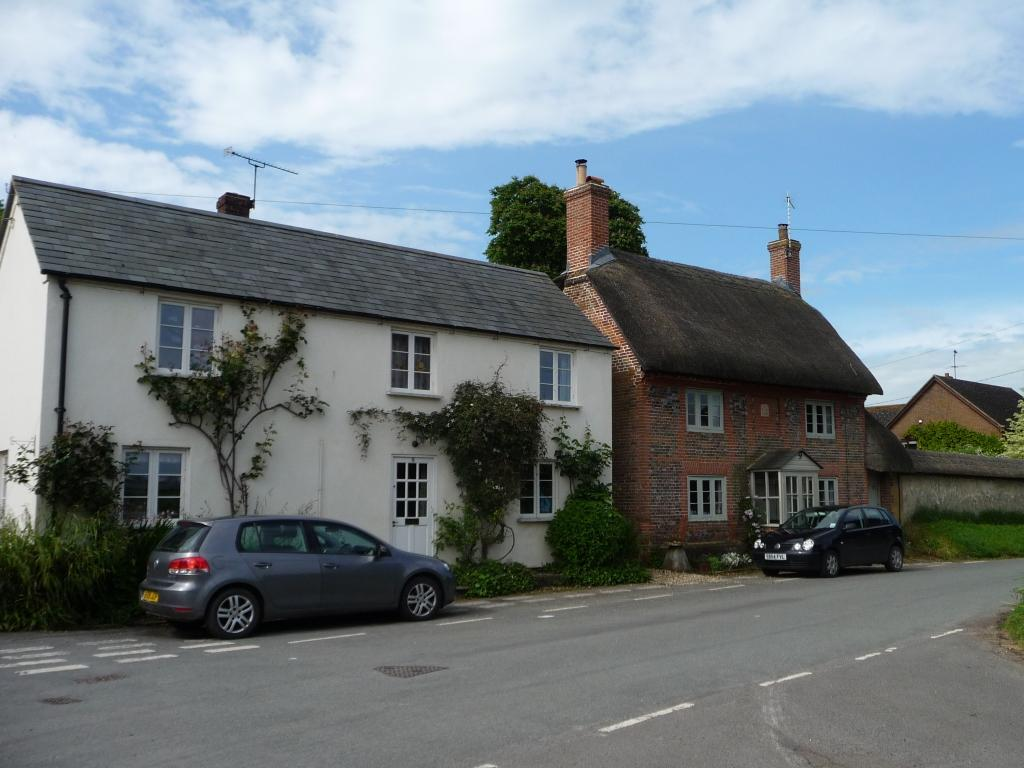
- Houses, Wilsford

- Location within Wiltshire
- Population: 77 (Parish, 2021)
- OS grid reference: SU100572
- Civil parish: Wilsford
- Unitary authority: Wiltshire
- Ceremonial county: Wiltshire
- Region: South West
- Country: England
- Sovereign state: United Kingdom
- Post town: Pewsey
- Postcode district: SN9
- Dialling code: 01672
- Police: Wiltshire
- Fire: Dorset and Wiltshire
- Ambulance: South Western
- UK Parliament: East Wiltshire
- Website: Parish Council

Wilsford is a small village and civil parish in the Vale of Pewsey in the English county of Wiltshire, about 4 miles (6 km) southwest of Pewsey. At the 2021 census the parish had a population of 77. It shares a grouped parish council with the neighbouring parish of Charlton St Peter.

The Salisbury Avon forms part of the northern boundary of the parish. To the south, beyond the A342 from Devizes to Upavon, the parish extends onto Salisbury Plain.

== History ==
Evidence of prehistoric activity on the high ground of Wilsford Down includes a round barrow, next to the ancient Ridgeway track which marks the southern boundary of the modern parish. Nearby is a series of banks and ditches of uncertain date. To the west of the village is evidence of a henge enclosure known as Wilsford Henge, although it can only be seen as a cropmark in aerial photographs. Excavations of the site began in 2015.

The ancient parish had two tithings: Wilsford and Manningford Bohune, a detached area some 2 1/2 miles (4 km) to the east. The latter became a separate civil parish in 1871 and is now part of Manningford parish.

In 1377, Wilsford had 77 taxpayers and Manningford Bohune 43. The population peaked in the mid 19th century, with around 300 at Wilsford and 280 at Manningford. Numbers at Wilsford halved by the end of that century, and continued to fall; 1971, when Wilsford had a population of 100, the Wiltshire Victoria County History described it as "remote and undeveloped".

Wilsford village developed near the river, along an east–west road which linked nearby villages. The Devizes to Upavon road – turnpiked in the 1760s and now the A342 – takes a more southerly route, towards the slope of the Plain. In 1897 the War Department bought the land south of the road for inclusion in the military training area. Today the lower parts are leased to farmers while the higher ground is within the Salisbury Plain Training Area.

A school was built in 1848. At the same time, the 1791 east window of St Stephen's church at Beechingstoke was replaced with new stained glass and the removed window was incorporated into the school. Children of all ages attended until 1934. The building was demolished after the school closed in 1965, and today the nearest primary school is at Rushall.

The whole of the village was designated as a Conservation Area in 1975.

=== Manors ===
Domesday Book has no separate entry for Wilsford; in 1086 the estate was held by Ælfric of Melksham and mortgaged to Edward of Salisbury. Edward gave it to his daughter Maud and her husband Humphrey de Bohun, and it remained in that family who were later Earls of Hereford. In 1421 the estate passed to Anne, Countess of Stafford whose son Humphrey was made Duke of Buckingham. On the execution of his great-grandson Edward, 3rd Duke the land passed to the Crown. It was granted to Sir William Sandys, later Baron Sandys, and remained in Sandys ownership until 1654. Later owners included Sir John Hynde Cotton (d.1752) and Sir John Dugdale Astley (d.1841) whose great-grandson Sir John (d.1894) sold the estate. The manor house was at the east end of the village, near the church and mill; the present Wilsford Manor is a three-bay brick house from the early 19th century.

In the 13th century, the Earls of Hereford subinfeudated part of their estate, which came into the Dauntsey family whose descendants include Sir John Dauntsey (d.1391), soldier and Member of Parliament for Wiltshire. Samuel Lewis's Topographical Dictionary of England of 1858 used the name Wilsford-Dauntsey for the parish. From the 17th century the estate passed through several hands, and by 1808 had been acquired by Francis Dugdale Astley and thus reunited with the main manor. The manor house was at the west end of the village, where the present Wilsford House – four bays, in brick – is from the late 18th century or early 19th.

== Governance ==
There are two tiers of local government covering Charlton St Peter, at parish and unitary authority level: Charlton St Peter and Wilsford Joint Parish Council, and Wiltshire Council. The parish council is a grouped parish council, also covering the neighbouring parish of Charlton St Peter.

== Notable buildings ==
Beside the church, the oldest houses in the village include the following timber-framed cottages, with thatched roofs. Cruck End has an exposed cruck truss and is classed as "late Medieval" by Historic England. The Malt House has been tree-ring-dated in part to 1410. Number 18 has at its core an early hall house, tree-ring-dated to 1308–9.

== Parish church ==
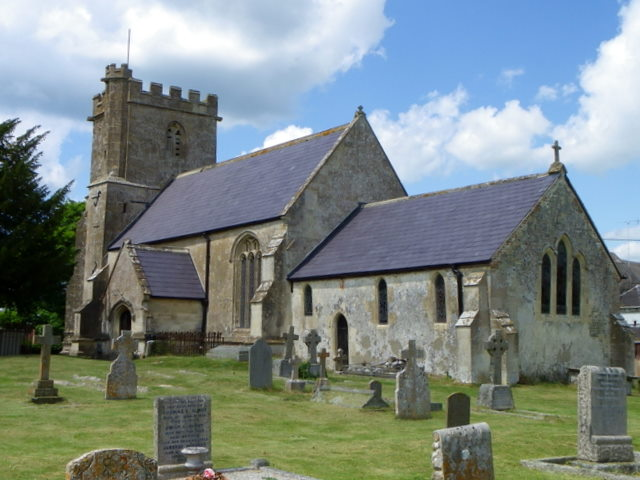
St Nicholas' Church

The parish church of St Nicholas is built in ashlar under slate roofs, and has a west tower with a stair-turret. A church at Wilsford is first mentioned in the earlier 12th century, although the present building is from the next century.

The 13th-century chancel has a low 15th-century roof and is described by Historic England as a "splendid example of a modest medieval chancel that rarely escaped C19 restoration". In the 15th century the tower was added and the nave largely rebuilt. During restoration in 1864 the south porch was rebuilt and the nave re-roofed, resting on earlier corbels depicting alternating kings and bishops. A north chapel was removed in 1959 and there was further restoration in 1960. A blocked doorway in the north wall of the chapel contains reset stones from a small 12th or 13th-century doorway.

Five bells were cast by Rudhall of Gloucester in 1718. The tenor fell in the early 20th century and the remaining four were repaired and rehung in 1959. Monuments in the churchyard include three 18th-century chest tombs. The church was designated as Grade II* listed in 1964.

All Saints' Church, Manningford Bohune was built as a chapel of ease in 1859. The chapel was separated from Wilsford in 1924, and at the same time Wilsford benefice was united with that of Charlton, although the parishes of Wilsford and Charlton remained distinct. North Newnton was added to the union in 1963, and today the parish is part of the Cannings and Redhorn team ministry, alongside seven others.
