= Charlton St Peter =

Village in Wiltshire, England

Coordinates: 51.303°N 1.833°W

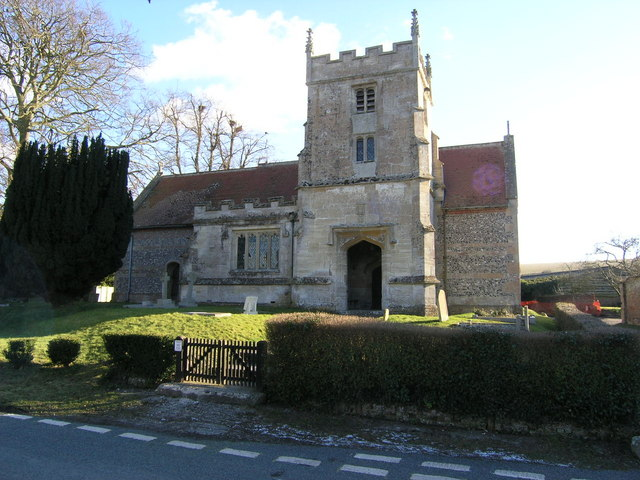
- St Peter's Church

- Location within Wiltshire
- Population: 79 (Parish, 2021)
- OS grid reference: SU117560
- Civil parish: Charlton St Peter
- Unitary authority: Wiltshire
- Ceremonial county: Wiltshire
- Region: South West
- Country: England
- Sovereign state: United Kingdom
- Post town: Pewsey
- Postcode district: SN9
- Dialling code: 01980
- Police: Wiltshire
- Fire: Dorset and Wiltshire
- Ambulance: South Western
- UK Parliament: East Wiltshire
- Website: Parish Council

Charlton St Peter or just Charlton is a small village and civil parish in the Vale of Pewsey in the English county of Wiltshire. The village lies about 4 miles (6 km) south-west of Pewsey. At the 2021 census the parish had a population of 79. It shares a grouped parish council with the neighbouring parish of Wilsford.

The village is in the north of the parish, between the River Avon and the Devizes-Upavon road, the A342. To the south the parish extends onto Salisbury Plain.

The name Charlton derives from the Old English ceorltūn meaning 'churl's settlement'.

== Parish church ==
The Church of England parish church of St Peter was largely rebuilt by J.L. Pearson in 1858. Fragments of a 12-century building survive, and the tower is from the 15th or 16th centuries. The north chantry chapel, c. 1523, is in memory of William and Marion Chaucey. In 1964 the church was designated as Grade II* listed.

The first record of a vicar at Charlton is from 1306, and by that time the church had been appropriated by the nearby Upavon Priory; in 1423 Upavon and Charlton were granted to the Augustinian canons of Ivychurch Priory, south-east of Salisbury, who held them until the Dissolution. Today the parish is served by the Vale of Pewsey team ministry.

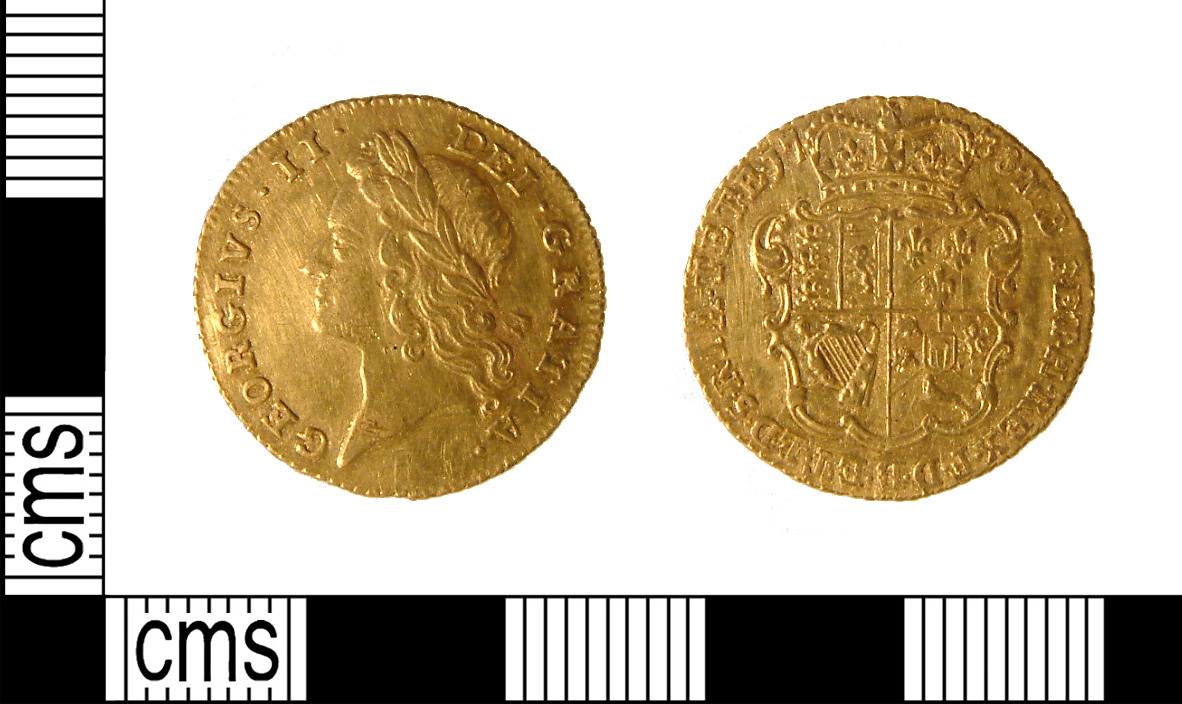
A gold half-guinea coin of George II, minted in 1738 and found in Charlton in 2009

== Governance ==
There are two tiers of local government covering Charlton St Peter, at parish and unitary authority level: Charlton St Peter and Wilsford Joint Parish Council, and Wiltshire Council. The parish council is a grouped parish council, also covering the neighbouring parish of Wilsford.

On 1 July 2022 the parish was renamed from "Charlton" to "Charlton St Peter".

== Traditions ==
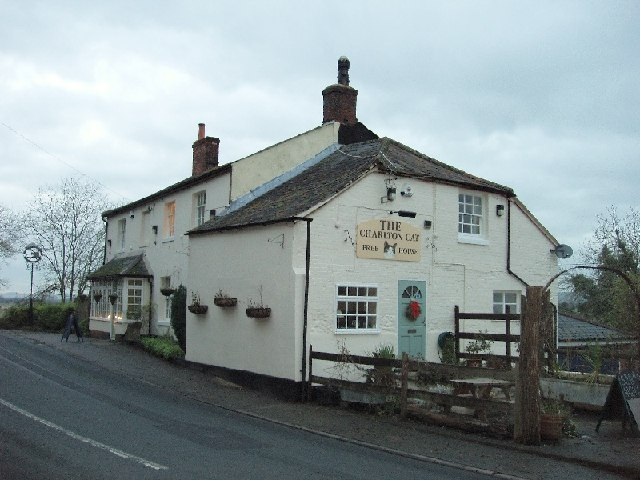
The Charlton Cat in 2005. This building dates from about 1821, a replacement for an eighteenth-century alehouse.

The village inn is the Charlton Cat, "a solitary little inn at the foot of the downs". This establishment was originally called the Red Lion, later the Poores Arms after Edward Poore, lord of the nearby manor of Rushall in the eighteenth century, but the villagers had long known it as The Cat, from the ill-painted lion of the original sign. This name was formally adopted in 1921.

Charlton and the neighbouring village of Rushall hold an annual village cricket match each year in June. It used to be played in each village alternately, but in recent years since the Village Lunch has been established in Rushall Village Hall, the match has been played in a field behind the Old Barns. In the last few years a tug-of-war competition has been started, only seriously between the men for the trophy, but there are a women's and children's tug-of-war as well.

== Notable people ==
Stephen Duck, 18th-century poet, was born here and the grave of his wife Mary is in the churchyard. The "Duck Feast", held annually at the Charlton Cat in the first week of June, commemorates his life and work. The cost is met from the rent of "Duck's Acre", a field in Rushall donated for the purpose by Lord Palmerston.
