= Woodborough, Wiltshire =

Village in Wiltshire, England

Coordinates: 51.338°N 1.847°W

Woodborough
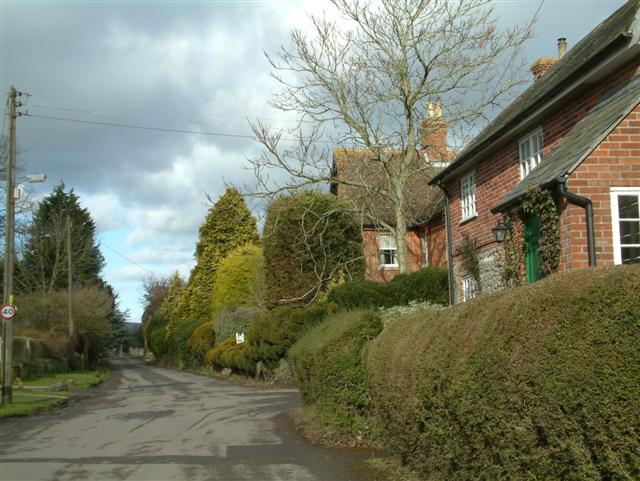

- Location within Wiltshire
- Population: 292 (in 2011)
- OS grid reference: SU108599
- Civil parish: Woodborough
- Unitary authority: Wiltshire
- Ceremonial county: Wiltshire
- Region: South West
- Country: England
- Sovereign state: United Kingdom
- Post town: Pewsey
- Postcode district: SN9
- Dialling code: 01672
- Police: Wiltshire
- Fire: Dorset and Wiltshire
- Ambulance: South Western
- UK Parliament: East Wiltshire

Woodborough is a small village and civil parish in the Vale of Pewsey, Wiltshire, England, about 3.5 miles (5.6 km) west of Pewsey.

== History ==
The Domesday survey in 1086 recorded 22 households and a mill at Witeberge, in Swanborough Hundred. The Wiltshire Victoria County History has an account of later landowners. From 1917, three farms accounted for most of the land in the parish: Church farm, Honey Street farm and Hurst's farm.

At some point, the Honeystreet area – including the canalside hamlet and the farm – was transferred from Woodborough civil parish to Alton. The Manor House (brick with a thatched roof) and Church Farmhouse (vitrified brick and red brick, slate roof) are both from the early 18th century.

== Local government ==
The civil parish elects a parish council. It is in the area of Wiltshire Council, a unitary authority which is responsible for all significant local government functions.

== Church and chapel ==
The Church of England parish church of St Mary Magdalene is on the northern edge of the village and is built in squared limestone. The present building is entirely from the 19th century but there is evidence of a 12th-century church on the site, and records of the church occur from the mid-13th century. In 1850, the chancel was rebuilt in 13th-century style by William Butterfield, and in 1861–2 T.H. Wyatt rebuilt the nave, with a south porch, lean-to vestry, and above the west gable a bell-cot for the single bell.

All Saints' Church, Manningford Bohune was transferred from Wilsford in 1924 to create the parish and benefice of Woodborough with Manningford Bohune. Honeystreet hamlet was transferred to the parish of Alton Barnes with Alton Priors in 1928. From 1951, the united benefice was held in plurality with Beechingstoke, and in 1961 Beechingstoke was added to the union. In 1972, a team ministry was established for the wider area, and today the church is part of the Vale of Pewsey group, alongside 15 others.

A Wesleyan Methodist chapel opened in 1822 and closed in 1970.

== Transport ==
The Kennet and Avon Canal, opened in 1810, crosses the parish. A wharf at Honeystreet, a short distance to the north of the parish, handled cargo for the area. The Reading to Taunton railway line, built in 1862, became the southern boundary of the parish; Woodborough station, which was south of the village off Broad Street, closed in 1966 making Pewsey the nearest station. There are no main roads in the parish. Minor roads provide links to Alton Barnes to the north, Pewsey to the west, and to the south through other villages to the A342 Devizes–Upavon road.

== Amenities ==
Woodborough C of E Primary School serves the parish and surrounding area. The building began as a National School in 1873.

The village has a social club. The nearest pub is at Bottlesford.
