= Chirton =

Village and civil parish in Wiltshire, England

Coordinates: 51.317°N 1.896°W

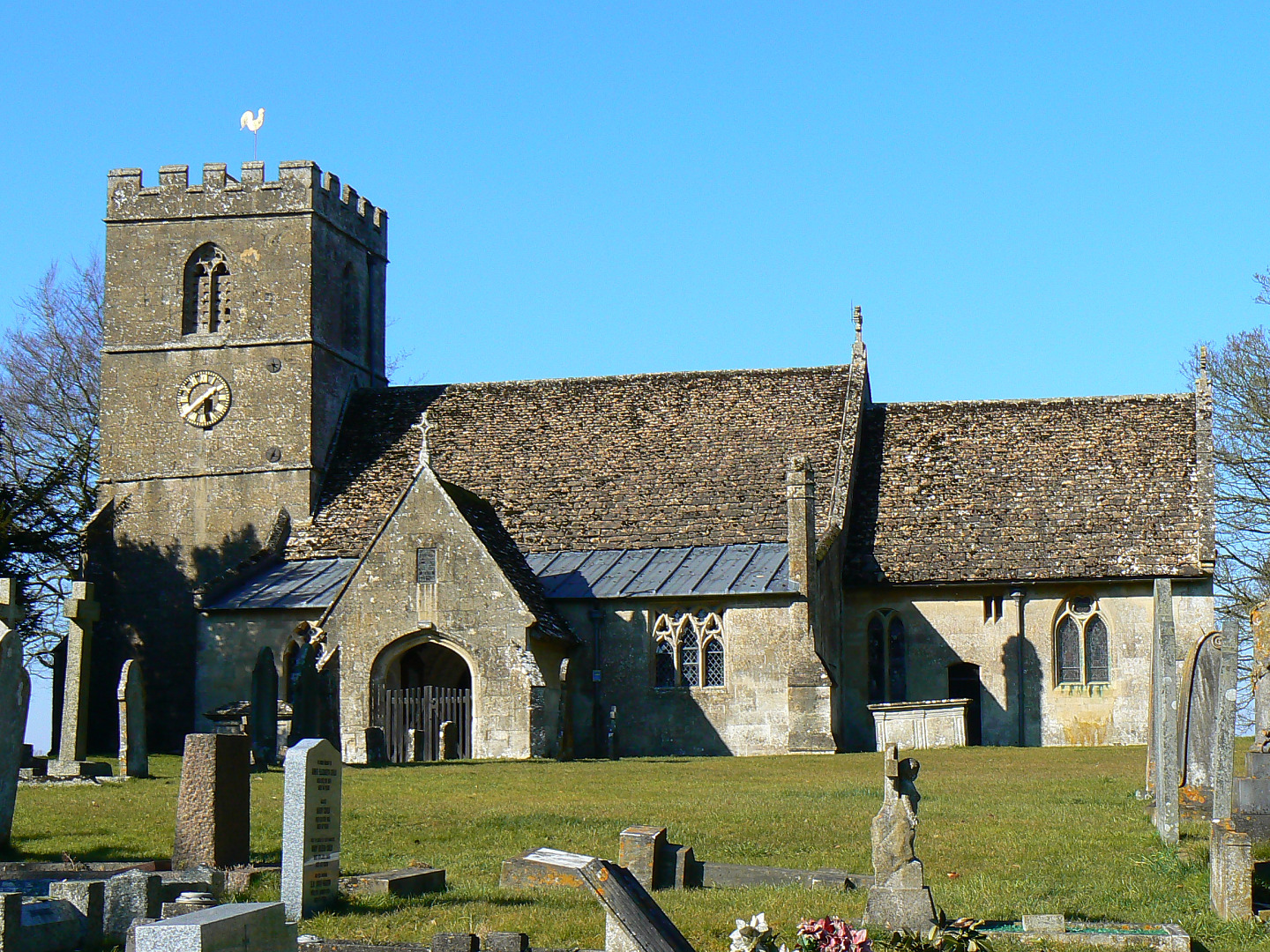
- The church of St John the Baptist, Chirton

- Location within Wiltshire
- Population: 406 (in 2011)
- OS grid reference: SU073575
- Civil parish: Chirton
- Unitary authority: Wiltshire
- Ceremonial county: Wiltshire
- Region: South West
- Country: England
- Sovereign state: United Kingdom
- Post town: Devizes
- Postcode district: SN10
- Dialling code: 01380
- Police: Wiltshire
- Fire: Dorset and Wiltshire
- Ambulance: South Western
- UK Parliament: East Wiltshire
- Website: Parish Council

Chirton is a village and civil parish in Wiltshire, England, on the southern edge of the Vale of Pewsey about five miles (eight kilometres) southeast of Devizes. The parish includes the hamlet of Conock, about one-half mile (800 metres) west of Chirton village. In 2011 the parish had a population of 406.

Both settlements are just north the A342 Devizes-Andover road and are reached by separate lanes from the main road. The northern boundary of the parish follows approximately the course of the River Avon, and in the south the parish extends onto Salisbury Plain.

== History ==
Chirton (17 households and one mill) and Conock (18) were recorded in the Domesday Book of 1086. Early in the 12th century an estate at Chirton was granted to the recently established Lanthony Priory, Gloucester, who retained it until the Dissolution.

The mill recorded in Domesday Book was probably that later known as Church Mill, on the Avon in the north-east corner of the parish. It belonged to Chirton manor and therefore later to Lanthony; by 1572 it was owned by John Eyre of Wedhampton, Chirton and Great Chalfied. A descendant sold it in 1671 to Ralph Brideoake, dean of Salisbury, who presumably made the purchase on behalf of the almshouses at Heytesbury, whose charity owned it until the early 20th century. Their tenants, the Chandler family, used the site for malting; there was also a corn mill in the later 19th century. The buildings fell into disuse in the early 20th century and today those that remain are dwellings.

The population of the parish peaked around the middle of the 19th century, with 467 recorded at the 1851 census, around a third of them at Conock. Numbers declined to 261 by 1901.

Some 700 acres (280 hectares) of downland in the southernmost part of the parish, south of an ancient east-west track, was purchased by the War Department in 1899–1900 and today forms part of the Salisbury Plain Training Area.

When the Stert and Westbury Railway was opened through the Vale in 1900, the nearest station was near Patney, one mile (1.5 kilometres) north of Chirton village. Known initially as 'Patney Bridge', this was soon changed to 'Patney and Chirton' to avoid confusion with Putney Bridge station in London. The station closed in 1966.

=== Conock ===
The manor recorded in Domesday Book was held by Robert, Count of Mortain (half-brother of William the Conqueror) and tenanted by Grestain Abbey, Normandy. By at least the 14th century it was administered from Wilmington Priory, the abbey's cell in East Sussex. In 1324 the land was seized by the king, along with other alien priories, and it was acquired in the 1350s by Michael de la Pole (later Lord Chancellor and Earl of Suffolk), and his brothers Edmund and Thomas. In 1442 their descendant William (later Duke of Suffolk), together with his wife Alice, gave the manor to their recently established almshouse at Ewelme, Oxfordshire (Alice's home village).

The Ewelme charity retained the Conock estate into the 20th century. Their tenants included several Ernle generations, beginning with Sir Walter Ernle, 1st Baronet (died 1682). During the 18th century, their descendants the Warriners gradually acquired leases from the Ewelme trustees, amounting to most of Conock tithing by the early 19th century. The Ewelme trustees sold the manor house in 1945 and Manor Farm in 1948 to Sir Frederick Sykes (died 1954), formerly Chief of the Air Staff, Member of Parliament and Governor of Bombay. In 1970, the charity retained Conock Old Manor, Conock Cottage (18th century) and a few estate cottages; these properties were sold in the early 21st century.

== Religious sites ==
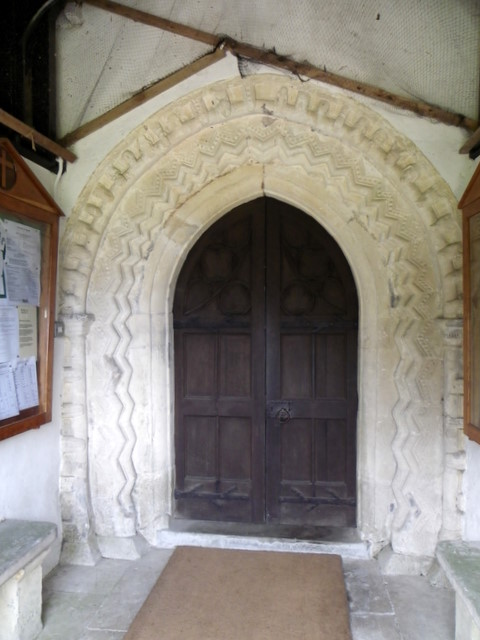
South door, St John's Church

The Church of England parish church of St John the Baptist has Norman features; in the 12th century the church was granted to the newly established Llanthony Secunda priory at Gloucester. Some masonry in the chancel is from that century, as is the stone font with its eroded high-quality carving of the twelve apostles. The south doorway of c.1175 has two orders of elaborate carving, described by Orbach as "lavish". The aisles were made wider in the 14th century, and the tower and south porch were added in the 15th century. The timbers of the nave roof are c.1200 but the chancel roof was replaced in the severe restoration carried out in 1850 by William Butterfield, which also saw changes to several windows and the addition of the vestry. The church was designated as Grade I listed in 1962.

The pulpit and pews are by Butterfield, and much of the stained glass is from the same 1850 restoration, including chancel windows by William Wailes. Four of the six bells are from the early 18th century. Monuments in the churchyard include four chest tombs for members of the Bruges family, from the 18th century and early 19th.

The benefice was united with Marden in 1923, and the vicar was to live at the parsonage house in Chirton. From 1951, the vicar also held the benefice of Patney, which was added to the united benefice in 1963. The three benefices were separated in 1976. Today the church is served by the Cannings and Redhorn Team Ministry, which covers a group of eight churches in the Vale of Pewsey.

Conock had a chapel in the 13th century, which fell into disuse after the land was seized by the king.

== Local government ==
Chirton is a civil parish with an elected parish council, styled as Chirton & Conock Parish Council. It is in the area of Wiltshire Council, a unitary authority responsible for almost all local government functions, and is represented there by Paul Oatway.

== Notable buildings ==
The vicarage house mentioned at Chirton in 1609 is probably the present-day Yew Tree Cottage, which has 17th-century timber frames and 19th-century additions. It was replaced by a three-bay brick house close to the church, built c.1800 and extended at the rear to designs of J. P. Seddon in 1878.

The former farmhouse to the east of the church began as a timber-framed house in the 15th or 16th century, and was refaced in brick in the 18th.

The house known as Conock Old Manor was built in the late 17th century, then largely rebuilt in 1753 for Gifford Warriner (died 1787). In brick with stone quoins, the L-shaped two-storey house has seven bays on the west elevation and five on the north. The MP, journalist, author and broadcaster Woodrow Wyatt leased the house for a time and was living there in 1970.

=== Conock Manor ===
Pevsner describes Conock Manor as "a Georgian house of great charm". There was probably a house here in the 15th century but the present house dates in part from c.1700. It was altered in 1789 for Gifford Warriner (died 1820) and the architect Richard Ingleman carried out improvement and enlargement for his son Ernle in 1817 (Historic England) or soon after 1820 (Orbach); this work included encasing the house in limestone ashlar and adding two single-storey wings to the two-storey house. Interior alterations were made in 1934 by a later lessee, RFC officer Robert Smith-Barry.

The west entrance front has five bays, the central one brought forward and pedimented, above a semicircular porch described as "elegant" by Orbach. The porch has fluted Ionic columns, and at each end of the facade are two-storey pilasters in the same style; these are repeated in pairs on the fronts of Ingleman's wings. On the garden side, the central door with broken curved pediment was probably the original front door of 1700. Smith-Barry installed 18th-century marble fireplaces in the hall and in Ingleman's library.

The house was designated as Grade II* listed in 1962. In 2010, the nine-bedroom house with 470 acres (190 hectares) and other dwellings were offered for sale at £7.3 million.

Access to the estate is through a gateway with four 19th-century limestone piers. As the driveway curves towards the house, decorative iron railings and pedestrian gates line the south-east side. The brick stable block is from the mid to late 18th century, and its two-storey central block has a copper-clad cupola on Tuscan columns; perhaps a later addition, although there is a bell dated 1765.

Around 1820, the surrounding area – including the Old Manor and Manor Farm – was laid out in Picturesque style, with parkland, a ha-ha and tree-planting. A 110-acre (43 ha) area, encompassing the whole of Conock hamlet, was designated Grade II on the National Register of Historic Parks and Gardens in 1987.

== Amenities ==
Chirton has a church of England primary school which serves the nearby villages. Sited near the church, the building began as a National School in the 1840s.
