= Wilcot =

Village in Wiltshire, England

Coordinates: 51.348°N 1.797°W

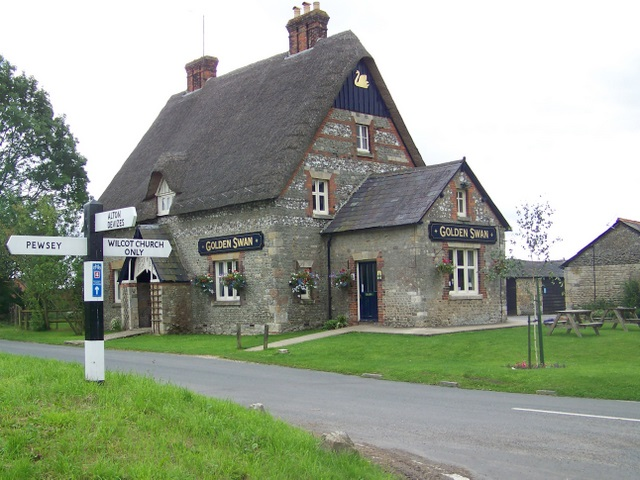
- The Golden Swan, Wilcot

- Location within Wiltshire
- Population: 558 (2011 census)
- OS grid reference: SU142610
- Civil parish: Wilcot, Huish and Oare
- Unitary authority: Wiltshire
- Ceremonial county: Wiltshire
- Region: South West
- Country: England
- Sovereign state: United Kingdom
- Post town: PEWSEY
- Postcode district: SN9
- Dialling code: 01672
- Police: Wiltshire
- Fire: Dorset and Wiltshire
- Ambulance: South Western
- UK Parliament: East Wiltshire
- Website: Parish Council

Wilcot is a village and former civil parish, now in the parish of Wilcot, Huish and Oare, in Wiltshire, England, in the Vale of Pewsey about 6 miles (10 km) southwest of Marlborough and 1.5 mi (2.4 km) northwest of Pewsey. In 2011 the parish had a population of 558.

The parish of Wilcot, Huish and Oare was created on 1 April 2021 by merging the small Huish parish with Wilcot parish, which besides Wilcot village covered the village of Oare and the hamlets of Draycot Fitz Payne, Rainscombe, West Stowell and Wilcot Green.

== History ==
Giant's Grave on Martinsell Hill above Oare is a promontory fort, probably from the Iron Age. Roman coins were found in 2000 at the site of Stanchester villa. Domesday Book in 1086 recorded a sizeable settlement of 43 households at Wilcote on land held by Edward of Salisbury; and 14 households at Draicote on land held by Geoffrey, bishop of Coutances.

The ancient parish of Wilcot consisted of three tithings: Wilcot with East Stowell, Draycot Fitz Payne, and Oare. Hare Street, now a minor road passing east of Wilcot village, was once part of the route from Upavon to Marlborough. Its name is thought to reflect its origin as a herepath (military road) in Saxon times. Another ancient route was Workway Drove, a drovers' road from Pewsey, through Wilcot and northwest to Knap Hill.

The Kennet and Avon Canal was built through the parish in the early years of the 19th century. Susannah Wroughton, owner of Wilcot Manor, persuaded John Rennie to route the canal further north to take it away from the house, and to provide an ornate limestone bridge known as Ladies Bridge (1808, today carrying a farm track) next to a wider stretch of the canal known as Wide Water.

The parish was described as follows in The National Gazetteer (1868):

WILCOT, a parish in the hundred of Swanborough, county Wilts, 6 miles S.W. of Marlborough, 10 E. of Devizes, and 1½ mile N.W. of Pewsey. The village is situated close to the Avon and Kennet canal. There are about 200 acres of open downs. The soil is generally a rich loam, and the land chiefly arable. The parish includes the tythings of Draycott-Foliat, Care, and Stowell, or Towel. At the time of the Norman survey it had a church, vineyard, and seat of Edward de Salisbury, and subsequently came to the Lovells, by whom it was held till the reign of Henry VII. There are several chalk pits. The living is a vicarage in the diocese of Salisbury, value £150. The church is dedicated to the Holy Cross. Colonel Wroughton is lord of the manor.

As noted by the Gazetteer, at the time of the Domesday Book Wilcot was one of the manors of Edward of Salisbury, who was High Sheriff of Wiltshire from 1070 to 1105 and had a "very good house" there.

Edward's son Walter founded Bradenstoke Priory, some 14 miles (23 km) northwest of Wilcot, and Walter's son Patrick gave Wilcot manor to the priory. The land was retained by the priory until the Dissolution, and in 1549 was bought by John Berwick (died 1572), who was part of the Seymour entourage and had sat as Member of Parliament for Great Bedwyn and Marlborough. In the 19th century the land passed by inheritance and marriage to the Montagu family, including Admiral George Montagu (1750–1829). The Montagus sold the farmland in the early 20th century.

There is a 17th-century legend that Wilcot vicarage was haunted by the incessant sound of a tolling bell. It is said that a wizard caused the tolling at a request of a drunkard, who wanted to revenge himself on the vicar for refusing to ring his bells late at night.

A village at East Stowell was deserted in the early 19th century, coinciding with the building of Stowell Park.

== Local government ==
The first tier of local government in the parish of Wilcot, Huish and Oare is the parish council, which has nine councillors. Prior to the merger of Wilcot and Huish parishes in 2020, there was a joint parish council called 'Wilcot and Huish (with Oare)'. The parish falls within the area of the Wiltshire Council unitary authority, which is responsible for all significant local government functions.

Rainscombe, in the northeast, was transferred from North Newnton parish in 1885.

== Parish church ==
Domesday Book recorded a church at Wilcot in 1086. The present parish church of the Holy Cross, in the south of the village, has 12th-century origins: its earliest part is the chancel arch, from about 1200 although restored, and four 12th-century stones were reset when the chancel was rebuilt in 1825. The west tower was added in the 15th century. After the church was badly damaged by fire in 1876, the nave was partly rebuilt and the chancel rebuilt and lengthened.

The church is built in rubble and ashlar, and has a monument dated 1574 to John Berwick and brasses for the 19th-century Montagus. In the churchyard are several listed monuments, including chest tombs from the 18th and 19th centuries. The building was designated as Grade II* listed in 1964.

Holy Trinity church at Oare was built as a chapel of ease in 1858, and in 1892 a separate ecclesiastical parish was created for it. In 1928, in connection with changes to Alton Barnes parish, the hamlet of West Stowell was transferred from there to Wilcot.

The benefices of Oare and Huish were later combined, and Wilcot was added to the union in 1962. In 1972 a team ministry was established for the local area, and today the church is part of the Vale of Pewsey Churches, a group of 16 churches.

== Notable buildings ==
Wilcot village developed in two parts: the early settlement in the south with the church and manor house, and houses to the north around Wilcot Green, built from the 18th century.

The manor house, close to the west end of the church, dates from the early 17th century with remodelling in the 18th. It is built in brick with tall chimney stacks, and is Grade II* listed. In the grounds to the south are a small lake and a circular stone dovecote dated 1737. Wroughtons and Montagus owned the manor until the property was sold in 1919. Later owners include Lord Ernest St. Maur (d.1922; son of the 14th Duke of Somerset) and, from 1950 to 1951, the actor David Niven. Manor Farmhouse, in red and blue brick just north of the manor house, is from the mid to late 18th century.

Admiral Sir George Montagu (1750–1829) built Stowell Lodge (now Stowell Park House) in 1813. The ashlar limestone house is five bays wide and three deep, and parkland was designed around it, extending south to the recently completed canal. Around 1845 an iron and steel suspension bridge was erected to carry a footpath from the park over the canal. The house was sold by Admiral Montagu's grandson in 1901. In 1970 it was owned by Sir Philip Dunn.

The Golden Swan public house was built at Wilcot Green in 1859, in malmstone under a thatched roof.

Rainscombe House, below Oare Hill, was built around 1816 to designs of Thomas Baldwin; its main block is five by three bays. As of 2019 the house is owned by businessman Robert Hiscox.

== Amenities ==
The village has a pub, the Golden Swan. The Kennet and Avon Canal passes close to the village.

A school was built at Wilcot Green in 1841, closed in 1969 and is now the village hall; the nearest primary school is at Oare.

The opening of the Reading–Taunton line through Pewsey Vale in 1862, with a station at Pewsey, brought a railway connection to London.
