= Rushall, Wiltshire =

Village in Wiltshire, England

Coordinates: 51.301°N 1.823°W

Rushall
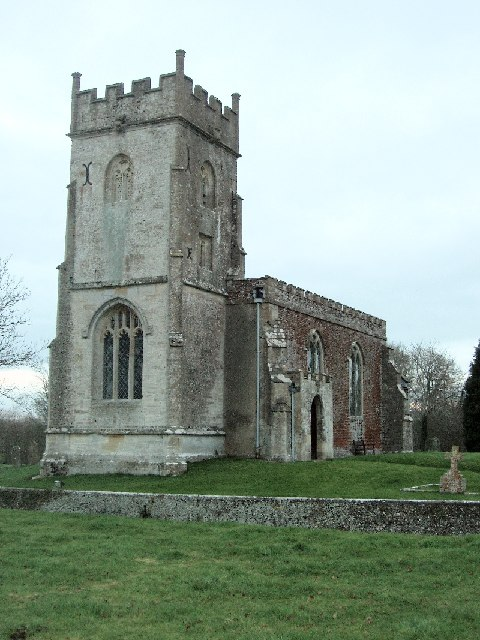
- St Matthew's church, Rushall

- Location within Wiltshire
- Population: 143 (in 2011)
- OS grid reference: SU124558
- Civil parish: Rushall
- Unitary authority: Wiltshire
- Ceremonial county: Wiltshire
- Region: South West
- Country: England
- Sovereign state: United Kingdom
- Post town: Pewsey
- Postcode district: SN9
- Dialling code: 01980
- Police: Wiltshire
- Fire: Dorset and Wiltshire
- Ambulance: South Western
- UK Parliament: East Wiltshire
- Website: Community

Rushall is a small village and civil parish in Wiltshire, England, 8 miles (13 km) southeast of Devizes and 3/4 mile (1.2 km) northwest of Upavon on the A342 between Devizes and Andover. The village is near the River Avon in the Vale of Pewsey.

The parish extends southeast onto Salisbury Plain and into the military training area.

== History ==
There is a prehistoric or medieval linear earthwork on Rushall Down, one of several archaeological remains on the Plain.

Rushall appears in Domesday Book, as a large settlement of 105 households, with a church, at Rusteselue. Before 1086 it was held by Gytha, the widow of Earl Godwin, or by Harold, her son, but by the time of the survey, it had been given to the Abbey of St. Wandrille. There seems to have been a church present at that time. In the twelfth and thirteenth centuries, the manor was held by the de Aunay family and subsequently changed hands several times. By 1404 it was in the hands of Lord Hungerford, and his family remained in possession until it was sold in 1548 or 1549. By 1749 it had been sold to Edward Poore, who set about rebuilding or replacing the manor house and emparking the surrounding land.

== Amenities ==
Rushall Church of England Voluntary Aided Primary School serves the surrounding villages, including Upavon and the British Army garrison at Trenchard Lines.

The modern village hall is shared with the neighbouring village of Charlton.

The Anglican Church of St Matthew is Grade II* listed. Parts of a 14th-century building survive; the tower dates from the late 15th or early 16th century. In 1812 much of the church was rebuilt in brick, and in 1905 restoration was carried out by C.E. Ponting. The benefice was combined with Upavon in 1924, but the parishes remained separate; today the parish is part of the Vale of Pewsey team ministry, which covers Pewsey and many rural parishes.

== Governance ==
The civil parish elects a parish council. All significant local government services are provided by Wiltshire Council, a unitary authority with its headquarters in Trowbridge, and the parish is represented there by Paul Oatway. In the House of Commons the parish is part of the East Wiltshire constituency.
