= North Newnton =

Civil parish in Wiltshire, England

Coordinates: 51.310°N 1.812°W

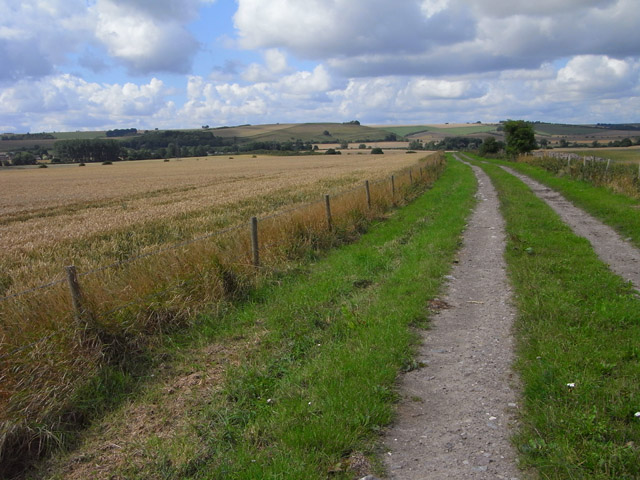
- Bridleway, North Newnton

- Location within Wiltshire
- Population: 430 (2011 census)
- OS grid reference: SU131576
- Civil parish: North Newnton
- Unitary authority: Wiltshire
- Ceremonial county: Wiltshire
- Region: South West
- Country: England
- Sovereign state: United Kingdom
- Post town: Pewsey
- Postcode district: SN9
- Dialling code: 01980
- Police: Wiltshire
- Fire: Dorset and Wiltshire
- Ambulance: South Western
- UK Parliament: East Wiltshire
- Website: Parish Council

North Newnton is a civil parish in Wiltshire, England, 2.5 miles (4.0 km) southwest of Pewsey. The parish is in the Vale of Pewsey which carries the upper section of the Salisbury Avon.

The parish includes the small village of Bottlesford and the hamlet of Hilcott.

== History ==
Domesday Book recorded 33 households, and land held by Wilton Abbey, at Newetone in 1086.

The parish was described as follows in The National Gazetteer (1868):

NORTH NEWNTON, a parish and township in the hundred of Swanborough, county of Wilts, 8 miles S.E. of Devizes, and 4 S.W. of Pewsey. The village, which is small, is situated on the river Avon. The parish contains the tythings of Hilcott and Rainscombe, with Overton Heath. The living is a vicarage in the diocese of Gloucester and Bristol, value £176. The church, dedicated to St. James, is an ancient structure, with a square tower. The Primitive Methodists have a chapel."

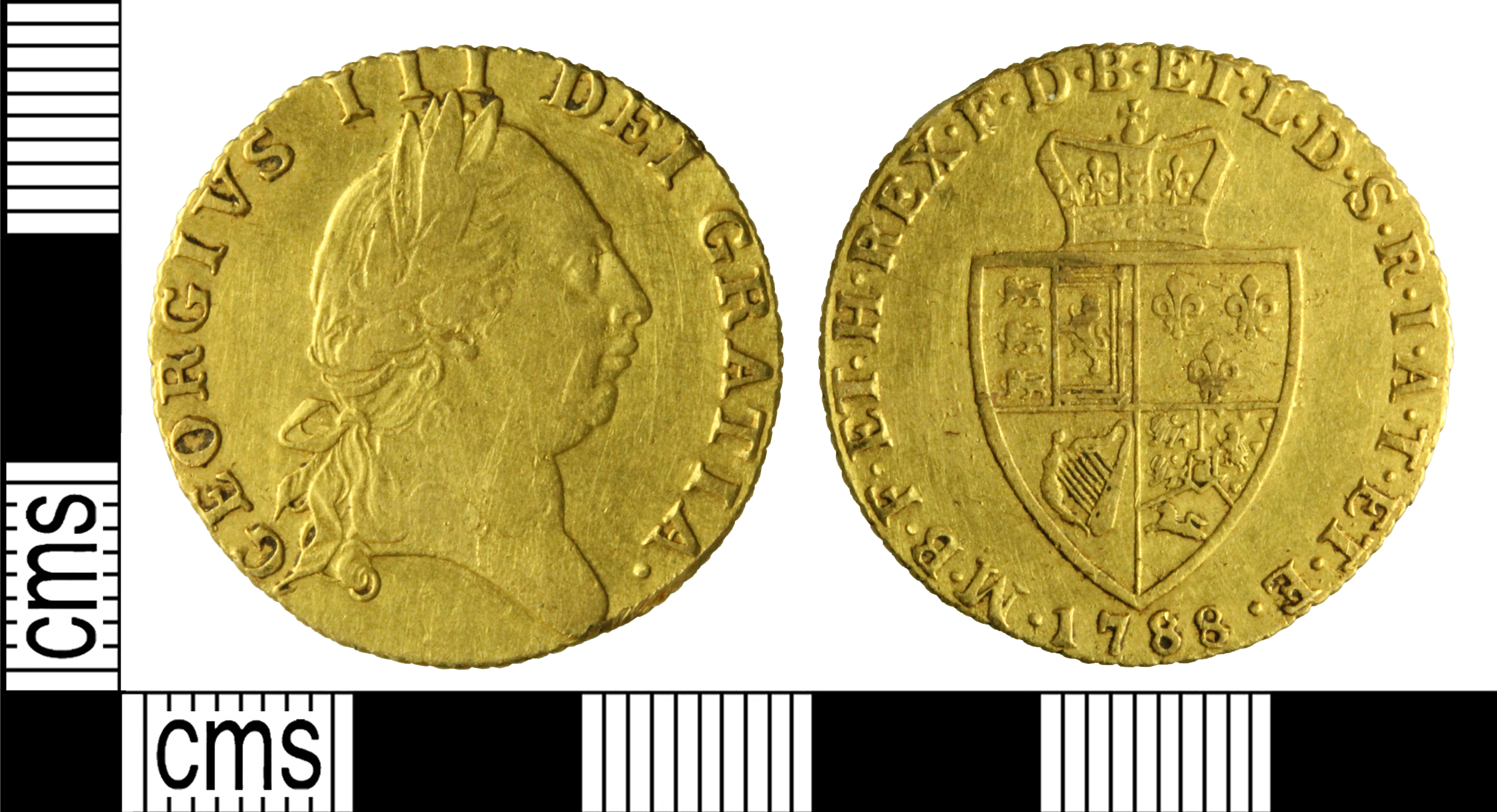
A gold guinea coin of George III, dated 1788 and found in North Newnton

Rainscombe was transferred to Wilcot parish in 1885, and Bottlesford was transferred from Manningford parish sometime after 1971.

== Amenities ==
The Anglican Church of St James dates from the 13th century and is Grade II* listed. The church at West Knoyle, some twenty miles distant and also within a manor of Wilton Abbey, was a chapelry of North Newnton until the two parishes were separated in 1841.

The medieval settlement of North Newnton, by the church, has a small number of houses and a farm. Housing was built to the southeast in the 20th century, around the crossroads on the A345 to Pewsey. A pub, the Woodbridge Inn (built in the early 19th century) stands at the crossroads.

Hilcott has a village hall.

== Governance ==
North Newnton is a civil parish with an elected parish council. Most significant local government services are provided by the Wiltshire Council unitary authority, with its headquarters in Trowbridge. In the House of Commons the parish is part of the East Wiltshire constituency.
