= Savernake, Wiltshire =

Civil parish in Wiltshire, England

Coordinates: 51.397°N 1.710°W

Savernake
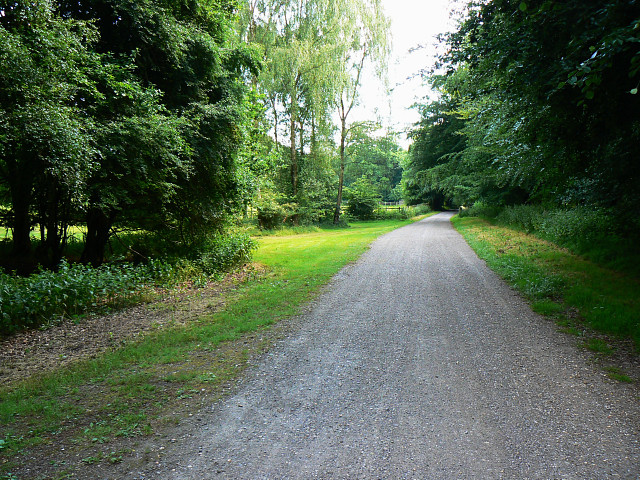
- Track from the A346, near Cadley

- Location within Wiltshire
- Population: 286 (in 2011)
- OS grid reference: SU2066
- Civil parish: Savernake
- Unitary authority: Wiltshire
- Ceremonial county: Wiltshire
- Region: South West
- Country: England
- Sovereign state: United Kingdom
- Post town: Marlborough
- Postcode district: SN8
- Dialling code: 01672
- Police: Wiltshire
- Fire: Dorset and Wiltshire
- Ambulance: South Western
- UK Parliament: East Wiltshire
- Website: Parish Council

Savernake is a civil parish immediately south and southeast of Marlborough in Wiltshire, England. The settlements in the parish are the hamlets of Cadley, Clench Common and Forest Hill. Savernake Forest covers the eastern half of the parish.

== History ==
Two Roman roads cross the parish, one from Mildenhall to Old Salisbury and the other between Cirencester and Winchester. There is a Romano-British kiln site in the forest.

The eastern end of Wansdyke, an early medieval defensive earthwork, is in the northeast of the parish.

A 2009 study by English Heritage (now Historic England) examined aerial photographs of Savernake Forest together with data from a 2007 Lidar survey carried out for the Forestry Commission. Many new archaeological sites were found, ranging from the Neolithic to the Second World War.

== Cadley ==
The hamlet of Cadley (grid reference SU 207 665) is at the edge of Savernake Forest, on the A346 between Marlborough and Burbage.

An Anglican church, Christchurch, was built by T.H. Wyatt in 1851 for the Marquess of Ailesbury. It was closed in 1975 and declared redundant in 1979, then sold for residential use.

== Clench Common ==
The hamlet of Clench Common (grid reference SU 172 656) is a small agricultural community in the northwest of the parish, on the A345 between Marlborough and Pewsey. It is 2 miles (3.2 km) north of the hamlet of Clench which is in Milton Lilbourne parish.

Clench Common Airfield is a grass strip about 1 mile (1.6 km) east of the hamlet, used by microlight aircraft.

== Local government ==
The parish elects a parish council. It is in the area of Wiltshire Council unitary authority, which is responsible for all significant local government functions.

Savernake parish was created in 1934, with boundary changes in 1987; predecessor parishes were North Savernake and South Savernake (with Brimslade and Cadley).

== Canal and railways ==
When the Kennet and Avon Canal was opened in 1810 it crossed the parish, which extended further south than the present-day parish. Wootton Top Lock was formerly known as Cadley Lock.

The Berks and Hants line, part of a Great Western Railway route from London to Devon and Cornwall, was built close to the canal in 1862. Savernake station (later Savernake Low Level) was beyond the southeast border of the parish, towards Burbage. On 14 November 1941 the station was the scene of the tragic death of Edward Huskinson, who had been the editor of the Tatler magazine for 32 years, after he became stuck between a train and the platform edge. The station closed in 1966 but the line remains open; the nearest stations are at Bedwyn and Pewsey.

A branch – the Marlborough Railway – between Savernake Low Level and Marlborough was built through the parish in 1864. In 1896 the Swindon, Marlborough and Andover Railway built another line between a second Marlborough station and a second Savernake station, Savernake High Level, near to the first. The original branch line closed in 1933, the High Level station closed in 1961 and Low Level (by then renamed Savernake for Marlborough) in 1966; the line was later removed.

During World War II a large ammunition store was established north of Savernake station, with sidings for rail to road transfer.

== Schools ==
A National School was opened at Cadley in 1850. It closed owing to low numbers of pupils in 1939. Today the local schools are at Marlborough, Burbage and St Katharines (near Tottenham House, just over the boundary with Great Bedwyn parish).

== See also ==
- Marquess of Ailesbury – landowners
- Tottenham House – built for the 1st Marquess of Ailesbury, about 1 mile (1.6 km) beyond the southeast boundary of the parish
