= Wootton Rivers =

Village in Wiltshire, England

Coordinates: 51.367°N 1.718°W

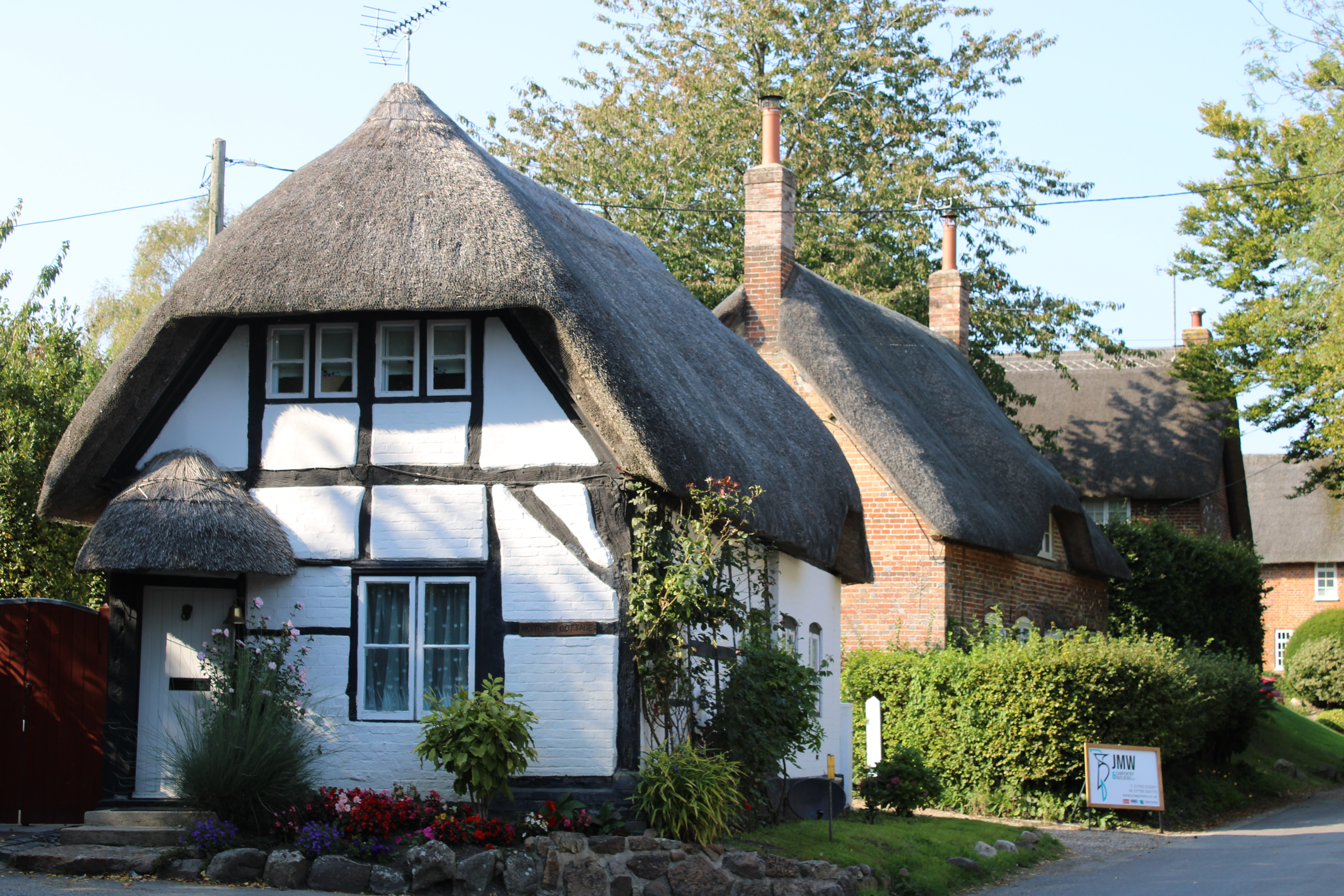
- Cottages at Wootton Rivers

- Location within Wiltshire
- Population: 228 (in 2011)
- OS grid reference: SU197631
- Civil parish: Wootton Rivers
- Unitary authority: Wiltshire
- Ceremonial county: Wiltshire
- Region: South West
- Country: England
- Sovereign state: United Kingdom
- Post town: Marlborough
- Postcode district: SN8
- Dialling code: 01672
- Police: Wiltshire
- Fire: Dorset and Wiltshire
- Ambulance: South Western
- UK Parliament: East Wiltshire
- Website: Parish Council

Wootton Rivers is a small village and civil parish in the Vale of Pewsey, Wiltshire, England. The village lies about 3 miles (5 km) northeast of Pewsey and 4 miles (6 km) south of Marlborough. During the 20th century its population halved and most of its facilities closed.

The parish includes the hamlet of Cuckoo's Knob.

== History ==
A group of five Bronze Age round barrows lies on high ground in the northeast of the parish. Domesday Book recorded a settlement at Otone in 1086, with 69 households, two churches, and land held by Mont-Saint-Michel Abbey, Normandy. The name Wootton Rivers was in use in the 14th century: 'Wootton' meant 'farm by the wood' and 'Rivers' was the surname of the lords of the manor. An eastern part of the parish was part of Savernake Forest in the 14th century, but today the edge of the forest is just beyond the northeast corner of the parish.

The population of the parish peaked at 470 in 1841, and has remained below 300 since 1921. A gazetteer of 1872 mentioned that there was then a post-office, an iron foundry and an agricultural implement factory in the village, and that the church ran a national school. The school opened in 1845 and closed in 1979 owing to falling numbers of pupils. A Methodist chapel was opened at the north end of the village in 1881 and closed in 1967; the building is now a private house.

The tithing of Brimslade, to the east, was transferred to the parish from Savernake in 1987; the only dwelling there is Brimslade House, with its farm.

Most of the village was designated a conservation area in 1975 and contains some 25 buildings dating from before 1800. Remaining amenities include a village hall and a pub, the Royal Oak, housed in a 16th-century building.

== Notable buildings ==
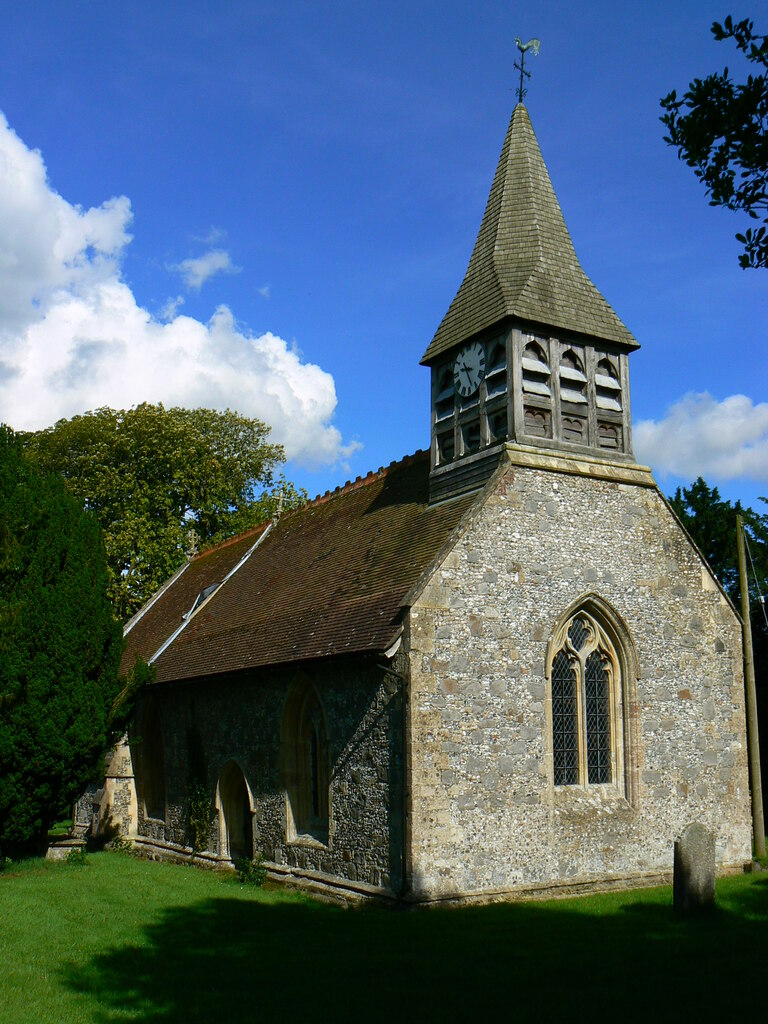
St Andrew's Church

The Church of England parish church of St Andrew stands towards the south of the village, and is built in flint and sarsen with limestone dressings. The mid 14th century building was thoroughly restored in 1861 by G. E. Street, and was designated as Grade II* listed in 1964.

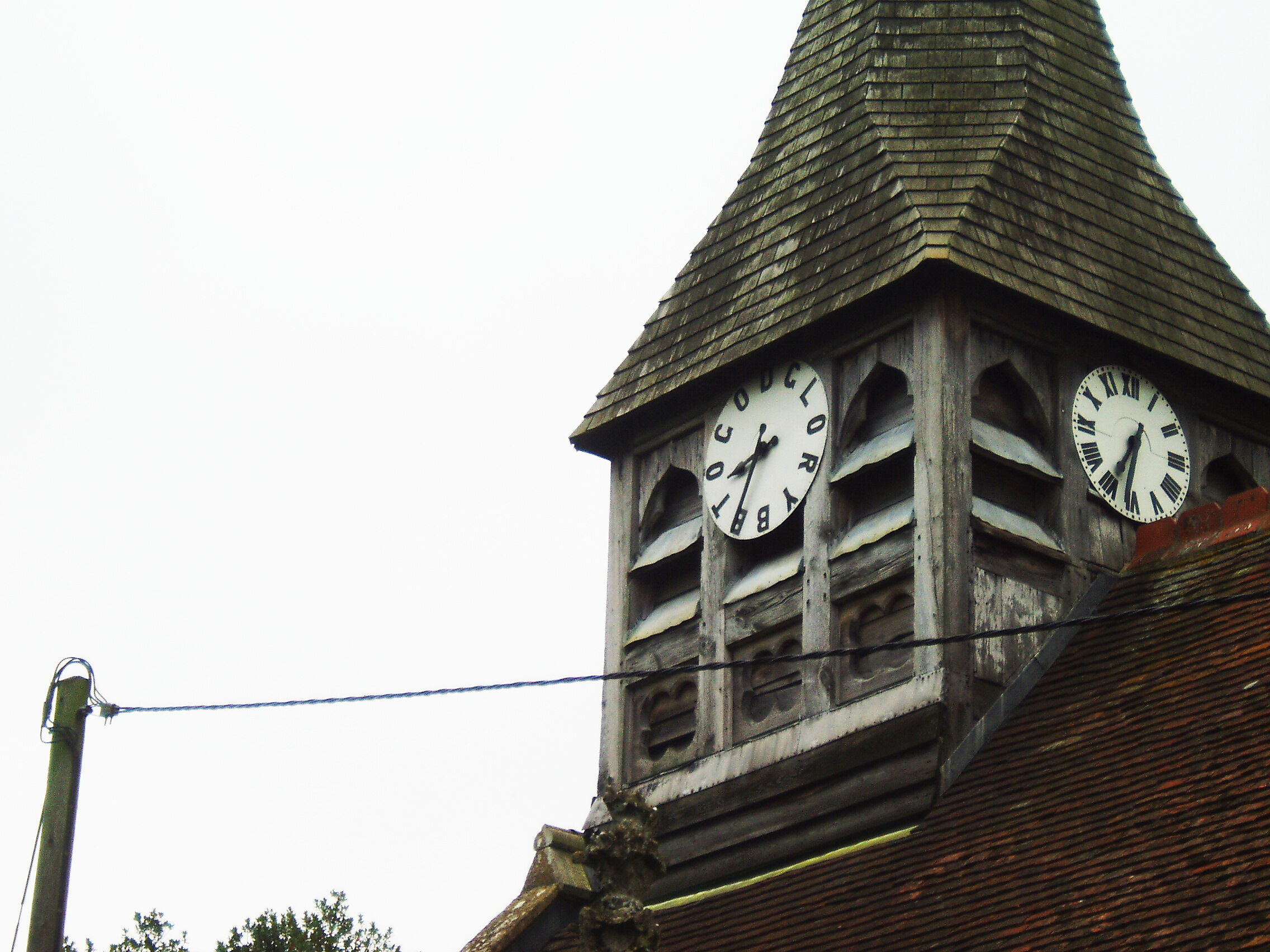
Bell-turret and clock faces

The former rectory house, opposite the start of the lane leading to the church, is an imposing redbrick building of the mid-18th century, with a five-bay front, two storeys and an attic.

In 1991 the rectory was united with Pewsey, Easton Royal and Milton Lilbourne, and today the church is part of the Vale of Pewsey group, alongside 15 others.

The oldest part of the Grade II* listed Manor House, southeast of the church, is a wing of a 15th-century house, built in limestone. After alterations and extensions in the 16th and 18th centuries the house is mostly timber-framed under a thatched roof; nearby is a barn, late 18th century or early 19th, of similar construction. Church Farmhouse, on the village street just north of the church, began as a timber-framed house in the 17th century and was rebuilt with a tile-hung upper storey. Brimslade Farmhouse (16th century) is also Grade II* listed.

== Transport ==
The roads in the parish are all minor. Pewsey can be reached via the B3087, to the south of the parish, and Marlborough via the A345 and A346, to the west and east respectively.

The Kennet and Avon Canal was built close to the southern end of Wootton Rivers village around 1807 and was opened fully in 1810. Wootton Rivers Lock had a keeper's house and an associated wharf. The canal was restored in the 1970s and the lock was reopened in 1973. In 1988 the lock was part of the location for a BBC television comedy series, The River.

The Reading to Taunton railway was built to the south of the canal in 1862; the nearest station is Pewsey. In 1928 a small station, Wootton Rivers Halt, was built near the road bridge at the southern end of the village. The station was closed in 1966 when local services on the line were withdrawn.
