= St Andrew's Church, Wootton Rivers =

St Andrews's Church, Wootton Rivers
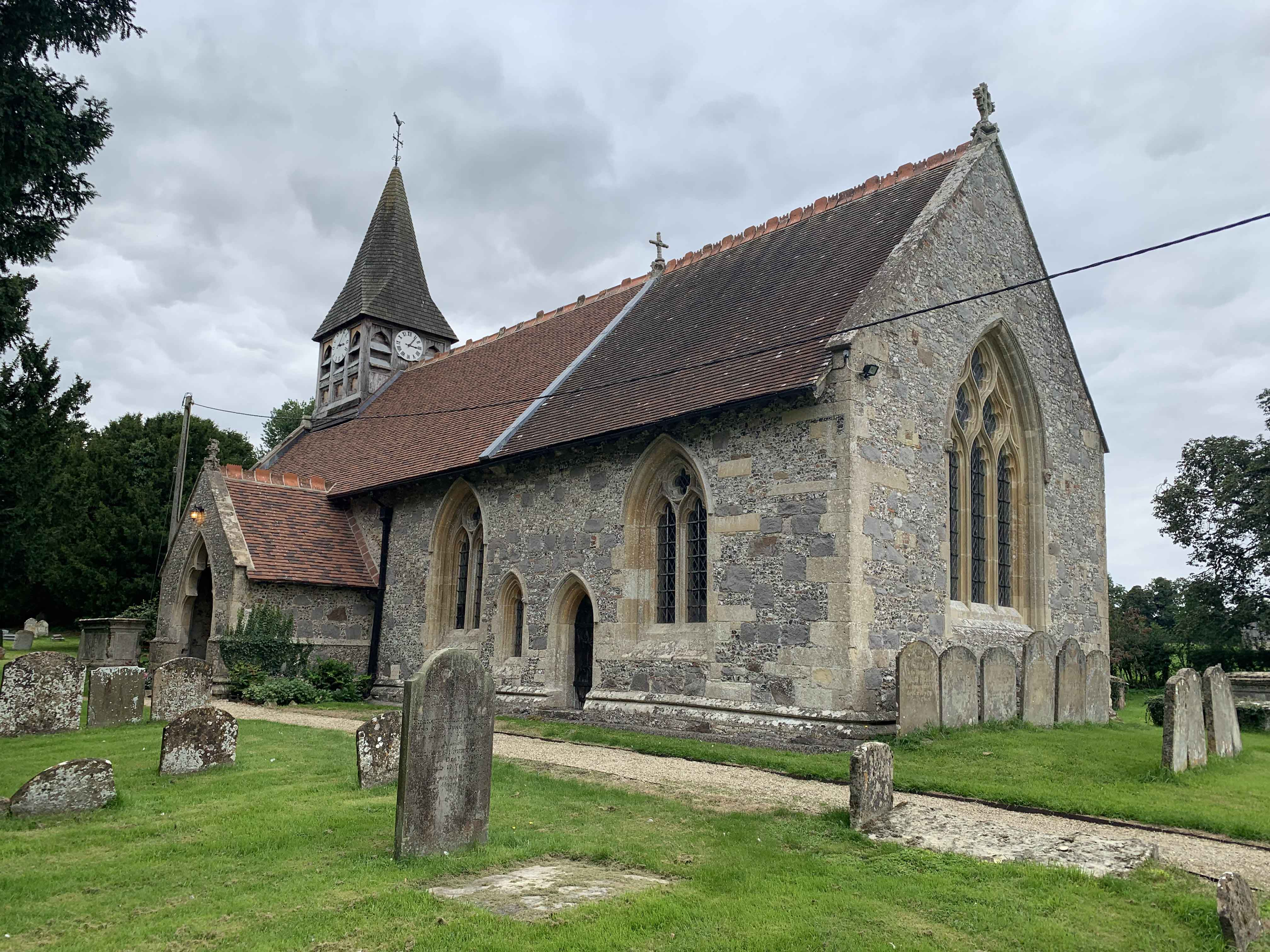
- St Andrew's Church, Wootton Rivers
- St Andrews's Church, Wootton Rivers
- OS grid reference: SU 19679 62948
- Location: Wootton Rivers
- Country: England
- Denomination: Church of England

Architecture
- Heritage designation: Grade II* listed
- Style: Early English
- Years built: 14th century

Administration
- Parish: Wootton Rivers

The Church of England parish church of St Andrew, Wootton Rivers in the village of Wootton Rivers, Wiltshire, England, is built in flint and sarsen with limestone dressings. The mid 14th century building was thoroughly restored in 1861 by G. E. Street, and was designated as Grade II* listed in 1964.

== History ==
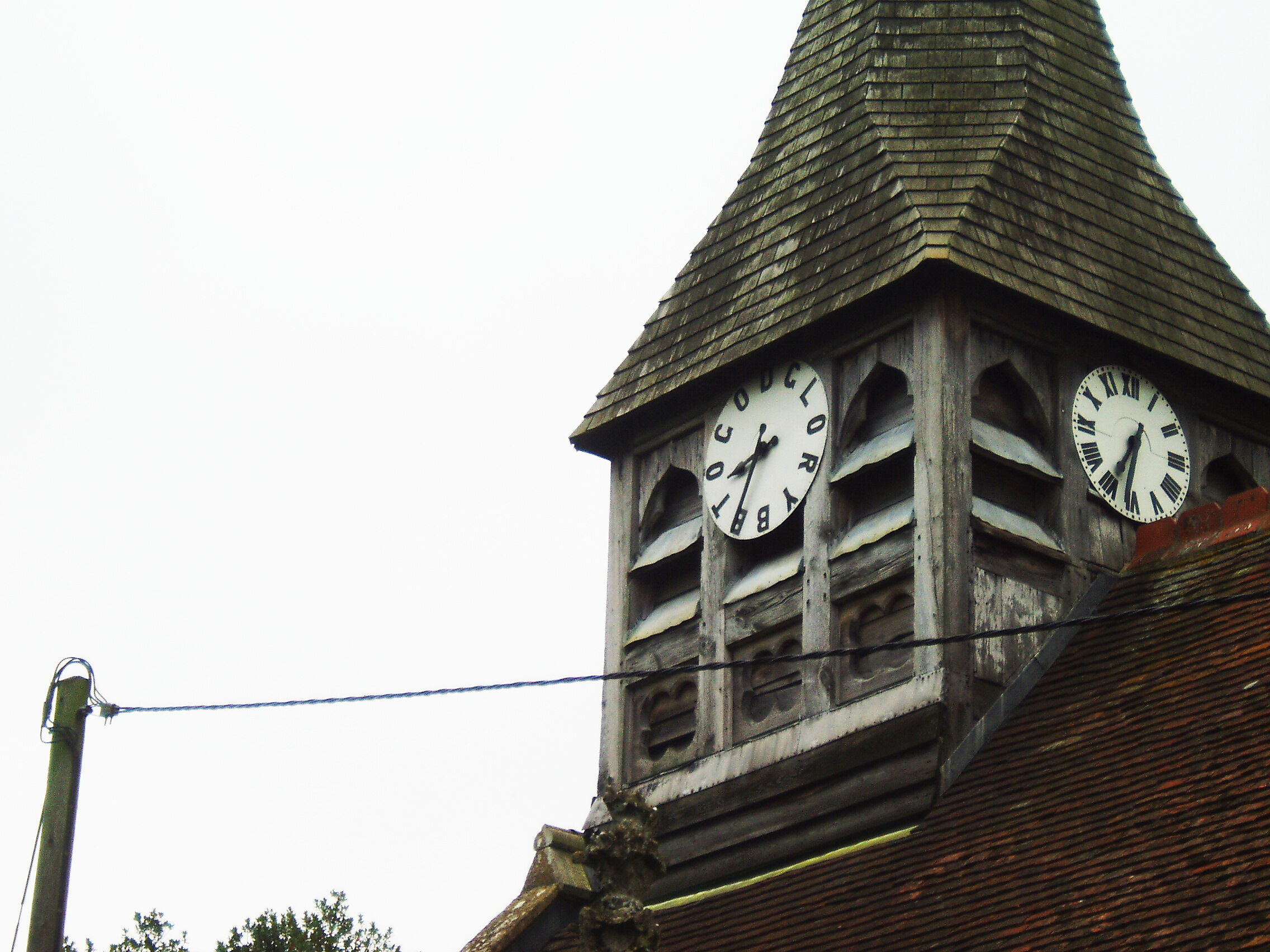
Bell-turret and clock faces

St Andrew's has Saxon origins, being built in the grounds of the Saxon manor house. The church was built in the 14th century and the limestone font dates from this period.

The bell-turret at the west end, under a shingled broached spire, has five bells cast in 1793 and a sixth added in 1999. The turret carries an unusual clock made by a local craftsman in 1911 to commemorate the coronation of George V. One of its three faces has the letters GLORY.BE.TO.GOD instead of numerals. Its chiming mechanism is like that of a musical box and plays six distinct tunes.

The carving on the pulpit was remade in the 1861 restoration.

The former rectory house, opposite the start of the lane leading to the church, is an imposing redbrick building of the mid 18th century, with a five-bay front, two storeys and an attic.

In 1991 the rectory was united with Pewsey, Easton Royal and Milton Lilbourne, and today the church is part of the Vale of Pewsey group, alongside 15 others.
