= Milton Lilbourne =

Village and civil parish in Wiltshire, England

Coordinates: 51.342°N 1.729°W

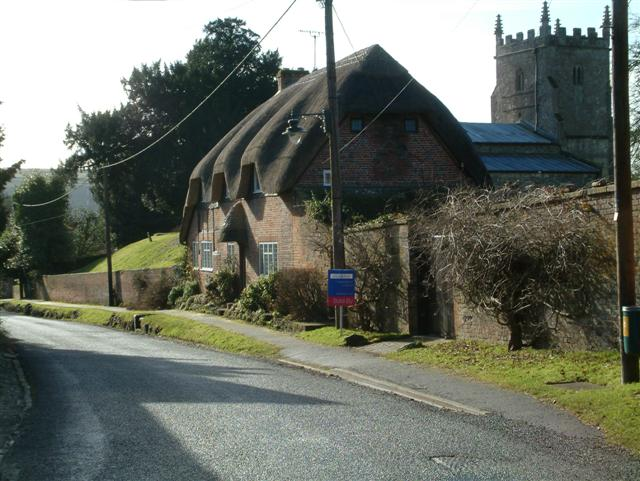
- Cottages in Milton Lilbourne

- Location within Wiltshire
- Population: 534 (in 2011)
- OS grid reference: SU190604
- Civil parish: Milton Lilbourne
- Unitary authority: Wiltshire
- Ceremonial county: Wiltshire
- Region: South West
- Country: England
- Sovereign state: United Kingdom
- Post town: Pewsey
- Postcode district: SN9
- Dialling code: 01672
- Police: Wiltshire
- Fire: Dorset and Wiltshire
- Ambulance: South Western
- UK Parliament: East Wiltshire
- Website: Parish Council

Milton Lilbourne is a village and civil parish in the county of Wiltshire, England, in the Vale of Pewsey between Pewsey and Burbage. It is largely a mixed residential area centred on the Manor. The nearest town is Marlborough, 5.5 miles (8.9 km) to the north.

The parish includes the following hamlets:

- Clench – to the north, near Wootton Rivers
- Fyfield with Fyfield Manor – west, near Pewsey (not to be confused with the village of Fyfield near Marlborough)
- Little Salisbury – west, on the Pewsey-Burbage road
- Littleworth – north, on the other side of the Pewsey-Burbage road
- Milkhouse Water, formerly Milcot Water – northwest, by the Avon
- New Mill – north, also by the Avon

The parish is unusual in that it has a long thin shape and is one of the few to have boundaries on the uplands to both south and north of the Vale. The southern boundary passes by a long barrow and the northern one abuts the prehistoric fort on Martinsell Hill.

== History ==
The parish contains several prehistoric features including the Giants Grave to the south (a Neolithic long barrow) and a Bronze Age Barrow Cemetery at Milton Hill Farm.

"Milton" in the village's name probably derives from its position as "middle tun" between Pewsey and Easton Royal, the "east tun". "Lilbourne" is from Lillebonne, the surname of lords of the manor.

The Manor House dates from c.1710 and is Grade II* listed.

== Parish church ==
There was a vicarage here by 1195. The parish church of St Peter is in squared and coursed rubble with stone dressings, and ashlar copings and battlements. When the chancel was rebuilt in the 14th century, the jambs of the arch of the 12th-century church were retained; the four-bay north arcade is from the 13th century.

Restoration of the chancel in 1859 was to designs of G.E. Street, and in 1875 J. L. Pearson retired the nave, aisle and porch. The northwest tower has six bells, five of them cast by Robert Wells II in 1789. The building was recorded as Grade II* listed in 1959.

The benefice was united with Easton Royal in 1929, and with Pewsey and Wootton Rivers in 1991. Today the parish is part of the Vale of Pewsey team of churches, centered on St John's, Pewsey.

== Transport ==
The Kennet and Avon Canal crosses the parish, using the Avon valley. The Reading to Taunton railway follows the same route; the nearest station is Pewsey. From 1928 to 1966 there was a halt at Wootton Rivers, a short distance outside the parish.

== Amenities ==
Facilities include the Village Hall with its playing fields. On the Pewsey-Burbage road in the area known as Little Salisbury stood the Three Horse Shoes pub, closed in 2009. The nearest shops are in Pewsey, about 2 miles (3.2 km) away.
