= Manningford Halt railway station =

Former railway station in England

Manningford Halt

General information
- Location: Manningford, Wiltshire; England
- Coordinates: 51.3354°N 1.8020°W
- Platforms: 2

Other information
- Status: Disused

History
- Original company: Great Western Railway
- Post-grouping: Great Western Railway

Key dates
- 20 June 1932: Opened
- 18 April 1966: Closed
Location

Manningford Halt is a former railway station which opened in 1932 in Manningford parish, Wiltshire, England on the Berks and Hants Extension Railway between Pewsey and Devizes. The halt closed in 1966 when local services were withdrawn.

The halt was about half a mile north of both Manningford Abbots and Manningford Bruce, west of the bridge carrying the Wilcot road over the railway, which had opened in 1862. The two platforms each had a small corrugated iron shelter.

The station was demolished after closure leaving no trace of its existence. The track remains open as part of the Reading–Taunton line.

| Preceding station | Historical railways | Following station |
|---|---|---|
| Pewsey; Line and station open | Great Western Railway; Berks and Hants Railway | Woodborough; Line open, station closed |
