= Kintbury railway station =

Railway station serving the village of Kintbury, Berkshire, England

Kintbury
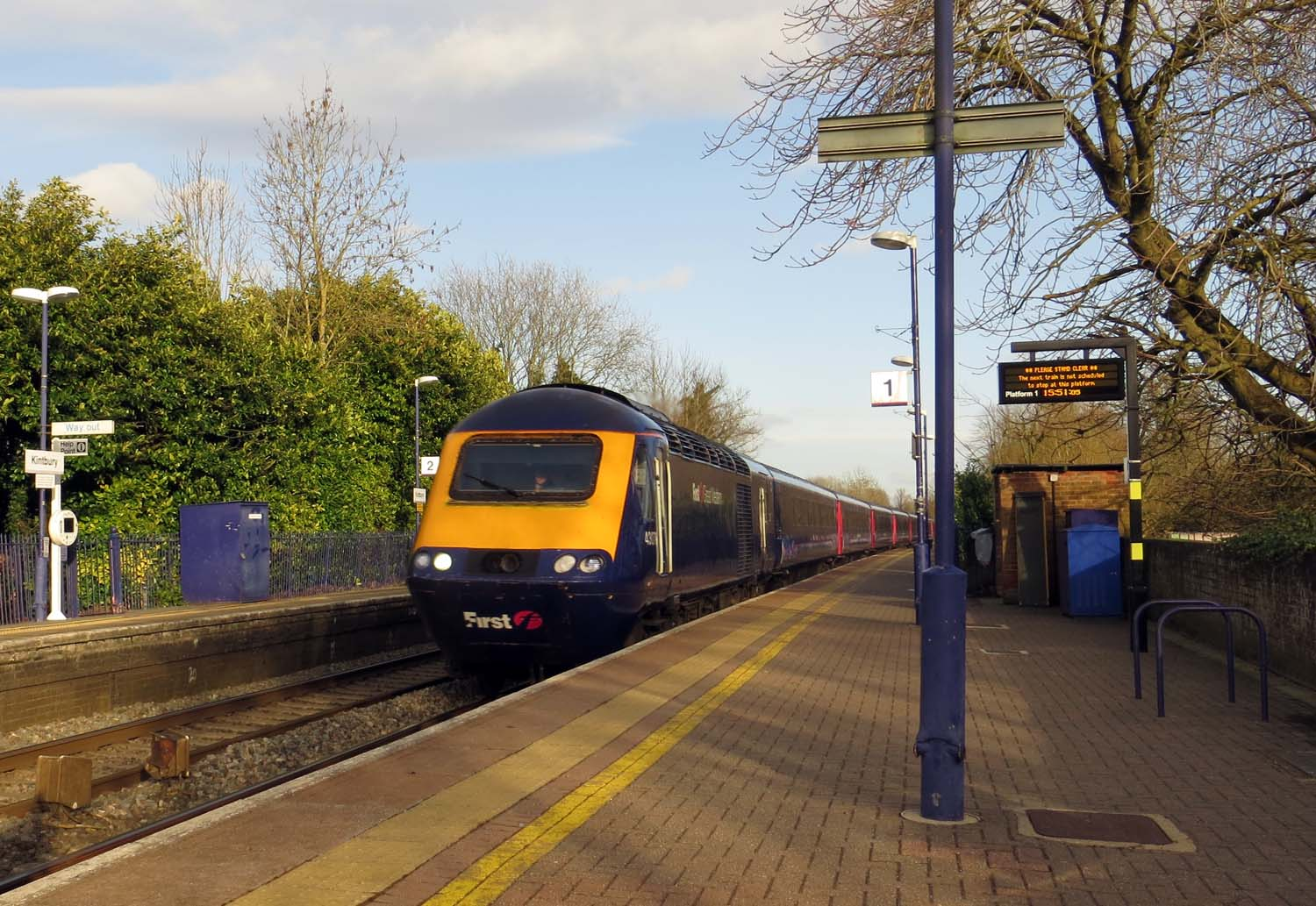
- Kintbury railway station in 2014

General information
- Location: Kintbury, West Berkshire; England
- Coordinates: 51.4027°N 1.4459°W
- Grid reference: SU386672
- Managed by: Great Western Railway
- Platforms: 2

Other information
- Station code: KIT
- Classification: DfT category F1

Passengers
- 2020/21: ▼24,414
- 2021/22: ▲63,078
- 2022/23: ▲65,194
- 2023/24: ▲70,722
- 2024/25: ▲75,280
Location
Notes
- Passenger statistics from the Office of Rail and Road

Kintbury railway station serves the village of Kintbury in Berkshire, England. It is situated on the Reading to Taunton Line, 58 miles 38 chains (58.48 miles, 94.11 km) from London Paddington.

== History ==
The station was opened in 1847, along with the first portion of the Berks and Hants Railway as far as Hungerford. This was subsequently extended to Devizes and Westbury in 1862 and ultimately to Cogload Junction near Taunton by 1906. The station has a level crossing at its western end, controlled from a nearby crossing box that also remotely supervises the ones at Hamstead and Hungerford (though this will eventually be abolished and control transferred to the Thames Valley ROC at Didcot by CCTV).

== Services ==
Great Western Railway local trains between Newbury and Bedwyn provide the service here. Trains call hourly each way (with peak extras) on weekdays and Saturdays and every two hours each way on Sundays. Some early morning and mid/late evening trains run as far as Reading and/or London Paddington.

Services at the station were disrupted throughout 2021 due to cracks found in the Intercity Express Trains, causing the loss of the regular direct service to London which it previously had (although there are some direct services in peak times). Since 2021, there has been a diesel shuttle between Newbury and Bedwyn; 5 years later, despite the cracks being resolved and continued complaints, this service is still in operation. Rail (magazine) reported GWR's position on the matter, saying

The [Bedwyn Trains] passenger group has been in regular contact with GWR, which has told customers it does not know when regular Bedwyn services might be restored. The operator has said it would not be possible to restore even one of the train sets used on the route, which would enable one third of through services. It also told the passenger group that it would not be possible for trains serving nearby Pewsey to make additional stops.

Preceding station	National Rail	Following station
Newbury	Great Western Railway; Reading to Taunton line Local services	Hungerford
