= Lindsay Bashford =

Academic, journalist, novelist and soldier

Radclyffe James Lindsay Bashford OBE
- Born: 6 February 1881; London, England
- Died: 20 August 1921 (aged 40)
- Education: University of Edinburgh; Ecole Libre des Sciences Politiques
- Spouse: Catherine Lovibond
- Father: Frederick Bashford
- Writing career
- Notable works: Everybody's Boy (1912); Splendrum (1914); Cupid in the Car (1914)
- Military career
- Allegiance: British
- Branch: Royal Army Service Corps
- Service years: 1915–1919
- Rank: Staff-Major
- Battles: Gallipoli campaign

Major Radclyffe James Lindsay Bashford OBE (6 February 1881 – 20 August 1921) was at various times in his relatively brief life, an academic, journalist, novelist and soldier. He was employed by both Joseph Pulitzer and Alfred Harmsworth, 1st Viscount Northcliffe and is best remembered as the Literary Editor of the Daily Mail from 1906 to 1914.

== Early life ==
The son of Frederick Bashford, Lindsay Bashford was born on 6 February 1881 in London. His brother Henry Howarth Bashford was a physician and novelist. He was educated at Bedford Modern School, at schools in Germany, at the University of Edinburgh and the Ecole Libre des Sciences Politiques in Paris.

== France ==
In 1902, Bashford was appointed Lecturer in English Literature at the University of Bordeaux, a position he held for just one year. In the summer of 1903 Joseph Pulitzer, bibliophile and owner of the New York World, had established himself at Etretat in Normandy and was advertising for a new member of his secretariat. In July 1903 Bashford successfully applied for the position. Pulitzer was by all accounts a demanding and irascible man; the previous incumbent had requested a transfer due to the tensions of working daily with his employer. One well qualified candidate had been discarded for having "an anxious and worried expression", and another for being a noisy walker and Bashford did well to survive for over a year in the job.

== The Daily Mail ==
In 1905 he returned to England and took up a position as a reporter on The Daily News, and in 1906 he was appointed the new Literary Editor of the Daily Mail. Alfred Harmsworth wanted Bashford to exploit the interest in Literature amongst the growing ranks of the British middle-classes through commissioning the best writers of the day, including Thomas Hardy and Joseph Conrad, to contribute to the paper. Conrad regularly complained to Bashford about the late or non-payment of fees, and the trivial and undemanding nature of the books he was expected to review, and the two kept up a lively correspondence; for example, this undated letter from 1912 or 1913:

Dear Mr Bashford

I am immensely flattered by your invitation to fill up the cracks in the Silly Season. But I haven't by me the kind of putty that would suit the taste of your readers. The article I keep is much too expensive for the dear old impecunious Daily Mail. The sight of virtue struggling with adversity is always touching, but all I can contribute is a tear-till that little matter of five pounds owing me for an article is settled either by a cheque or by a plain statement of an inability to pay which I could leave amongst my papers as a document pour servir for the secret history of our times.

Yours Truly

J. Conrad

== Novels ==
Lindsay Bashford had three of his own novels published: Everybody's Boy (1912), Splendrum (1914) and Cupid in the Car (1914). The latter, a story of romantic misadventures during a motoring holiday in France, was enjoyed by the reviewer at Punch.

== War ==
As tensions grew in Europe in 1914, the Mail sent Bashford to Vienna and Rome as special correspondent to report on the developing crisis. Back in England after the outbreak of War he was commissioned into the Royal Army Service Corps. He fought at Gallipoli in 1915 and served in Egypt and Palestine until 1919, rising to the rank of Staff-Major. He was mentioned in despatches 3 times and awarded the OBE.

== Later life ==
In 1919 he returned to the Daily Mail as a foreign correspondent in France, Germany, Poland and the Baltic States. He suffered, however, from ill health as a consequence of his war service and died on 20 August 1921. He left a widow, Catherine Lovibond, who was later to marry Rowland Allanson-Winn, 5th Baron Headley the aristocratic convert to Islam also known as Saif Rahmatullah al-Farooq.
