= Savernake Low Level railway station =

Former railway station in England

Coordinates: 51.3675°N 1.6621°W

Savernake Low Level
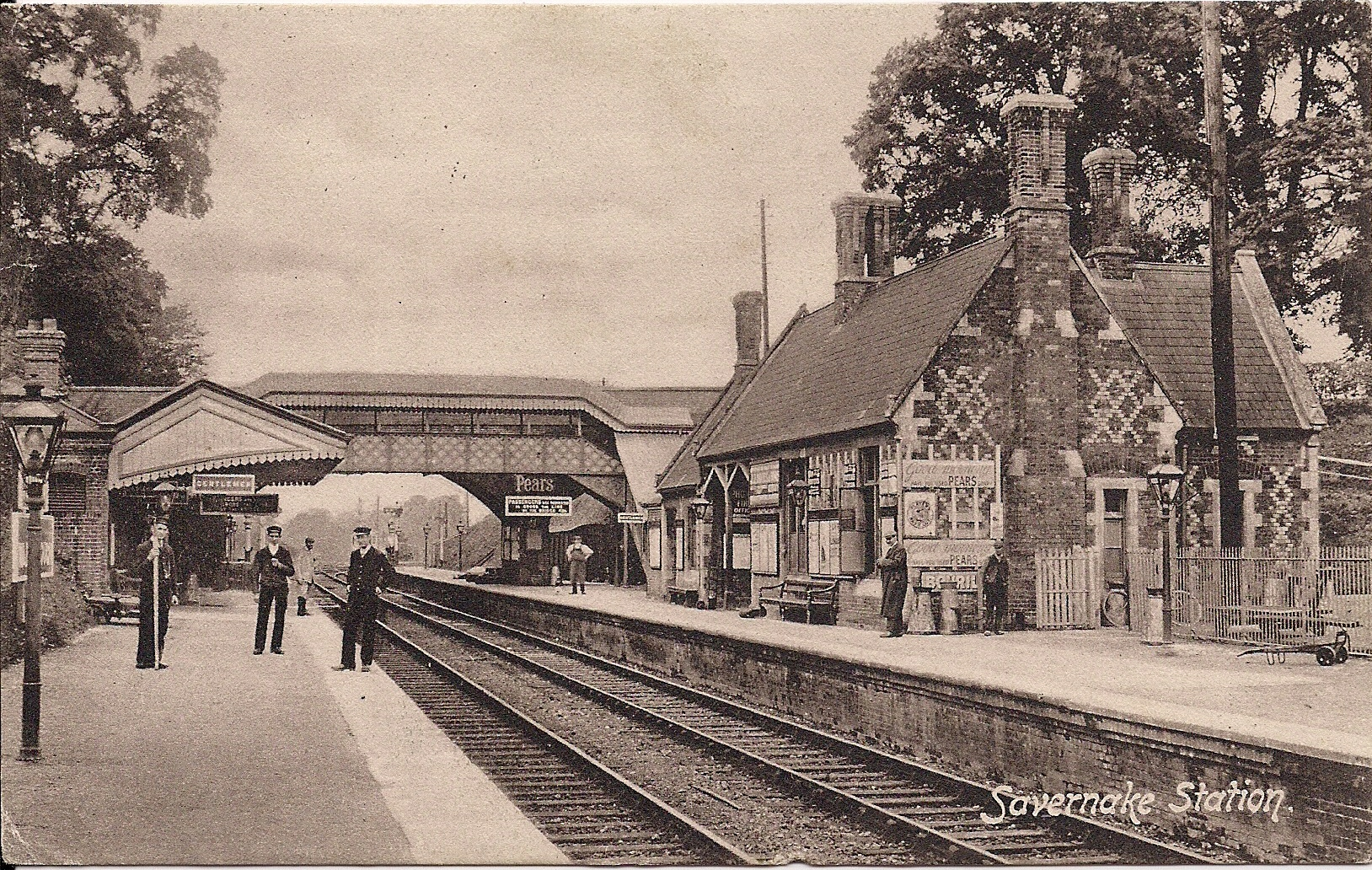

General information
- Location: Burbage, Wiltshire; England
- Grid reference: SU236632
- Platforms: 3

Other information
- Status: Disused

History
- Original company: Berks and Hants Extension Railway
- Pre-grouping: Great Western Railway
- Post-grouping: Great Western Railway

Key dates
- 11 November 1862: Opened as Savernake
- 1 July 1924: Renamed Savernake Low Level
- 11 September 1961: Renamed Savernake for Marlborough
- 18 April 1966: Closed
Location

Savernake Low Level railway station was a station on the Berks and Hants Extension Railway, near the village of Burbage in Wiltshire, England. It was open from 1862 until 1966.

== History ==
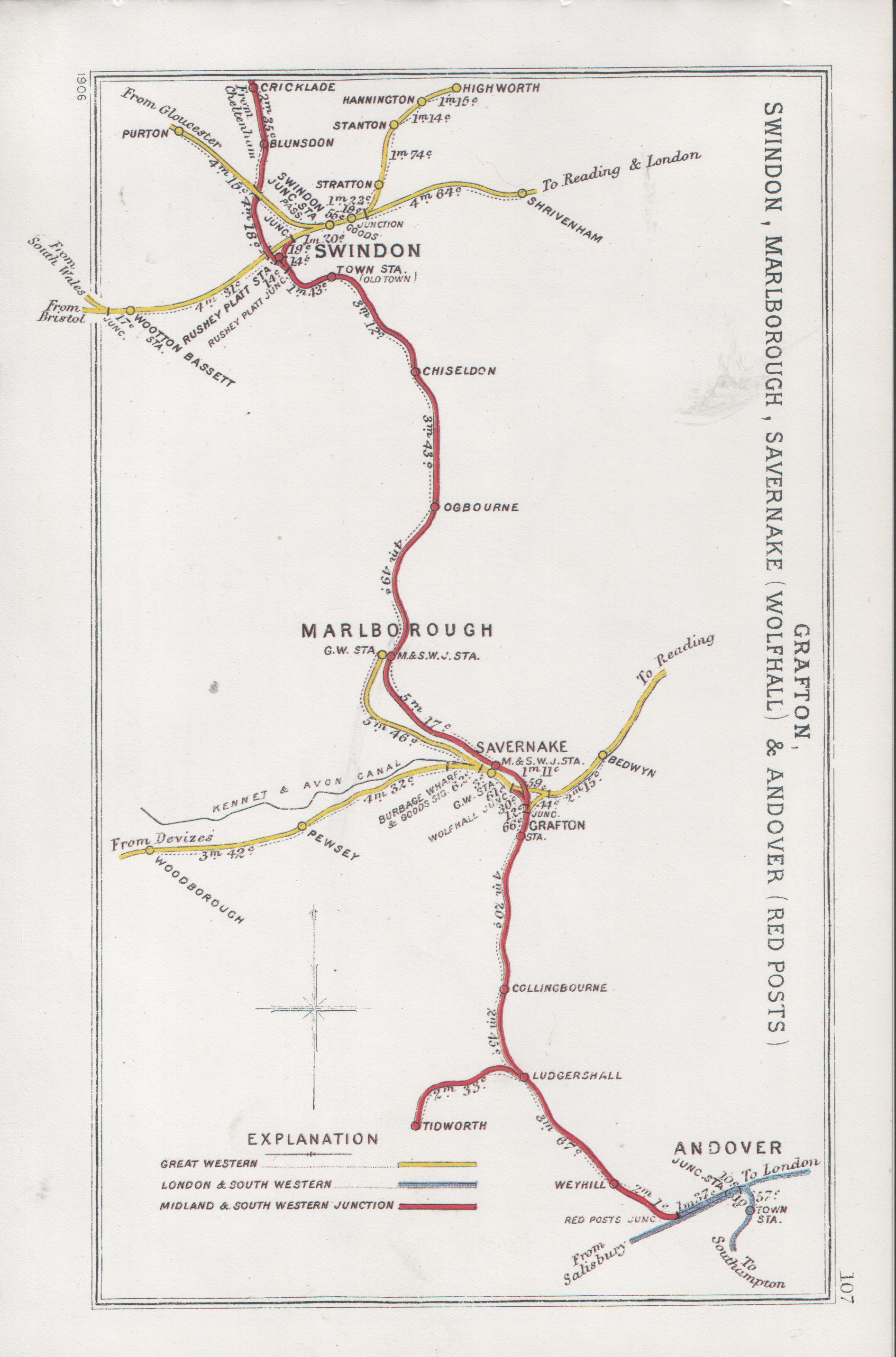
A 1906 Railway Clearing House map of railways in the vicinity of Savernake Low Level (shown here as G.W. STA.)

The Berks and Hants Extension Railway, which ran from Hungerford to Devizes, opened on 11 November 1862, and the station named Savernake was opened with the line. It was situated between Bedwyn and Pewsey stations, about 0.6 miles (1 km) northeast of the village of Burbage where the line passed under the road to Durley. The site is directly above the Bruce Tunnel which carries the Kennet and Avon Canal.

There was a goods station at Burbage Wharf, about three-quarters of a mile to the west, providing an interchange between the railway, the canal and the road to Marlborough. This was closed in 1947.

On 15 April 1864, the Marlborough Railway opened its short branch line to Marlborough, which was operated by the Great Western and then taken over by it, and Savernake became a junction.

When the Reading to Taunton line was created and the Stert to Westbury cut-off opened in 1900, the platforms at Savernake were lengthened, the footbridge roofed and brick waiting rooms provided on the down platform. Until 1916, Savernake then had six trains a day, plus up to six slip coaches from Paddington, the fastest covering the 70 mi (110 km) to Savernake in 75 minutes. In the 1950s Savernake had ten trains a day on the main line, seven to Marlborough and two other Midland and South Western Junction Railway trains.

On 1 July 1924, the station was renamed Savernake Low Level; the nearby station on the former Midland and South Western Junction Railway line becoming Savernake High Level at the same time.

The station was renamed Savernake for Marlborough on 11 September 1961 when the High Level station officially closed, although through trains on the former M&SWJR had used Savernake Low Level for some time because of a landslip on the original line.

The station closed on 18 April 1966 but the first-built line remains in use, providing a route from Reading and Hungerford to Westbury and beyond.

== Routes ==
Preceding station	Historical railways	Following station
Bedwyn; Line and station open	Great Western Railway; Berks and Hants Extension Railway	Wootton Rivers Halt; Line open, station closed
	Disused railways	
Marlborough High Level; Line and station closed	Great Western Railway; Marlborough branch	Terminus
Marlborough Low Level; Line and station closed	Midland and South Western Junction Railway; Swindon, Marlborough and Andover Railway	Grafton and Burbage; Line and station closed
