= Cadley, Wiltshire =

Cadley, Wiltshire can refer to two places in Wiltshire, England:

- Cadley, Collingbourne Ducis
- Cadley, Savernake

== See also ==
- Chute Cadley
