= Grafton and Burbage railway station =

Former railway station in Wiltshire, England

Coordinates: 51.3433°N 1.6453°W

Grafton and Burbage
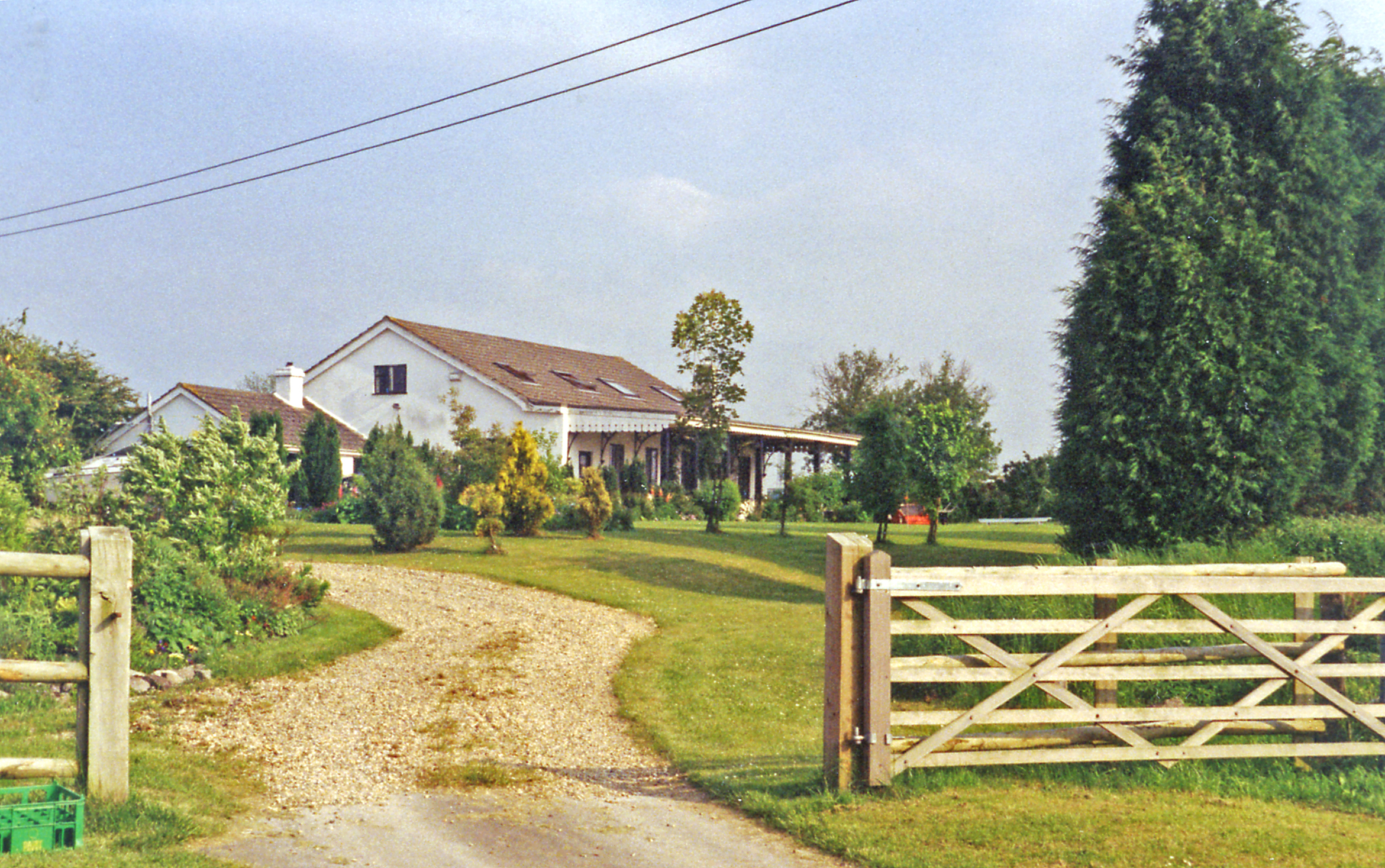
- Station buildings in 1994

General information
- Location: West Grafton, Wiltshire; England
- Grid reference: SU248605
- Platforms: 2

Other information
- Status: Disused

History
- Original company: Swindon, Marlborough and Andover Railway
- Pre-grouping: Midland and South Western Junction Railway
- Post-grouping: Great Western Railway

Key dates
- 1 May 1882: Opened
- 11 September 1961: Closed
Location

Grafton and Burbage railway station served the villages of Burbage and East and West Grafton in Wiltshire, England. The station was on the Midland and South Western Junction Railway. It opened in May 1882 as the northern terminus of the southern section of the Swindon, Marlborough and Andover Railway and became a through station when the line from Swindon was completed through a new Marlborough station and the Great Western Railway's Savernake station in February 1883.

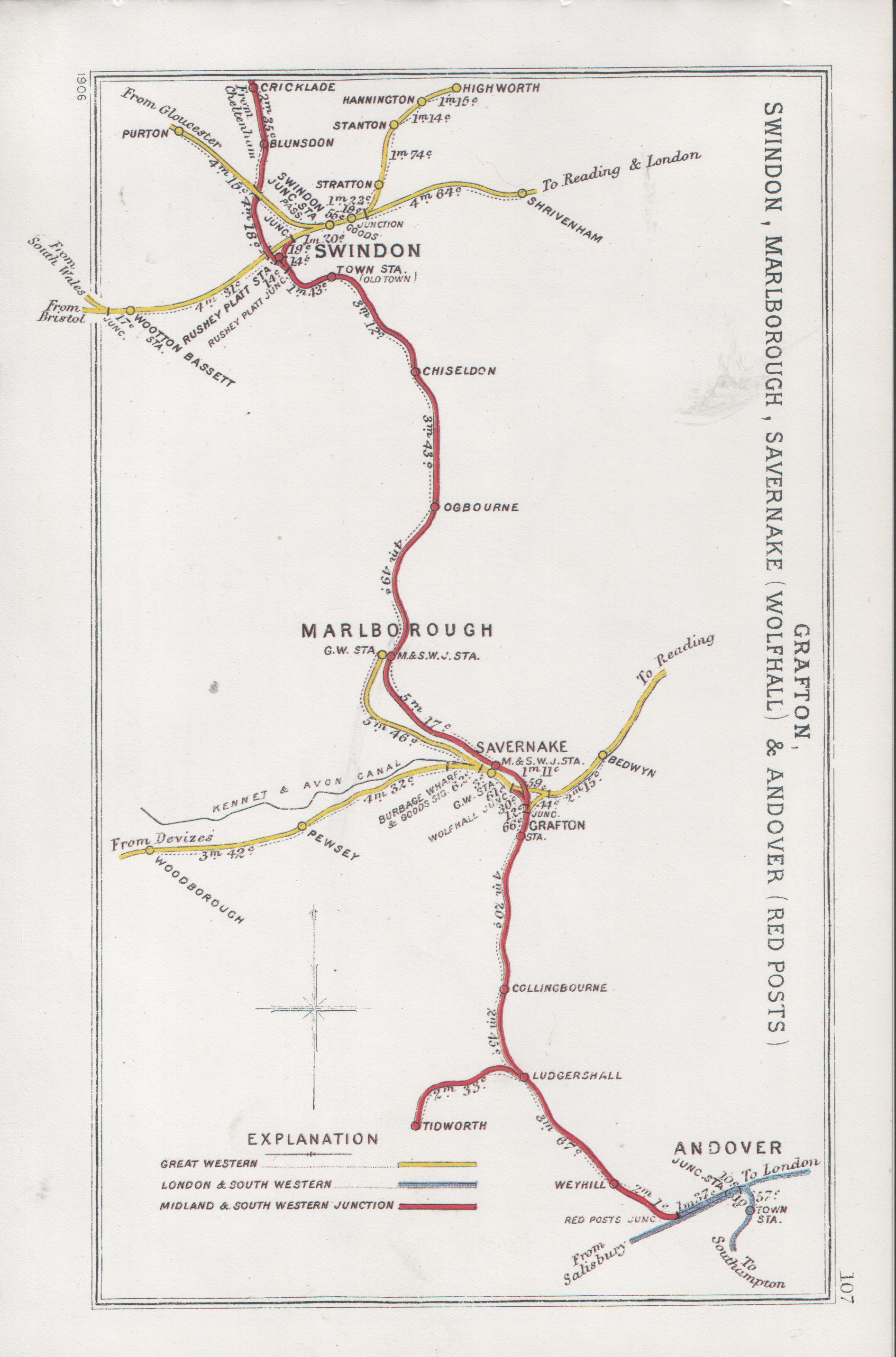
A 1906 Railway Clearing House map of railways in the vicinity of Grafton & Burbage (shown here as GRAFTON)

In 1883, a northwards extension, the Swindon and Cheltenham Extension Railway, opened from Swindon Town to Cirencester, with further northward extension to a junction with the Great Western Railway's Cheltenham to Banbury at Andoversford opening in 1891, enabling through trains from the Midlands to the south. The SM&AR and the S&CER amalgamated in 1884 to form the M&SWJR.

In 1898, a new section of line, called the Marlborough and Grafton Railway, was opened between the M&SWJR station in Marlborough and Grafton & Burbage station, with an intervening stop at a high level station at Savernake. This removed the need for M&SWJR trains to run on the GWR lines, though junctions to the GWR line heading both east and west were retained north of Grafton station.

Grafton and Burbage station was sited at West Grafton on a double-track section of the line. It had a small main building on the down platform (towards Andover), with a large signalbox that controlled what had become a complex junction. The up platform had a wooden shelter. There was a small goods yard to the north of the station. Station signs on the platforms referred to it as "Grafton" station; in timetables and on other printed material, however, it always appeared as "Grafton and Burbage".

As a whole, traffic on the M&SWJR fell steeply after the Second World War and the line closed to passengers in 1961, with goods facilities withdrawn from this section of the line at the same time. The station building has now been incorporated into a larger residential house, with the space between the platforms where the track ran forming part of the garden.

== Routes ==
| Preceding station | Disused railways | Following station |
|---|---|---|
| Bedwyn; Line closed, station open | Great Western Railway; Berks and Hants Extension Railway | Collingbourne Kingston Halt; Line and station closed |
| Savernake High Level; Line and station closed | Midland and South Western Junction Railway; Swindon, Marlborough and Andover Railway | Collingbourne Kingston Halt; Line and station closed |
| Savernake Low Level; Line and station closed | Midland and South Western Junction Railway; Swindon, Marlborough and Andover Railway | Collingbourne Kingston Halt; Line and station closed |
