= Wootton Rivers Halt railway station =

Former railway station in England

Wootton Rivers Halt
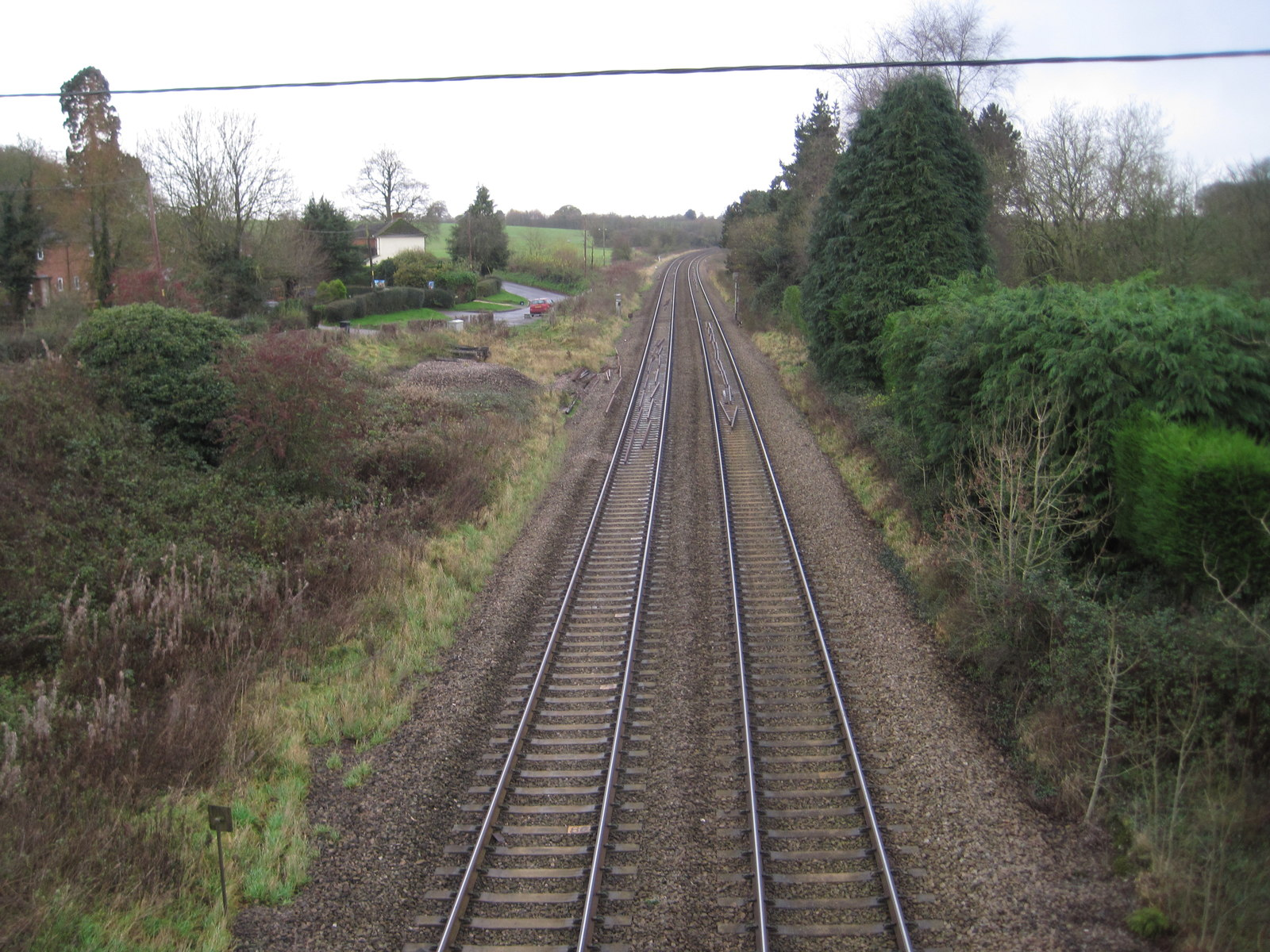
- The site of the station in 2015

General information
- Location: Wootton Rivers, Wiltshire; England
- Coordinates: 51.3638°N 1.7166°W
- Platforms: 2

Other information
- Status: Disused

History
- Original company: Great Western Railway
- Post-grouping: Great Western Railway

Key dates
- 24 September 1928: Opened
- 18 April 1966: Closed
Location

Wootton Rivers Halt railway station is a former railway station in Wootton Rivers, Wiltshire, England, on the Reading to Taunton line. The station opened in 1928 at the south end of the village, near the south bank of the Kennet and Avon Canal, and closed in 1966.

Preceding station	Historical railways	Following station
Savernake Low Level; Line open, station closed	Great Western Railway; Berks and Hants Railway	Pewsey; Line and station open
