= Brimslade House =

House in Wootton Rivers, Wiltshire, England

Coordinates: 51.3692°N 1.7003°W

Brimslade House is a former farmhouse in Brimslade, Wootton Rivers, Wiltshire, England.

The house is from the 16th or 17th century, with later additions. The ground floor is in brick while the upper floor is of timber-framed construction with tile cladding. In 1987 the house was designated as Grade II* listed.
