= Augustus Carp, Esq. =

1924 comic novel by Henry Howarth Bashford

First edition (publ. Houghton Mifflin)

Augustus Carp, Esq., By Himself: Being the Autobiography of a Really Good Man is a comic novel, originally anonymous, first published in the United Kingdom in May 1924 and, later that year, by Houghton Mifflin in the United States. The author was an English physician, Sir Henry Howarth Bashford (1880–1961), and the illustrations were by "Robin" (Marjorie Blood).

"Churchwarden, Sunday-school superintendent and President of the St Potamus Purity League, Augustus Carp Esquire is the unflinching opponent of Sin in all its manifestations. Glorious in his mediocrity, assiduous in exposing the faults of everyone he meets, resolute in the pursuit of goodness and his own advancement, the dimensions of his piety are matched only by his girth." (Penguin edition of 1987)

In his preface to a 1986 edition of the book (published as a postscript to the 1987 Penguin edition), Anthony Burgess wrote:

The book you have in your hands or hand or on your knee is one of the great comic novels of the twentieth century.

In the same edition of that book, Frank Muir wrote:

One of those little masterpieces that seems to pop up from nowhere: a sovereign cure for morbid thoughts and lack of lustre.

Kenneth Williams also enjoyed the book:

I had a great deal of trouble at the microphone when I read Augustus Carp for the BBC, caused by the need to stifle my laughter.

In his preface to the 1987 Penguin edition Robert Robinson wrote: "... the Carps are hugely unsympathetic, ... meanness and spite are elevated to operatic levels of booming humbug. It is part of the creative mystery that such a scenario should break the narrow bounds of what might simply have been based on a rather snooty view of lower-middle-class bigotry, and become a much less easily defined thing - a sort of fairy-tale."

== Adaptations ==
'Story Time' BBC Radio 4 FM. A ten-part adaptation read by Kenneth Williams, beginning Fri. 27th. July 1979, at 16:35. Producer: Pamela Howe, for BBC Radio Bristol.
