= Easton Royal =

Village in Wiltshire, England

Coordinates: 51.345°N 1.703°W

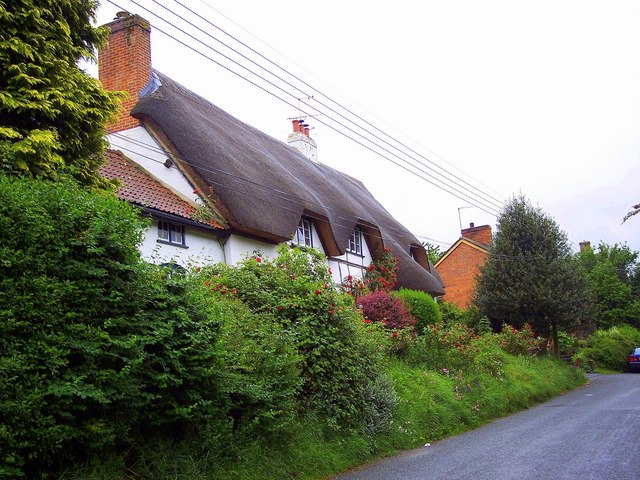
- Cottage, Easton Royal

- Location within Wiltshire
- Population: 253 (in 2011)
- OS grid reference: SU208607
- Civil parish: Easton
- Unitary authority: Wiltshire
- Ceremonial county: Wiltshire
- Region: South West
- Country: England
- Sovereign state: United Kingdom
- Post town: Pewsey
- Postcode district: SN9
- Dialling code: 01672
- Police: Wiltshire
- Fire: Dorset and Wiltshire
- Ambulance: South Western
- UK Parliament: East Wiltshire
- Website: Parish Council

Easton Royal is a village in the civil parish of Easton in Wiltshire, England, about 3 miles (5 km) east of Pewsey and 5 miles (8 km) south of Marlborough. The village was the location of Easton Priory from 1234 to 1536. The village mistakenly gained the Royal suffix in 1838 and the name Easton Royal has been in general use since the 1850s.

The parish is on the northeastern edge of Salisbury Plain, and near the eastern end of the Vale of Pewsey.

== History ==
Easton Hill, in the south of the parish, carries prehistoric sites including a bowl barrow and a disc barrow.

The village stands on or near the likely route of the Roman road between Mildenhall and Old Sarum. From the 13th century the village was on the Marlborough-Salisbury road, until the 17th century when the road took a more eastward course through Burbage. Easton Priory, begun in 1234, was built next to the road in order to aid travellers.

By 1833 the village had a small National School, which was replaced by a new building in 1874. A large hall was added to the school in 2005.

In 1836 the vicar of Great Bedwyn mistakenly described Easton's benefice as royal; in the 1850s the village began to be called Easton Royal, and this name came into common usage. The name of the parish remains Easton.

The population of the parish peaked in the mid 19th century, with 532 recorded at the 1841 census. By 1881 the population had declined to 323, and there was a further slow decline until the number stabilised around 250 by the middle of the 20th century.

== Religious sites ==
=== Early churches ===
Although Easton was not recorded in the Domesday Book of 1086, one of the two churches of the king's large estate at Wootton may have stood here. By the late 12th century the church may have belonged to the abbey at La Trinité-du-Mont, Upper Normandy; part of the patronage was later given to Bradenstoke Priory. A dispute followed, and was resolved by the bishop of Salisbury in a decision ratified in 1246 which granted the church to the priory that had been founded at Easton c. 1234. The church was enlarged with a north chapel in 1322 and by 1323 was dedicated to St Mary. In 1369 the church was demolished and material taken to enlarge the priory church, which became the parish church.

=== Holy Trinity ===
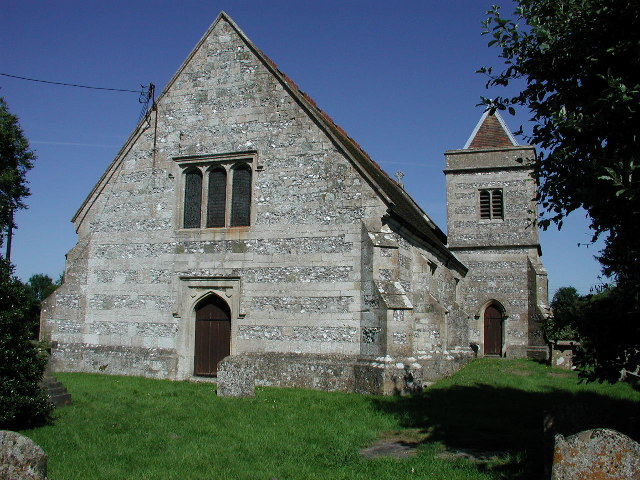
Holy Trinity Church

In 1536 St Mary's church was reported to be in poor condition, and in 1591 Sir Edward Seymour replaced it with a new Church of England parish church. By 1763 this church was dedicated to the Holy Trinity. The nave, font and porch survive from 1591; 19th-century restoration included work by T.H. Wyatt in 1852–3, when a south vestry was added with a tower above, and the body of the church was extended westward by one bay.

The church was designated as Grade II* listed in 1988. The benefice was united with Milton Lilbourne in 1929, and in 1991 with Pewsey and Wootton Rivers. Today the parish is part of the Vale of Pewsey team of churches.

== Local government ==
The civil parish of Easton elects a parish council. The parish is in the area of Wiltshire Council unitary authority, which is responsible for all significant local government functions.

== Amenities ==
The primary school continues on the same site, now called Easton Royal Academy. There is a village hall at Easton Royal. A pub, the Bruce Arms, is in the west of the parish, close to the boundary with Milton Lilbourne.

== Notable residents and benefactors ==
- Several Esturmys, hereditary wardens of Savernake forest since the Norman Conquest, funded and were buried at Easton church; their monuments were later (c. 1590) moved to Great Bedwyn when the original church fell into disrepair. Named, amongst others, on a stone plaque erected in the church in 1950.
- "Major" Sir John Wildman was captured here in 1655.
- Duchess of Somerset, 1672, perhaps Lady Frances Devereux, the wife of William Seymour, 2nd Duke of Somerset and mother of Henry Seymour, Lord Beauchamp and John Seymour, 4th Duke of Somerset.
- Edward Seymour of Easton, c. 1735 later Edward Seymour, 8th Duke of Somerset.
- Dr David Herbert Llewellyn, surgeon of the CSS Alabama, was the son of the vicar and is commemorated in the church. He lost his life when the Alabama was sunk by USS Kearsarge in 1864.
- Sir Henry Howarth Bashford (1880–1961) – historian of the village, who bequeathed land that is now the village recreation ground; commemorated by the village's first blue plaque at his former residence, the White House.
- Nigel Stock (actor)
