= Marlborough railway stations =

Former railway station in Wiltshire, England

Coordinates: 51.4162°N 1.7224°W

Marlborough High Level
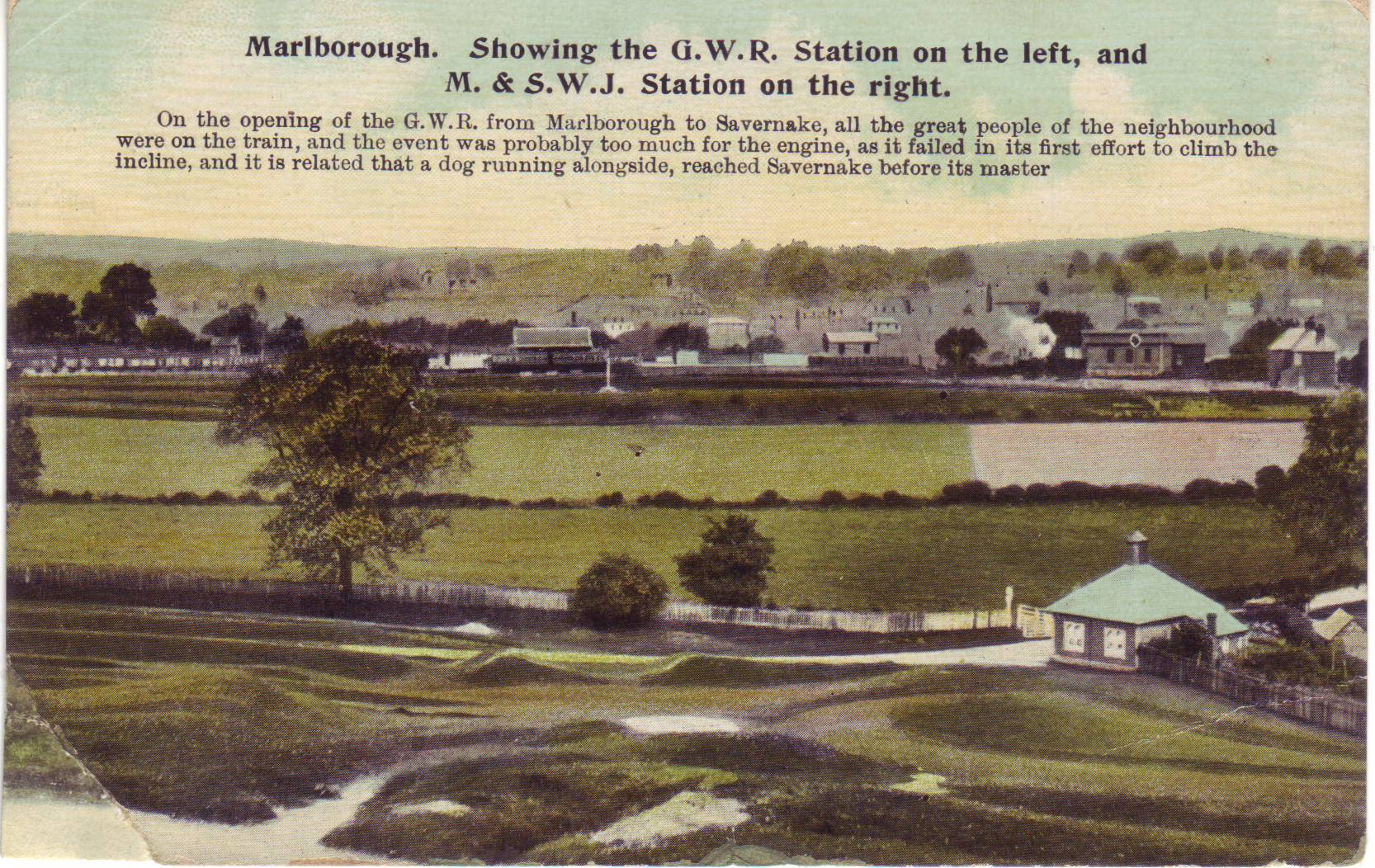
- Marlborough railway stations, early 1900s postcard

General information
- Location: Marlborough, Wiltshire; England

Other information
- Status: Disused

History
- Original company: Marlborough Railway
- Pre-grouping: Great Western Railway
- Post-grouping: Great Western Railway

Key dates
- 1864: Opened
- 1933: Closed for passengers
- 1964: Closed for goods
Location

Marlborough Low Level

General information
- Location: Marlborough, Wiltshire; England

Other information
- Status: Disused

History
- Original company: Swindon, Marlborough and Andover Railway
- Pre-grouping: Midland and South Western Junction Railway
- Post-grouping: Great Western Railway

Key dates
- 1881: Opened
- 1961: Closed for passengers
- 1964: Closed for goods
Location

Marlborough railway stations refers to the two railway stations which served Marlborough, Wiltshire, England, until 1964.

The stations were on separate routes. A branch line was built by an independent railway friendly to the Great Western Railway (GWR) from Savernake to Marlborough in 1864. A north–south railway, later to be part of a long-distance trunk route, opened from Swindon to its station at Marlborough in 1881, extending south to Andover in 1881. The two routes came under the same management at the "Grouping" of the railways in 1923 and some rationalisation took place. Passenger services to Marlborough were withdrawn in 1961 and goods services in 1964.

== The Great Western Railway Branch ==
=== Marlborough Railway ===
On 11 November 1862, the Berks and Hants Extension Railway (B&HER) opened a broad gauge railway line from Hungerford, itself originally the terminus of a branch line from Reading, to Devizes. At Devizes the new line linked up with the Wilts, Somerset and Weymouth Railway branch line from Trowbridge which had opened in 1857. The line was worked by the larger Great Western Railway (GWR).

Marlborough Railway Act 1861
- Act of Parliament
- Parliament of the United Kingdom
- Long title: An Act to authorize the Construction of a Railway from the Berks and Hants Extension Railway to Marlborough in Wiltshire.
- Citation: 24 & 25 Vict. c. clxvii

Dates
- Royal assent: 22 July 1861

Although Marlborough was an important market town, the new B&HER main line passed some distance to the south, near the village of Burbage. Local businessmen promoted an independent branch line, the Marlborough Railway, to connect their town to the Savernake station of the B&HER, north of Burbage. It was authorised by the Marlborough Railway Act 1861 (24 & 25 Vict. c. clxvii) and opened on 15 April 1864; it was 5 miles 49 chains (9.0 km) in length, and built using the broad gauge. There were no intermediate stations, and trains departed from a new platform at Savernake.

This line too was worked by the GWR, and the B&HER and the Marlborough Railway were absorbed by the Great Western Railway in 1886; the Marlborough Railway was purchased for £9,250 in cash. Both lines were converted to standard gauge in 1874.

=== Marlborough GWR station ===
The GWR station in Marlborough was to the south-east of the town centre, on the west side of Salisbury Road; it had a substantial L-shaped red brick building with waiting rooms for both first-class and ordinary passengers. It had a single platform, and goods facilities were provided at the northern end. There was also a separate goods yard to the south of the station and an engine shed to the north-east near the buffer stops.

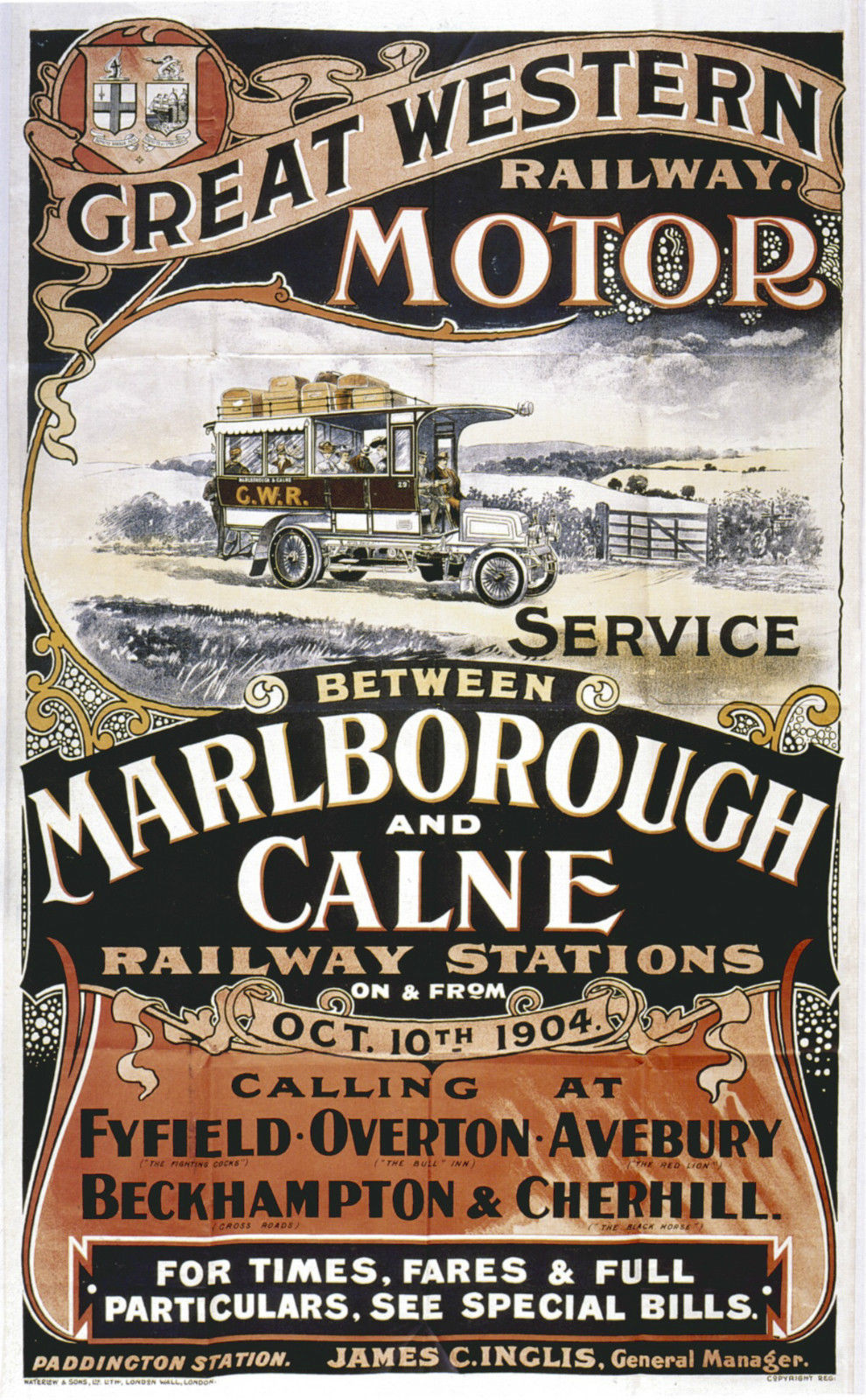
Poster for road motor service to Calne, 1904

Marlborough GWR station became the focus for road traffic in the area, with horse buses at first along the Bath road; motor buses were introduced in 1904. Many of the bus services were operated by the GWR.

== The Midland and South Western Junction Railway ==
=== The Swindon, Marlborough and Andover Railway ===
Original plans for railways in the Marlborough area had focused on a scheme for a north–south line to link Swindon with Andover, passing through Marlborough. Though the GWR branch line got to Marlborough first, the north–south plans were revived with an Act in 1873, and the Swindon, Marlborough and Andover Railway was built in two halves. The northern section, from Swindon Town south to Marlborough, was opened in July 1881; the southern section, from Andover Junction north to Grafton and Burbage, opened the following year, 1882.

The new Marlborough station opened as a terminus just to the east of the existing GWR station. It had a station building on the up platform (towards Swindon) with a huge canopy. There was a goods yard behind the up platform to the north-west of the passenger station, with a large goods shed.

=== Links to the GWR ===
Having built its lines from the north and the south, the financially strapped SM&AR then found that it could not join them, being unable to afford to persuade landowners to sell their property to build the missing link. Instead, it built a short link within Marlborough to the GWR branch line just south of Marlborough GWR station and another link from the GWR's Berks and Hants Extension Railway just east of Savernake station southwards to Grafton and Burbage station. From February 1883, SM&AR through trains used the GWR Marlborough branch and a short section of the B&HER main line, including Savernake station. A condition of the GWR lease was that passengers wanting to change at Savernake to other GWR services had to use the GWR trains from Marlborough.

=== The Swindon and Cheltenham Extension Railway ===
In 1884, the SM&AR combined with the Swindon and Cheltenham Extension Railway, which ran northwards from Swindon Town, first to Cirencester and then, from 1891, into Cheltenham Lansdown. The combined line was called the Midland and South Western Junction Railway (M&SWJR) and with its links northwards from Cheltenham to the Midlands and southwards from Andover over the Sprat and Winkle Line to the south coast ports it became a true through line.

=== The Marlborough and Grafton Railway ===
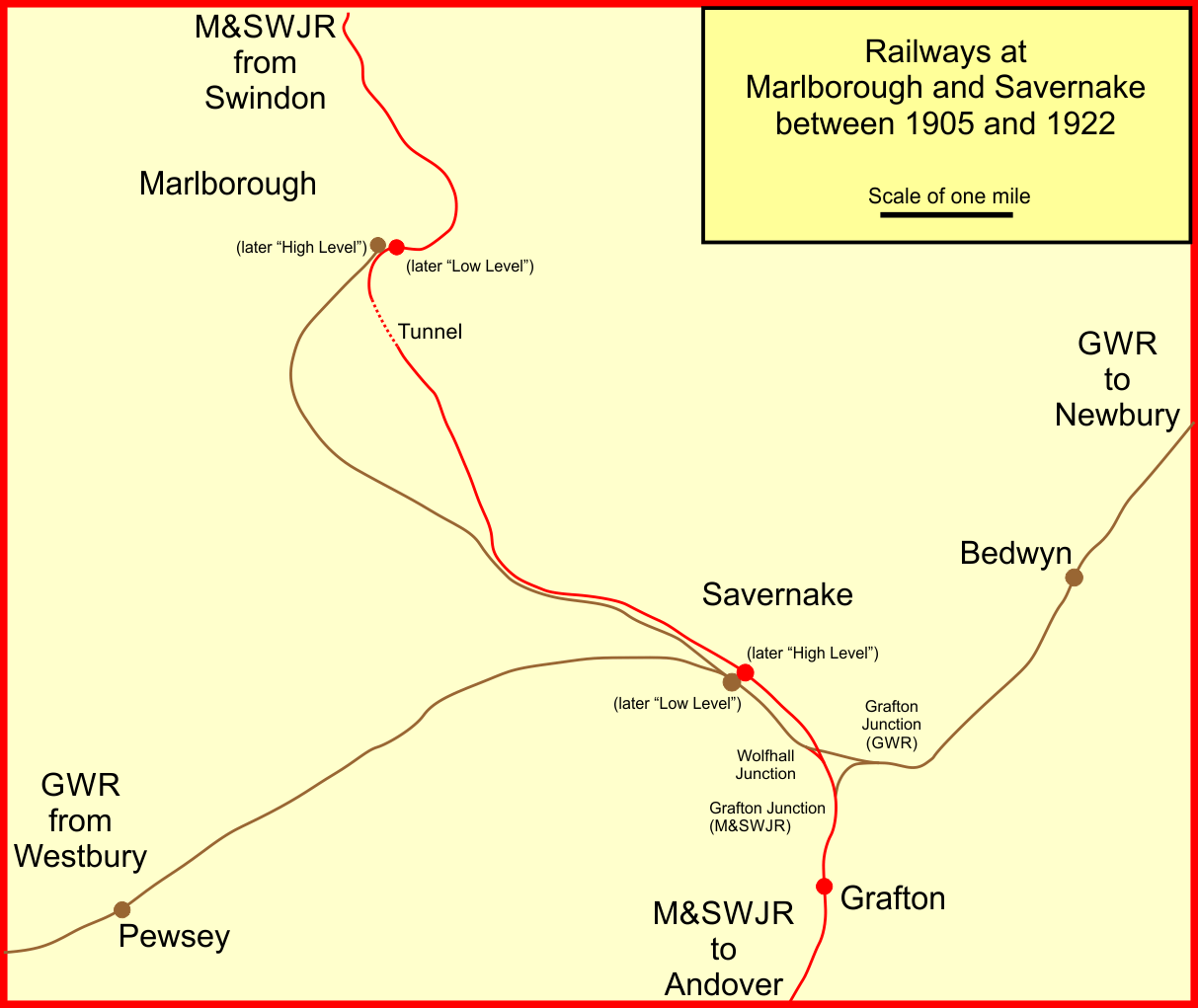
Marlborough and Savernake lines in 1922

With the northern extension to Cheltenham complete, the M&SWJR turned its attention in the early 1890s to resolving its problem at Marlborough, where it was paying £1,000 a year to run over the GWR Marlborough branch tracks. The company negotiated successfully with the Marquess of Ailesbury to run a new line from the M&SWJR station in Marlborough, through a 640-yard tunnel and across Savernake Forest. The new section then crossed the GWR's Berks and Hants Extension line and joined the southern section of the original SM&AR line just north of Grafton and Burbage station.

The new double-track section was called the Marlborough and Grafton Railway and was given parliamentary approval in 1893. It opened for through traffic on 26 June 1898, at which point the link just outside Marlborough station to the GWR branch line was closed. The only intermediate station on the new section was at Savernake, about 200 yards from the GWR Savernake station but not connected to it.

The Marlborough and Grafton Railway was formally taken over by the M&SWJR in 1899, and for the next quarter century Marlborough had regular services on both lines. The April 1910 timetable, for example, shows each line offering about eight services a day, though the GWR did not run trains on Sundays.

== Rationalisation after the Grouping ==
=== Station renaming ===
The Railways Act 1921 grouped most of the railways in mainland Great Britain into four large companies, and the Midland and South Western Junction Railway was incorporated into the Great Western Railway, its rival for the rail traffic at Marlborough. For a few years, the GWR did nothing to rationalise the anomaly of having two parallel lines running into the town, but it did rename the stations. Confusingly the former GWR stations were named Marlborough High Level and Savernake Low Level, while the former M&SWJR stations were renamed as Marlborough Low Level and Savernake High Level.

=== 1926 link ===
In 1926, the GWR reopened the 1883 link between the two lines just outside the two Marlborough stations, enabling trains from the main line junction at Savernake Low Level to pass through Marlborough on to the north.

=== 1933 link ===
Further changes came in 1933. The GWR built a second link between its original branch line and the M&SWJR line much nearer Savernake and closed the original branch and station in Marlborough to passenger traffic. The goods yard at Marlborough GWR station was retained, but was accessed from the north through the Marlborough M&SWJR station using the link that had been restored in 1926.

All passenger services were rerouted to the M&SWJR station at Marlborough. The GWR chose to operate the double track M&SWJR line as two separate single track lines: the former up line (towards Swindon) was used for the branch services from Savernake Low Level while the through north–south services which passed through Savernake High Level all ran on the former down line. This odd arrangement persisted into British Railways days.

== Decline and closure ==
=== World War II ===
The Midland and South Western Junction line was very heavily used for troop and other military movements across Salisbury Plain in the Second World War, but after the war both passenger and goods traffic declined sharply in competition with road transport. Marlborough, about midway between London and Bath/Bristol, had become a focus for long-distance east–west bus services and the railway found it difficult to compete.

=== Closure ===
The whole line closed for passenger services in 1961, including the remaining branch line service from Savernake Low Level. Before the closure, there had been one last twist in the intertwined history of the two lines and the various stations. In September 1958, a landslip blocked the main line close to Savernake High Level station. Through services were diverted back through Savernake Low Level, as they had been from 1883 to 1898, but this time using the later 1933 link between the lines, and Savernake High Level station closed. This arrangement, however, lasted only three years until passenger services were withdrawn.

Goods traffic continued to Marlborough from Savernake for a further three years, with the GWR station's goods yard remaining open until May 1964 and the M&SWJR station's goods facilities holding on until September 1964. There were occasional passenger services too in this period, associated with Marlborough College excursions.

=== The sites today ===
Both Marlborough stations have disappeared beneath new developments in the town.

== Routes ==
=== Marlborough High Level ===
Preceding station	Disused railways	Following station
Terminus	Great Western Railway; Marlborough Railway	Savernake Low Level; 1864-1933

=== Marlborough Low Level ===
Preceding station	Disused railways	Following station
Ogbourne; 1881-1961	Midland and South Western Junction Railway; Swindon, Marlborough and Andover Railway	Savernake High Level; 1898-1958
Ogbourne; 1881-1961	Midland and South Western Junction Railway; Swindon, Marlborough and Andover Railway	Savernake Low Level; 1883-1898,1958-1961
Terminus	Great Western Railway; Marlborough Railway	Savernake Low Level; 1933-1958
