= Burbage, Wiltshire =

Village in Wiltshire, England

Coordinates: 51.349°N 1.671°W

Burbage
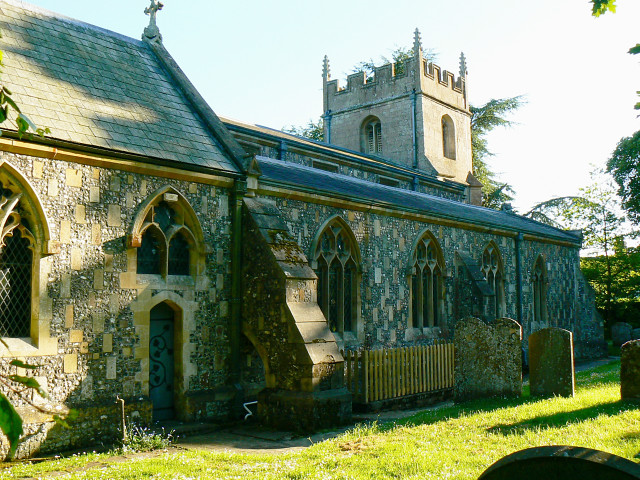
- All Saints' church, Burbage

- Location within Wiltshire
- Population: 1,772 (in 2011)
- OS grid reference: SU2361
- Civil parish: Burbage
- Unitary authority: Wiltshire
- Ceremonial county: Wiltshire
- Region: South West
- Country: England
- Sovereign state: United Kingdom
- Post town: Marlborough
- Postcode district: SN8
- Dialling code: 01672
- Police: Wiltshire
- Fire: Dorset and Wiltshire
- Ambulance: South Western
- UK Parliament: East Wiltshire
- Website: Parish Council

Burbage is a village and civil parish in the Vale of Pewsey, Wiltshire, England. It is about 6 miles (9.7 km) south of Marlborough and 20 miles (32 km) west of Newbury.

The parish includes the hamlets of Durley, Eastcourt, Marr Green, Ram Alley, Stibb Green, The Warren (which is close to Tottenham House), and Westcourt.

== Local government ==
Burbage is a civil parish with an elected parish council. It is in the area of Wiltshire Council unitary authority. Both councils are responsible for different aspects of local government.

== Geography ==
Burbage stands on a watershed at the eastern end of the Vale of Pewsey, with streams to the east draining to the Thames via the Dun and Kennet; to the south draining to the Salisbury Avon via the River Bourne; and to the north and west direct to the Avon.

The village High Street was the main north–south road from Marlborough to Andover, now the A346 primary route, until a bypass was built to the west in 1991. A more minor route from Pewsey to Hungerford and the M4 (designated A338 to the east and B3087 to the west) passes to the south of the village. Burbage no longer has a station on the nearby Reading to Taunton line, the nearest stations being at Great Bedwyn (which has commuter services to London) and Pewsey.

Burbage lies in the heart of the North Wessex Downs, a designated Area of Outstanding Natural Beauty.

== History ==
The name Burbage derives from the Old English burh bæc meaning 'fortification by a stream', or 'fortification by a ridge'.

The 1086 Domesday survey recorded a church, four landholders and 15 households, and a further eight households at the settlement later known as Wulfhall or Wolfhall, about three-quarters of a mile to the east. In the 16th century, Wulfhall was the seat of the Seymour family; among them Jane Seymour, who was queen to Henry VIII. The Seymour manor house was demolished in 1723 and replaced by a larger house nearby. Wulfhall was anciently a tithing of Great Bedwyn parish and was transferred to Burbage parish in the late 19th century.

The Kennet and Avon Canal, completed in 1810, crosses the parish just north of the village, where it passes through the Bruce Tunnel. Burbage Wharf was further west, where the canal passes under the present-day A346.

The Great Western Railway's Berks and Hants Extension Railway from Hungerford to Devizes was built close to the canal in the 1860s, eventually becoming part of the Reading to Plymouth section of the main line from London Paddington in 1906. The GWR built Savernake Low Level north of the village, above the canal tunnel; British Railways closed it in 1966 but the line remains in use. Until 1947 there was also a goods-only station at Burbage Wharf.

The Midland and South Western Junction Railway opened from Andover to Grafton and Burbage in 1882, the latter station being situated in nearby West Grafton. The northern section of the M&SWJR line from Swindon to Marlborough Low Level had opened in 1881, and this was joined to the southern section from 1883 by using the Great Western Railway's branch between Savernake and Marlborough High Level. In 1898 the M&SWJR got its own route between Marlborough and Grafton and a new station opened at Savernake High Level. The M&SWJR had therefore become a route between Southampton Central and Cheltenham and the Midlands. British Railways closed it in 1961.

The population of Burbage peaked at around 1600 with the building of the railway in 1860, declining to a low point of 1000 a century later. It has since increased steadily, regaining its 1860s level in the 21st century.

The first school in the village was built at Eastcourt in 1806, rebuilt in 1856 and supplemented by a separate building for younger children in 1861. This school was taken over by the county council around 1906, and educated children of all ages until Marlborough secondary school opened in 1946. The 19th-century buildings (designated Grade II listed in 1988) were closed in 1989 upon the opening of the new school, and became a private residence.

== Church and chapel ==
The Church of England parish church of All Saints was rebuilt in 1854 by T.H. Wyatt, then extended with a south aisle in 1876. The original church was from the 12th century and was rebuilt in the 14th and 15th, when the tower was added; the porch was added in the 16th. The present church retains only the tower and porch of the earlier building, and is Grade II* listed. The church is now part of the Savernake team ministry.

A small Wesleyan Methodist chapel was built at Eastcourt in 1822, and replaced by a larger building on the High Street in 1906. This closed in 1996 and is now a private house.

== Amenities ==
Burbage Primary School serves the village and surrounding area. The school was built in 1989 on a centrally located site, between the High Street and Eastcourt.

Burbage has a village hall and a cricket club, Burbage and Easton Royal CC, who play in the Wiltshire division of the West of England Premier League.

There is one pub: the White Hart, on the High Street in the centre of the village.
