= Clench, Wiltshire =

Hamlet in Wiltshire, England

Coordinates: 51.365°N 1.733°W

Clench
- Location within Wiltshire
- OS grid reference: SU187629
- Civil parish: Milton Lilbourne
- Unitary authority: Wiltshire
- Ceremonial county: Wiltshire
- Region: South West
- Country: England
- Sovereign state: United Kingdom
- Post town: MARLBOROUGH
- Postcode district: SN8
- Police: Wiltshire
- Fire: Dorset and Wiltshire
- Ambulance: South Western
- UK Parliament: East Wiltshire

Clench is a hamlet in Wiltshire, England, in the Vale of Pewsey to the west of Wootton Rivers. It is in the civil parish of Milton Lilbourne. Its nearest town is Marlborough, approximately 3.8 miles (6.1 km) north from the hamlet.

The name Clench dates from the 13th century and means a lumpy or massive hill. During the 15th century, Clench probably extended further south, perhaps as far as the complex of small closes near Broomsgrove Lodge, with more buildings and boundaries than survive now, as the area was marked as 'Clinch' on the 1843 title map.

The timber-framed Brewers Cottage House dates from the late 17th or early 18th century and is designated as a Grade II listed building. It is now divided into two cottages.
