= Easton Priory =

Catholic priory of the Trinitarian Order in Wiltshire

Easton Priory was a Catholic priory of the Trinitarian Order in Wiltshire, England from 1234 to 1536.

== History ==
The priory was built in 1234 A.D. on the southern end of a street village along the road between Marlborough and Salisbury. (The village would later become Easton Royal in the 1850s.) The building was rebuilt following a fire in 1493. Use of the priory was dissolved in 1536 during the English Reformation. According to historians, after dissolution, the priory probably served as the house of John Barwick, the receiver of Edward Seymour, 1st Duke of Somerset, and his family members until 1580. The buildings were demolished ca. 1591.
