= Henry Howarth Bashford =

English physician and author

Sir Henry Howarth Bashford FRCP
- Sir Henry Howarth Bashford
- Born: 13 January 1880; Kensington, London, England
- Died: 15 August 1961 (aged 81); Easton Royal, Wiltshire, England
- Education: Bedford Modern School
- Alma mater: University of London
- Occupation: Physician
- Known for: Honorary Physician to George VI (1941–44); Author

Sir Henry Howarth Bashford FRCP (13 January 1880 – 15 August 1961) was a distinguished English physician, becoming Honorary Physician to King George VI. He was also an author, most notably of satirical novels.

== Early life ==
Bashford was born in Kensington, London on 13 January 1880 the son of Frederick Bashford and Henrietta Eleanor, daughter of the Rev. Henry Howarth, Rector of St George's, Hanover Square and Chaplain in Ordinary to Queen Victoria. On his paternal side, his grandfather Lt. J. Bashford (later Captain), Royal Navy, was mentioned in the official list of the wounded at the Battle of Trafalgar in which he took part on board HMS Royal Sovereign.

Bashford was educated at Bedford Modern School, the University of London and the London Hospital.

== Career ==
Bashford was Chief Medical Officer to the Post Office (1933–43) and subsequently Treasury Medical Adviser (1943–45). He was Honorary Physician to King George VI (1941–44) and was the late Honorary President of the Post Office Ambulance Centre, St. John Ambulance Association. He was created a knight-bachelor of the Order of St. John of Jerusalem, announced in the King’s birthday honours on 9 June 1938.

== Writing ==
Bashford is now remembered as a writer, in particular of the satirical Augustus Carp, Esq., By Himself: Being the Autobiography of a Really Good Man (1924), which was first published anonymously. He also wrote some popular poetry.

== Family life ==
In 1908 Bashford married Margaret Eveline, daughter of Ernest Sutton of Basildon, Berkshire. They had one son and three daughters. Bashford died in Easton Royal on 15 August 1961, where he was awarded a blue plaque.

The National Portrait Gallery has a photographic bromide print portrait of Sir Henry.

== Works ==
- Tommy Wideawake (1903)
- The Manitoban: A Romance (1904)
- The Pilgrims' March (1909)
- The corner of Harley Street: being some familiar correspondence of Peter Harding, M.D. (1911)
- Vagabonds In Périgord (1914)
- Pity the poor blind (1917)
- Sons Of Admiralty: A Short History Of The Naval War 1914-1918 with Archibald Hurd (1919)
- The Heroic Record of the British Navy with A. Hurd (1920)
- Half-Past Bedtime (1922)
- Augustus Carp, Esq., By Himself: Being the Autobiography of a Really Good Man (1924)
- The Happy Ghost and Other Stories (1925)
- Behind The Fog (1927)
- The Harley Street Calendar (1929)
- The Student Life And Other Essays (Intro to work by William Ostler) (1931)
- The Man On Ben Na Garve [Short story in The Second Century Of Detective Stories Ed EC Bentley] (1938)
- Doctors In Shirt Sleeves (1940)
- Fisherman's Progress (1946)
- Wiltshire Harvest (1953)
- Easton Royal: A Short History
- Lodgings For Twelve
- The Plain Girl's Tale
- Songs Out Of School

He also wrote as Peter Harding.
