= Hungerford railway station =

Railway station in Berkshire, England

Hungerford
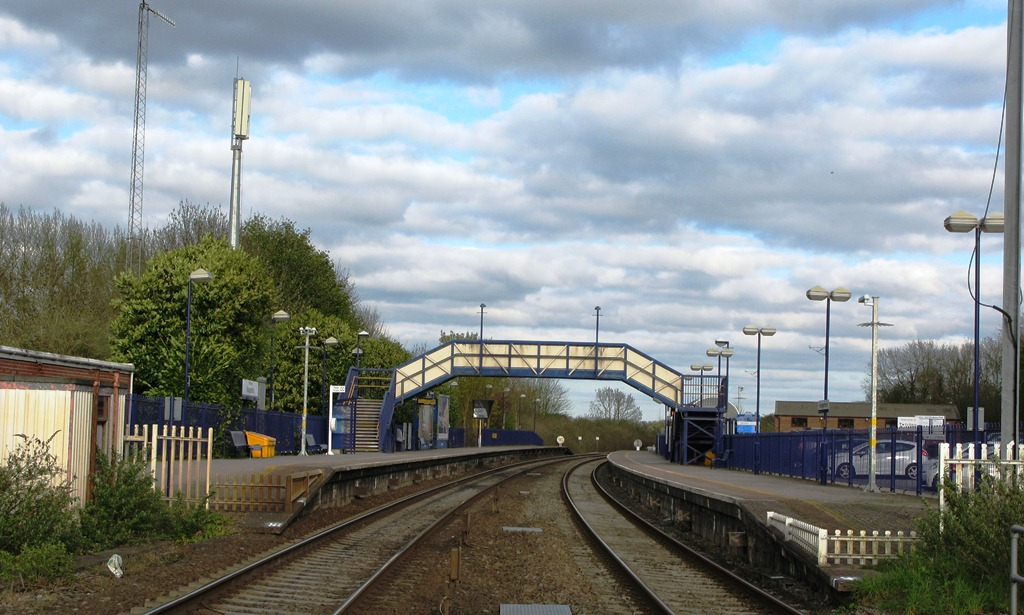

General information
- Location: Hungerford, West Berkshire, England
- Coordinates: 51.415°N 1.512°W
- Grid reference: SU340685
- Manager: Great Western Railway
- Platforms: 2

Other information
- Station code: HGD
- Classification: DfT category F1

History
- Opened: December 1847

Passengers
- 2021/22: ▲0.186 million
- 2022/23: ▲0.230 million
- 2023/24: ▲0.288 million
- 2024/25: ▲0.312 million
- 2025/26: ▲0.372 million
Location
Notes
- Passenger statistics from the Office of Rail and Road

Hungerford railway station serves the historic market town of Hungerford, in Berkshire, England. It lies 61 miles 43 chains (61.5 mi; 99.0 km) down the line from London Paddington. The station is managed by Great Western Railway, which also operates all trains serving it.

== History ==
The Great Western Railway (GWR) opened the station in 1847, as a temporary terminus of the Berks and Hants Line which started at Reading General. In 1862, the Berks and Hants was extended to Patney and Chirton, eventually reaching Taunton on 2 April 1906; this allowed the running of express trains from London Paddington through to the South West without taking the longer route through Bristol Temple Meads.

The station ceased to deal with goods traffic in 1970 and became an unstaffed halt with subsequent demolition of the station buildings in 1971, except the 1902 footbridge over the lines. The footbridge was replaced by the current modern structure in 1999.

A freight train crashed at the station on 10 November 1971, partially demolishing the GWR signal box, which was then replaced by a modern wooden flat roofed signal box; this served until the end of semaphore signalling and the introduction of colour light signals on 17 July 1978.

== Services ==
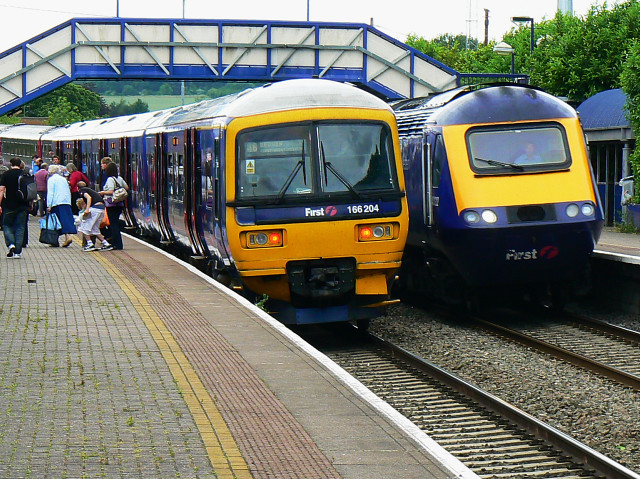
Trains at Hungerford station, 2009

Great Western Railway operates the following general weekday services, in trains per hour (tph):

- 1 tph to Newbury
- 1 tph to Bedwyn
- 12 tpd to London Paddington, in an irregular pattern
- 2 tpd to Exeter St Davids
- 1 tpd to Frome
- 1 tpd to Westbury.

Services at the station were disrupted throughout 2021 due to cracks found in the Intercity Express Trains, causing the loss of the regular direct service to London which it previously had; however, there are some direct services in peak times. Since then, there has been a diesel multiple unit shuttle service between Newbury and Bedwyn; five years later, despite the cracks being resolved and continued complaints, this service is still in operation.

Preceding station	National Rail	Following station
Newbury	Great Western Railway; Semi-fast services Reading-Taunton line	Pewsey
Kintbury	Great Western Railway; Newbury to Bedwyn; Local services Reading-Taunton line	Bedwyn
