= Bedwyn railway station =

Railway station in the village of Great Bedwyn, Wiltshire, England

Bedwyn
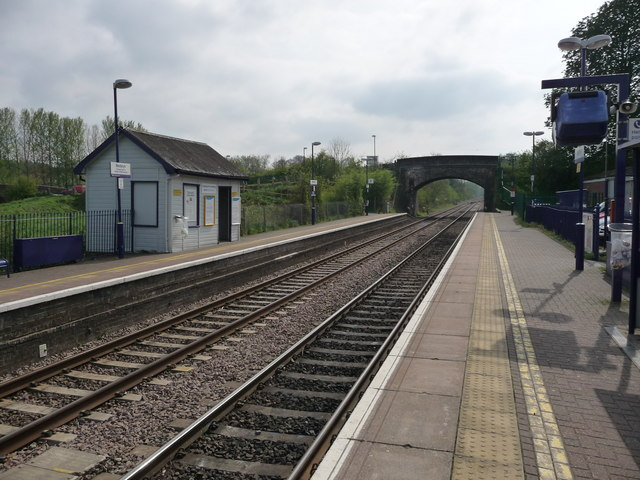

General information
- Location: Great Bedwyn, Wiltshire; England
- Coordinates: 51.380°N 1.599°W
- Grid reference: SU279645
- Manager: Great Western Railway
- Platforms: 2

Other information
- Station code: BDW
- Classification: DfT category F1

History
- Opened: 1862

Passengers
- 2020/21: ▼20,398
- 2021/22: ▲74,180
- 2022/23: ▲81,534
- 2023/24: ▲93,570
- 2024/25: ▲99,948
Location
Notes
- Passenger statistics from the Office of Rail and Road

Bedwyn railway station serves the village of Great Bedwyn in Wiltshire, England. It is 66 miles 33 chains (66.41 mi; 106.9 km) from the zero point at London Paddington. Along with Pewsey station, it serves the market town of Marlborough which is 6 miles (10 km) away. It is sited between Pewsey to the west (although only a few trains call at both stations) and Hungerford to the east.

== History ==
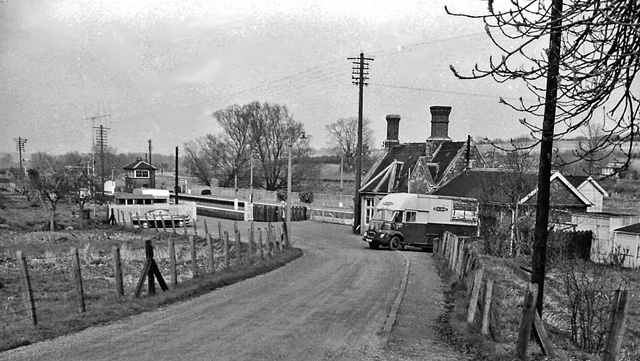
Station approach in 1963

Bedwyn station was opened on 11 November 1862 by the Great Western Railway company as part of the Berks and Hants Railway from Hungerford to Devizes; the line continues in use as part of the Reading to Taunton Line. In 1900 the Stert and Westbury Railway allowed Devizes to be bypassed, and Westbury became the next major station west of Bedwyn.

In 1905, to cater for traffic for army camps on Salisbury Plain, the line west of Bedwyn was linked (via the Grafton Curve and a bridge over the Kennet and Avon Canal) to Grafton and Burbage on the north-south Swindon, Marlborough and Andover Railway. This line was closed in 1961.

Between 2 November 1964 and 5 May 1969, it was known as Bedwyn Halt.

== Facilities ==
The station has basic facilities including a bus-type shelter on both sides, a ticket machine, help points and information screens. The only crossing between platforms is via the road bridge over the railway.

== Passenger volume ==
Passenger volume at Bedwyn
	2004–05	2005–06	2006–07	2007–08	2008–09	2009–10	2010–11	2011–12	2012–13	2013–14	2014–15	2015–16	2016–17	2017–18	2018–19	2019–20	2020–21	2021–22	2022–23	2023–24	2024–25
Entries and exits	78,439	74,773	77,048	81,160	83,718	83,492	94,584	106,702	119,352	111,512	115,808	121,700	120,534	116,310	109,320	129,886	20,398	74,180	81,534	93,570	99,948

The statistics cover twelve month periods that start in April.

== Services ==
The station is served by local services operated by Great Western Railway between here and Newbury. A crossover and siding at the west of the station allow services to reverse and lay over before returning east. Great Western Railway operates British Rail Class 165 Networker Turbo and British Rail Class 802 IET at this station.

The station is also served by a limited number of services that continue west of here, reaching Westbury, Taunton, Exeter St Davids and beyond.

Services at the station were disrupted throughout 2021 due to cracks found in the Intercity Express Trains, causing the loss of the direct service to London which it previously had (although there are some direct services in peak times). Since 2021, there has been a diesel shuttle to Newbury; 5 years later, despite the cracks being resolved and continued complaints, this service is still in operation. Rail magazine reported GWR's position on the matter, saying

The [Bedwyn Trains] passenger group has been in regular contact with GWR, which has told customers it does not know when regular Bedwyn services might be restored. The operator has said it would not be possible to restore even one of the train sets used on the route, which would enable one third of through services. It also told the passenger group that it would not be possible for trains serving nearby Pewsey to make additional stops.

Preceding station	National Rail	Following station
Hungerford	Great Western Railway; Newbury to Bedwyn; Local Services; Reading – Taunton line	Terminus
Hungerford	Great Western Railway; Limited service Reading – Taunton Line	Pewsey
	Historical railways	
Hungerford; Line and station open	Great Western Railway; Berks and Hants Extension Railway	Savernake Low Level; Line open, station closed
	Disused railways	
Grafton and Burbage	Midland and South Western Junction Railway	Savernake Low Level

== Bibliography ==
- Quick, Michael (2023). Railway Passenger Stations in Great Britain: A Chronology (PDF) (5th ed.). London: Railway and Canal Historical Society.
