= Reading–Taunton line =

Major branch of the Great Western Main Line

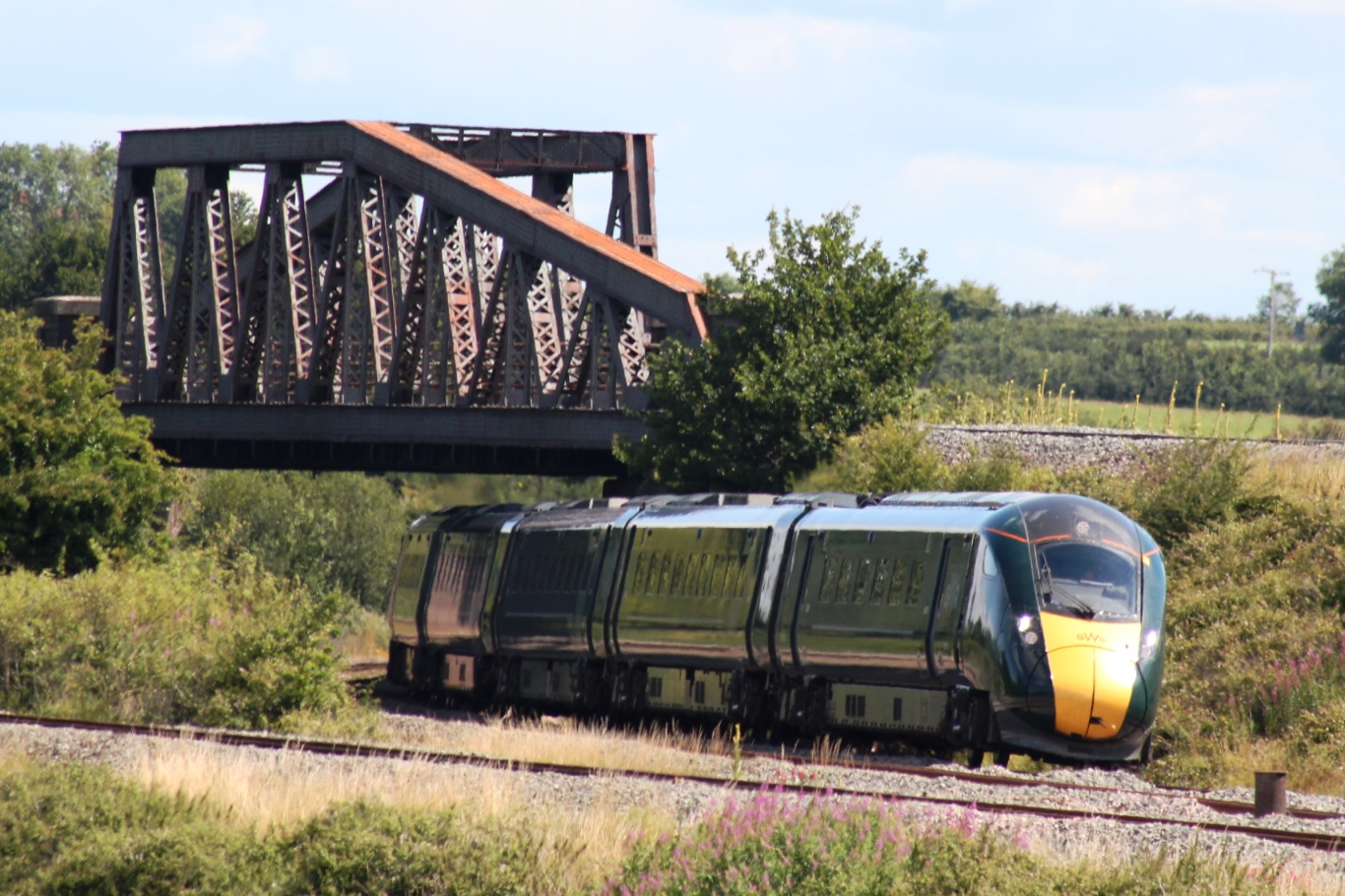
- A Class 802 of Great Western Railway at Cogload Junction

Overview
- Status: Operational
- Owner: Network Rail
- Locale: South East England; South West England
- Termini: Reading; Taunton

Service
- Type: Heavy rail
- System: National Rail
- Operator(s): Great Western Railway

History
- Opened: 1906; 120 years ago

Technical
- Line length: 103 mi 51 ch (166.8 km)
- Number of tracks: 2
- Track gauge: 1,435 mm (4 ft 8 1/2 in) standard gauge
- Electrification: 25 kV 50 hz AC OLE (Reading to Newbury)
- Operating speed: 110 mph (180 km/h) maximum
Route map
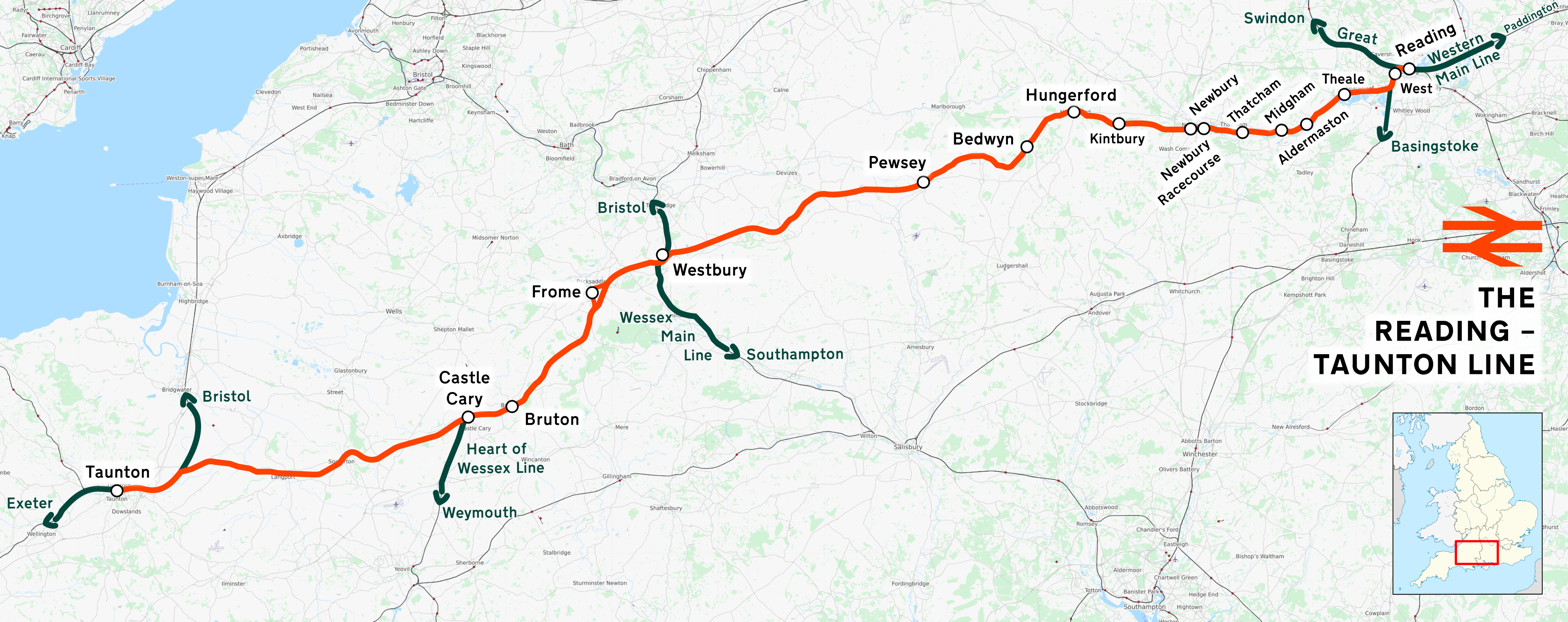
(Click to expand)

The Reading–Taunton line is a major branch of the Great Western Main Line from which it diverges at Reading railway station. It runs to Cogload Junction (east of Taunton) where it joins the Bristol to Exeter and Penzance line.

Since 1906 it has served as the principal route from London Paddington to Devon and Cornwall, having been built by the Great Western Railway (GWR) joining up several earlier railway lines. These included the Berks and Hants Railway from Reading to Hungerford and part of the Wilts, Somerset and Weymouth Railway from Westbury to Castle Cary. The section from Reading to Westbury is sometimes called the Berks and Hants Line, despite never entering the county of Hampshire.

== History ==
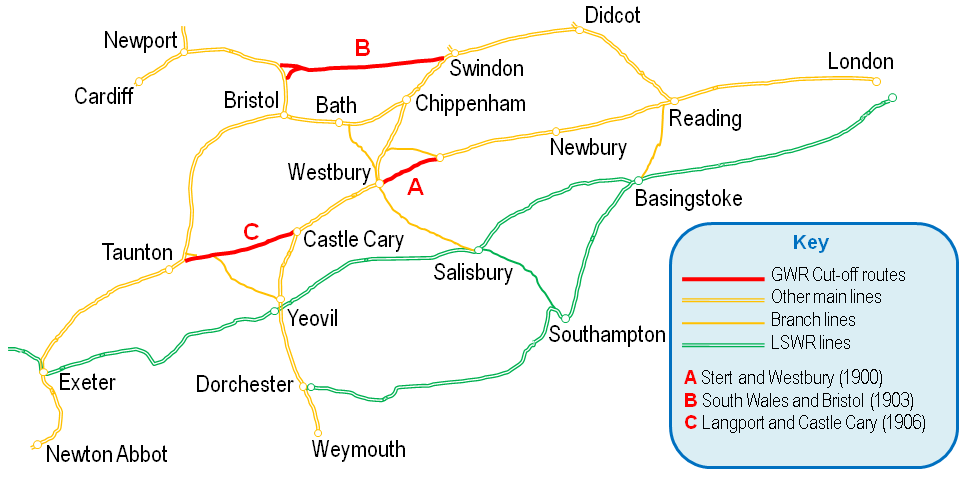
The GWR's cut-off lines to the west of England (shown in red).

The Great Western Railway first ran trains from London to Plymouth in 1848. These trains ran via Bristol. The London and South Western Railway completed the rival West of England line in 1860, which provided a more direct route from London to Exeter. The GWR's longer route via Bristol became nicknamed the "Great Way Round" (after its initials GWR).

The direct line from Reading to Taunton was created from three earlier routes. These had been created by companies that had been absorbed into the GWR:

- The Berks and Hants Railway's route between Reading and Pewsey, which was part of a route that was extended west to Devizes and Trowbridge. The line was opened as a branch to Hungerford in 1847, then extended west in 1862.
- The Wilts, Somerset and Weymouth Railway's route between Westbury and Castle Cary, which was part of a route from Chippenham to Weymouth. These sections opened in stages from 1848 to 1856.
- The Bristol and Exeter Railway's route between Langport and Taunton, which was part of the branch to Yeovil they had opened in 1853.

The first step of creating the direct line was in 1900 when the Stert and Westbury Railway was built from Patney and Chirton (west of Pewsey) to Westbury. In addition to being part of creating a long-distance line from Reading to Taunton, it also created a shorter GWR route from London to Weymouth. The last stage to be built was the Langport and Castle Cary Railway from Castle Cary to Taunton. This route shared some of the route of the Yeovil–Taunton line west of Langport, but joined the existing main line further south at Cogload Junction. This route opened on 2 July 1906.

The various sections of line were opened:

- Reading to Hungerford – 21 December 1847
- Hungerford to Patney and Chirton – 11 November 1862
- Patney & Chirton to Westbury, Wiltshire – 29 July 1900 (the Stert and Westbury Railway)
- Westbury to Frome, Somerset – 7 October 1850
- Frome to Castle Cary – 1 September 1856
- Castle Cary to Charlton Mackrell – 2 July 1905
- Charlton Mackrell to Somerton – 20 May 1906 goods trains, 2 July 1906 passenger trains
- Somerton to Curry Rivel Junction – 12 February 1906 goods trains, 2 July 1906 passenger trains
- Curry Rivel Junction to Athelney Junction – 1 October 1853 as part of Taunton to Yeovil line
- Athelney Junction to Cogload Junction – 2 April 1906
- Cogload Junction to Taunton – 1 June 1842

In 1933, bypass lines were built at Westbury and Frome.

The Great Western was nationalised on 1 January 1948 as part of the new British Railways (BR). Resignalling in the 1980s enabled faster running. This was followed by privatisation in the 1990s, with the line being transferred first to Railtrack and then to its successor Network Rail.

In 1977 the Parliamentary Select Committee on Nationalised Industries recommended considering electrification of the BR network, and by 1979 BR presented a range of options that included electrifying numerous Western Region routes including Reading to Taunton line by 2000. Under the 1979–90 Conservative governments that succeeded the 1976–79 Labour government the proposal was not implemented.

== Route ==
=== Reading to Bedwyn ===
Communities served
Reading–Theale–Aldermaston–Midgham and Woolhampton–Thatcham–Newbury–Kintbury–Hungerford–Great Bedwyn

After Reading railway station the line curves to the left to follow the route of the old Berks and Hants Railway. The Great Western Main Line is on the right and between the two routes is the former Reading TMD, now an engineering depot.

Just beyond the depot lies Reading West, a local station that is elevated above a road at one end but is in a deep cutting at the other. At the far end of the cutting is Southcote Junction where the line to Plymouth curves sharply to the right away from the other Berks and Hants Line to Basingstoke. A third line used to curve to the left to a goods depot but this is long closed and the trackbed blocked by a footpath.

The route, which is marketed as the "Kennet Line", follows the River Kennet through the outer suburbs of Reading to Theale. The line passes through Berkshire countryside and local stations at Aldermaston, Midgham and Thatcham.

Newbury race course lies alongside the line on the left and has its own station a short distance east of the main Newbury railway station, where the town centre is close by on the right of the line. The station has a bay platform on the right for local terminating trains, and the through platforms are on loop lines that allow fast trains to overtake the local services that continue beyond the town. Some long-distance trains also call here.

Beyond Newbury the railway follows the route of the Kennet and Avon Canal which crosses below to run on the left side of the line through Kintbury then crosses back to the right before it reaches Hungerford. The line crosses into Wiltshire and the canal crosses back to the left to run close beside the line through Little Bedwyn to reach Bedwyn railway station which is actually in Great Bedwyn. This is the outer limit of the London suburban services and there is a turn-back siding on the right just beyond the station.

=== On to Taunton ===
Communities served
Pewsey–Westbury–Frome–Bruton–Castle Cary–Taunton

Long-distance trains continue to follow the Kennet and Avon Canal which runs along the line. Beam engines are preserved at Crofton Pumping Station that once pumped water to the summit level of the canal. The canal goes beneath the line in a 500 yards (457 m) tunnel beneath the site of the closed Savernake Low Level railway station, and the remains of the bridge that carried the Midland and South Western Junction Railway. There was never a station at Burbage but the siding served a wharf which allowed transhipment of goods between the canal and railway.

Some trains call at Pewsey railway station, where one platform building is a replica of an earlier building but the building on the main platform is original. The site of Patney and Chirton railway station marks the start of a cut-off line that avoided the long loop (to the right) through Devizes railway station on the Berks and Hants Extension Railway.

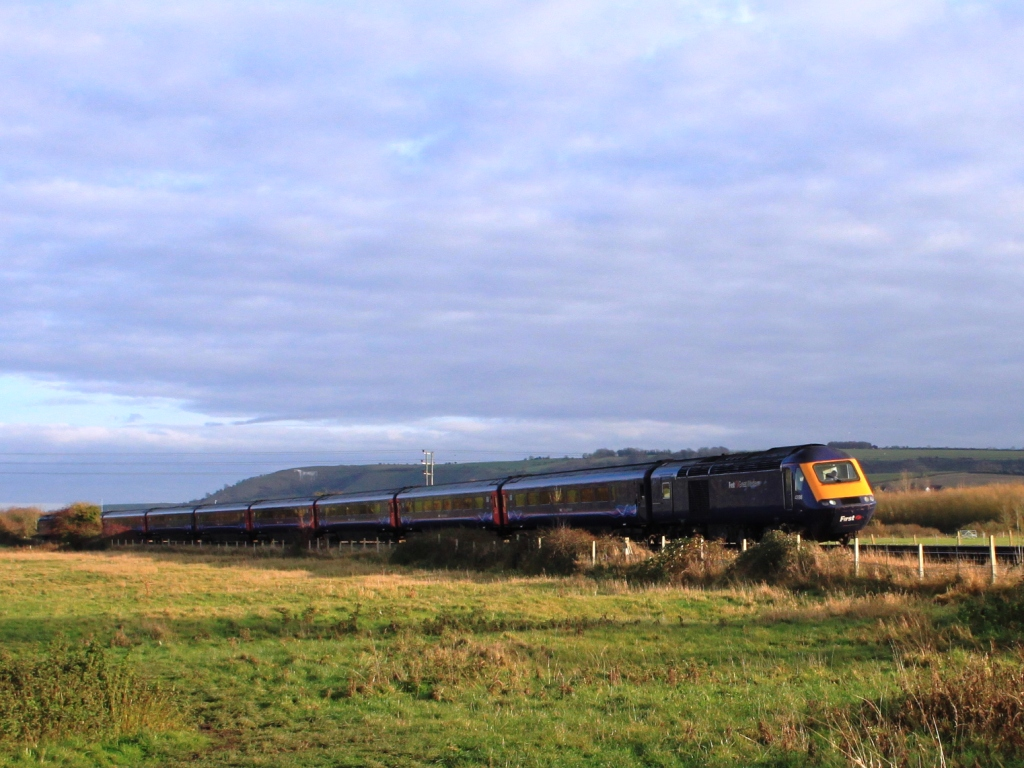
A westbound service from London passing Westbury with the Westbury White Horse in the background

Approaching Westbury, non-stop trains curve to the left to pass under the Wessex Main Line and avoid the complex of junctions around the station, but trains that call here diverge to the right at Heywood Road Junction. Another line curves sharply to the right to join the Wessex Main Line towards Trowbridge at Hawkeridge Junction, a route that forms a diversionary route for the Great Western Main Line. The line curves left past the Panel Signal Box to join the Wessex Main Line in the opposite direction and enter the station.

There are sidings on both sides of the line west of the station. On the right are those used for stabling the local DMUs between services, and a Network Rail distribution centre for ballast. The sidings on the left are mainly used by stone trains from Mendips quarries further west along the line. Our line diverges right from the Wessex Main Line (which continues towards Salisbury) and curves around behind the virtual quarry to reach Fairwood Junction where trains that avoided the station rejoin the historic route, which here was constructed by the Wilts, Somerset and Weymouth Railway.

Crossing from Wiltshire into Somerset, the line passes through Clink Road Junction, where a branch line diverges on the right to Frome railway station, where a rare wooden train shed survives, and Whatley Quarry. Frome is served by Heart of Wessex Line local services but few long-distance trains call there instead of following the avoiding line to Blatchbridge Junction.

The next junction on the right is at Witham, where the old East Somerset Railway carries stone trains from Merehead Quarry and continues to Cranmore. After passing through Bruton railway station, the line passes the remains of the Somerset and Dorset Joint Railway at Cole, and then arrives at the junction station at Castle Cary. Here it curves right, away from the Heart of Wessex Line which continues to Weymouth via Yeovil Pen Mill, a diversionary route that is used when the usual route to Exeter is blocked.

The main line is now on the Langport and Castle Cary Railway that opened on 2 July 1906 to shorten the so-called "Great Way Round" via Bristol. After passing through Somerton Tunnel the line soon finds itself crossing the low-lying and comes onto the Somerset Levels and on to Langport and Curry Rivel Junction, where the old Yeovil branch line. used to join from the left, only to diverge right at Athelney to join the Bristol to Taunton Line at Durston. The 1906 openings saw an additional cut-off from Athelney to Cogload Junction where the line joins the route from Bristol, the old Bristol and Exeter Railway. The Taunton and Bridgwater Canal runs alongside the railway. The line passes the site of Creech St Michael railway station and the junction of the former Chard Branch Line.

== Current services ==
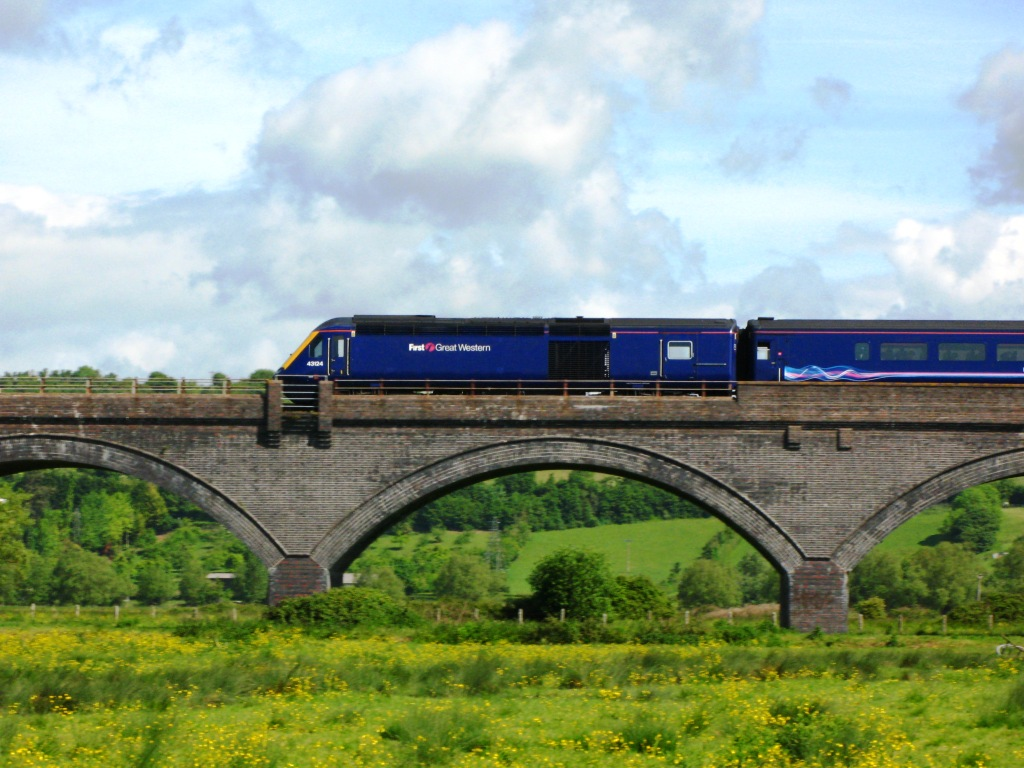
A High Speed Train crosses Langport Viaduct (between Castle Cary and Taunton).

Passenger services on the route are operated by Great Western Railway (GWR). These are principally Class 802s from London Paddington to Plymouth, Paignton or Penzance. There is also an overnight Night Riviera sleeper service. Some other services between these places are routed between Reading and Taunton along the Great Western Main Line to Bristol, and then on to the Bristol to Taunton Line, thereby missing this Reading to Taunton line entirely. A few services from London travel only part way along the line, terminating at Westbury or Frome. GWR also provide local services along parts of the line, between Reading and Bedwyn, and between Westbury and Castle Cary.

== Infrastructure ==
The route is double-track throughout, with passing loops at certain locations. The highest line-speed on the route is 110 mph (180 km/h). The route has a loading gauge clearance of W7 except Reading to Westbury which is the larger W8, and is open to rolling stock up to Route Availability 8. Signalling requires four minutes between trains on most of the route, but 8 minutes approaching Cogload Junction. Signalling is by multiple-aspect signals, controlled from panel signal boxes at Reading, Westbury and Exeter, and level-crossing boxes at Colthrop (near Thatcham) and Kintbury. Most of the signals are three-aspect, but some sections of two- or four-aspect signalling also exist. During 2010, control of the area signalled by Reading panel transferred to a new Thames Valley Signalling Control Centre at Didcot.

=== 2007 plans ===
The Network Rail Business Plan (2007) says the heaviest traffic flows are on the section through Newbury, from where there is large commuter traffic to London. The main pinch-point is between Reading West and Southcote Junction where the route is shared with trains to and from Basingstoke and south-coast ports. It was forecast in the report that demand for journeys towards London can be met up to 2016 by increased service levels; three trains each hour will be needed to the west of England. By 2026 seating demand was forecast to be in excess of capacity from as far west as Westbury, and by as much as 14%.

Plans for the route included making the down loop at Newbury Racecourse reversible to improve train handling on race days; the extension of the turnback siding at Bedwyn to accommodate six-car DMUs; increase line speed as far as Cogload Junction; a third track from there and direct access to the northern bay platform at Taunton.

=== Electrification ===
The section between Reading and Newbury was earmarked for electrification as part of a scheme to electrify the Great Western Main Line, to allow commuter services to use electrically powered trains to run the entire distance from London Paddington to Newbury. A 2009 DfT white paper called for electric services beyond Reading to be operated by cascaded and completely modernised Class 387 commuter trains from the end of 2018. This would allow the existing DMUs that operate on this section to be cascaded to the Bristol area, the South West and Northern England. Electrification from Reading to Newbury was completed in January 2019.

As part of this work, changes were made to the layout of Reading station which included the building of a bridge to carry the main lines of the Reading to Didcot route over the Taunton to Reading line to remove conflicts between the two routes. An additional four platforms were built on the north side of Reading station for the relief lines, allowing the existing platforms to be used mostly by fast trains between London and the West. The improved station was officially opened by the Queen in July 2014, and railway upgrades in the area were completed in the summer of 2015.

== Accidents ==
Serious incidents on the line include:

- Taunton train fire, Somerset – sleeping car fire, 6 July 1978.
- Ufton Nervet derailment, Berkshire – fatalities following a collision with a car that had stopped on a level crossing, 6 November 2004.
