= Pewsey railway station =

Railway station in Wiltshire, England

Pewsey
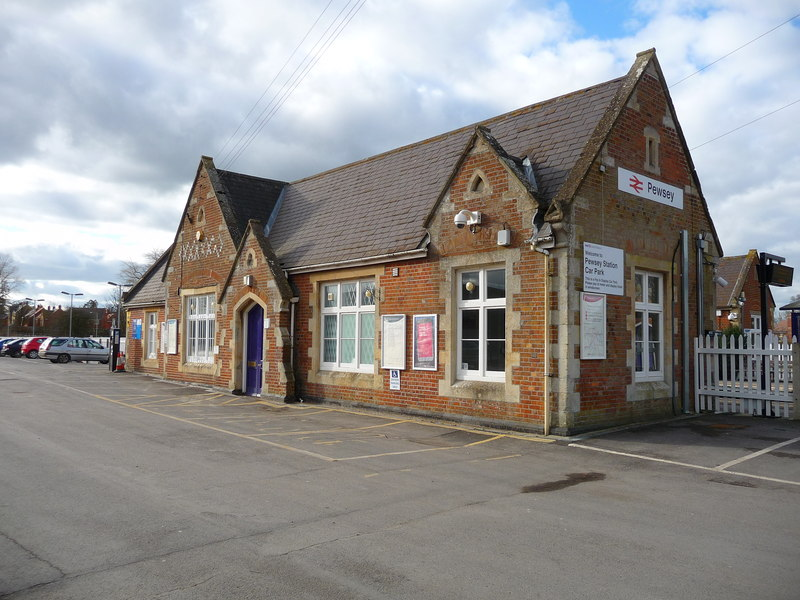
- The station building

General information
- Location: Pewsey, Wiltshire; England
- Coordinates: 51.342°N 1.771°W
- Grid reference: SU160603
- Manager: Great Western Railway
- Platforms: 2

Other information
- Station code: PEW
- Classification: DfT category D

History
- Original company: Berks and Hants Extension Railway
- Pre-grouping: Great Western Railway
- Post-grouping: Great Western Railway

Key dates
- 11 November 1862: Opened

Passengers
- 2021/22: ▲0.159 million
- 2022/23: ▲0.181 million
- 2023/24: ▲0.187 million
- 2024/25: ▲0.209 million
- 2025/26: ▲0.281 million
Location
Notes
- Passenger statistics from the Office of Rail and Road

Pewsey railway station serves the large village of Pewsey in the county of Wiltshire, England. The station is on the Berks and Hants line, 75 miles 26 chains (75.33 mi; 121.2 km) measured from the zero point at London Paddington, and served by intercity trains operated by Great Western Railway between London and the West Country.

== History ==
The station was opened by the Berks and Hants Extension Railway on 11 November 1862 when the railway opened, connecting the earlier Berks and Hants Railway with the Devizes branch of the Wilts, Somerset and Weymouth Railway, thereby creating a shorter route from London Paddington station to Weymouth. On 2 July 1906 the line became part of the Reading to Taunton line following the opening of the Castle Cary Cut-Off. A signal box was situated on the west end of the eastbound platform; it was replaced by a larger signal box in 1933 but this was closed in 1966.

In 1969, the footbridge was replaced with a secondhand one brought from Cookham. By 2015 this bridge was in poor condition and was itself replaced in 2016 by Network Rail with a new, taller, structure incorporating a rainwater drainage system and costing £465,000.

In 1985, the station was awarded a First Class award in the Best Preserved Station competition of the Association of Railway Preservation Societies. Trevor Beaven, a long-serving stationmaster who retired in December 2019, was awarded an MBE for his services in 1999.

The station drew attention after two separate incidents where trains due to stop at the station continued past to Westbury.

== Facilities ==
The station has a ticket office and a ticket machine, a car park and cycle storage, accessible toilets, waiting rooms, departure screens and help points. Both platforms have step-free access, although the footbridge connecting them does not have lifts.

== Passenger volume ==
Passenger volume at Pewsey
	2004–05	2005–06	2006–07	2007–08	2008–09	2009–10	2010–11	2011–12	2012–13	2013–14	2014–15	2015–16	2016–17	2017–18	2018–19	2019–20	2020–21	2021–22	2022–23	2023–24	2024–25
Entries and exits	142,084	147,390	150,911	169,733	178,992	181,872	202,962	210,844	203,686	204,388	218,616	233,196	238,904	247,352	221,712	269,352	47,702	158,872	181,100	187,072	209,098

The statistics cover twelve month periods that start in April.

== Services ==
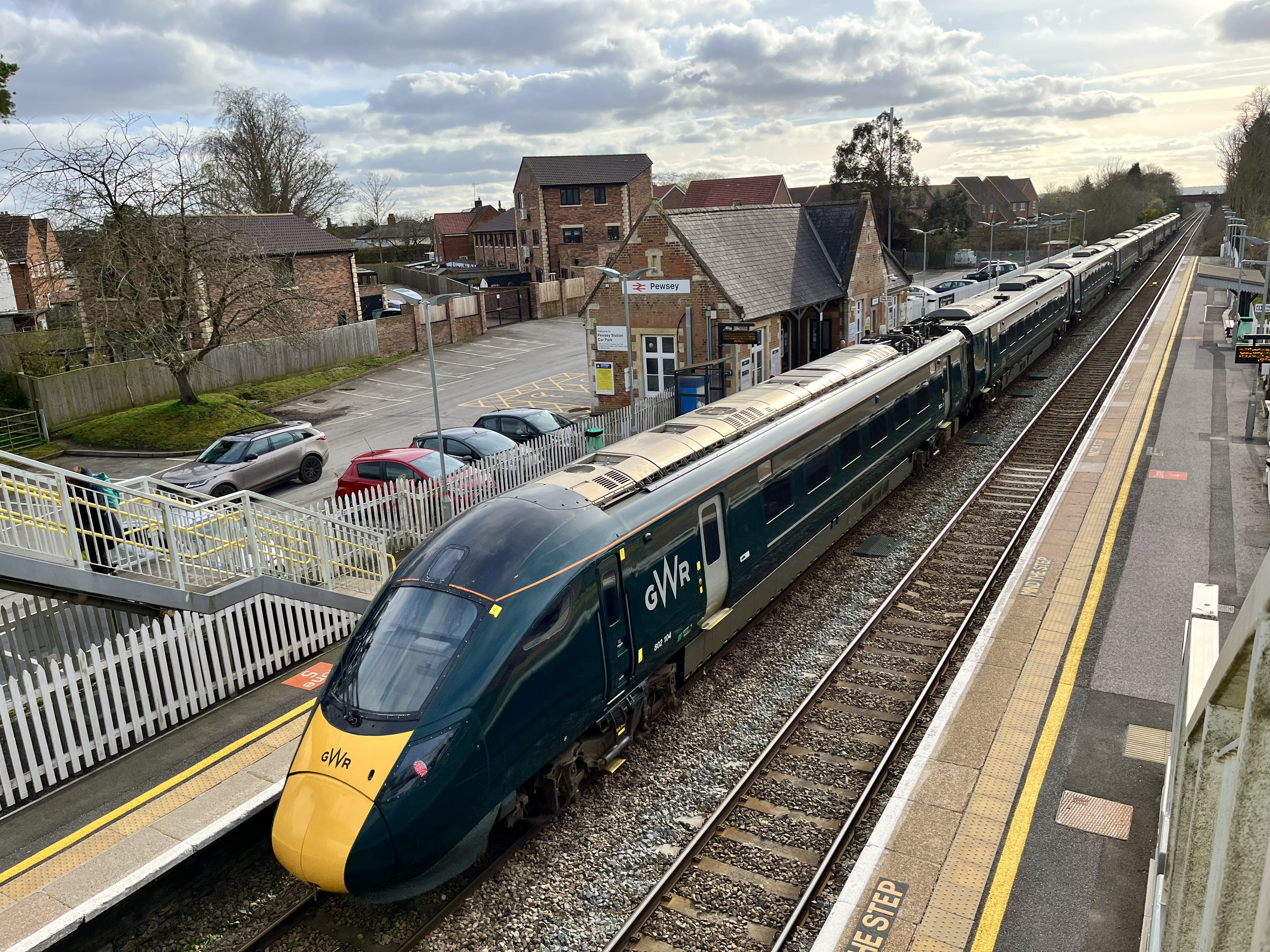
A Great Western Railway service calls at Pewsey in March 2023

All services at Pewsey are operated by Great Western Railway. Off-peak there is generally a train every 2 hours between London Paddington and Exeter St Davids of which some continue to Paignton, Plymouth or Penzance. Additional services call at Pewsey during the peak periods.

Preceding station	National Rail	Following station
Bedwyn	Great Western Railway; Reading-Taunton line	Westbury
Newbury	Great Western Railway; Reading-Taunton line	Westbury
	Historical railways	
Wootton Rivers Halt; Line open, station closed	Great Western Railway; Berks and Hants Extension Railway	Manningford Halt; Line open, station closed

== Cultural references ==
The station was featured in Episode 29 of All the Stations, on 22 June 2017. Presenters Geoff Marshall and Vicki Pipe highlighted in particular the irregular service pattern.

== Bibliography ==
- Quick, Michael (2023). Railway Passenger Stations in Great Britain: A Chronology (PDF) (5th ed.). London: Railway and Canal Historical Society.
