= Coombe, Enford =

Hamlet in Wiltshire, England

Coordinates: 51.252°N 1.786°W

Coombe
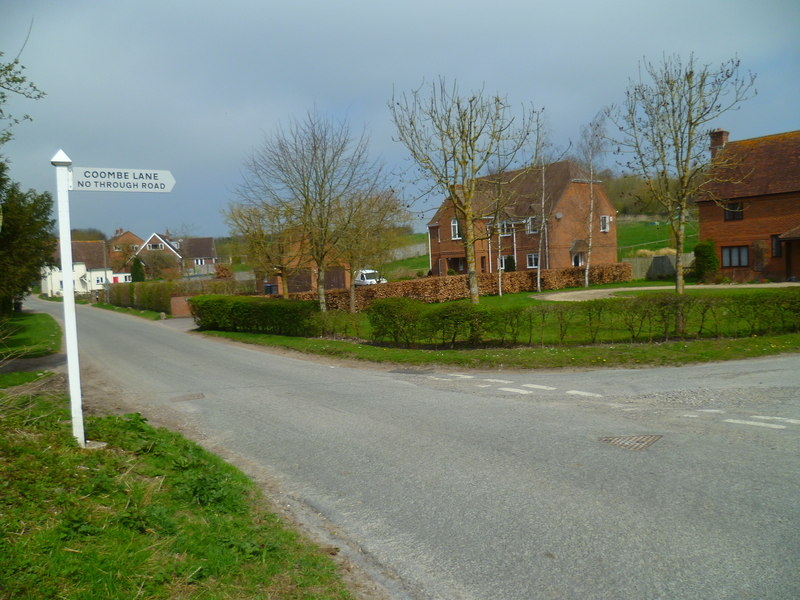
- Development by Coombe Lane

- Location within Wiltshire
- OS grid reference: SU150503
- Civil parish: Enford
- Unitary authority: Wiltshire
- Ceremonial county: Wiltshire
- Region: South West
- Country: England
- Sovereign state: United Kingdom
- Post town: PEWSEY
- Postcode district: SN9
- Dialling code: 01980
- Police: Wiltshire
- Fire: Dorset and Wiltshire
- Ambulance: South Western
- UK Parliament: East Wiltshire

Coombe is a hamlet of the civil parish of Enford, Wiltshire, England, about 13 miles (21 km) north of the cathedral city of Salisbury. It lies on the River Avon between the larger villages of Enford and Netheravon, with nearly half of its houses on the road connecting the two and the remainder in Coombe Lane.

== History ==
The history of Coombe is poorly documented, but an early reference to it dates back to the year 934, when Coombe, along with the manors of Enford, Fifield, Littlecott and Longstreet was granted by Athelstan to Winchester Cathedral as a single estate of thirty hides. Coombe was part of the Bishop of Winchester's hundred of 'Elstub', together with the larger settlements of Enford, Netheravon and Fittleton. It is thought that since the name of the neighbouring hamlet of 'Fifield' translates as 'five hides', Coombe, of similar size, may also have been valued at five hides at the time of the Domesday Book.

Since its foundation, Coombe has probably never grown much beyond the small hamlet that it is today, although no buildings survive from the earliest times. The foundations of a small chapel-of-ease dating from the Middle Ages are still said to be visible, although the chapel is thought to have fallen out of use in the 15th century.

== Amenities ==
The parish church and the nearest pub, The Swan, are at Enford.

== Economy ==
Since the only working farm was razed to make way for a small housing development in the late 1990s, Coombe has no industries and has become a commuter village, although the proliferation of the internet has allowed some people to work from home. A significant proportion of the population are, or have been, employed by the Ministry of Defence, due to Coombe's situation in the Salisbury Plain Training Area (SPTA) and proximity to several British Army camps and headquarters.

== Tourism ==
Situated between Stonehenge and Avebury, Coombe has several tourist attractions. The east end of Coombe Lane is the site of two tumuli, which could be up to 5,000 years old. Nearby fields have been the site of a number of archeological digs, including one by the television programme Time Team around three miles to the east.

The River Avon bridge crossing is a popular site for families on hot summer days due to its easy bathing access.

== Nearby settlements ==
- Netheravon
- Enford
- Amesbury
- Salisbury
- Pewsey
