= All Saints' Church, Netheravon =

Coordinates: 51.2345°N 1.7897°W

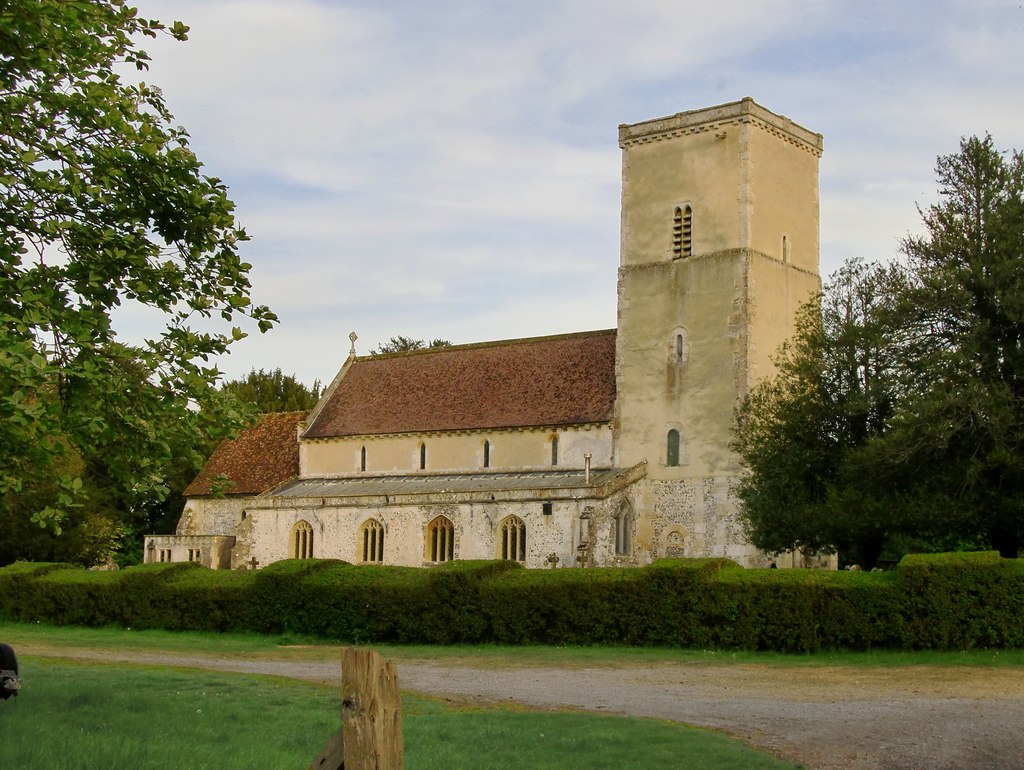
- All Saints' Church from the north-west

- Location in Wiltshire
- Location: Netheravon, Wiltshire
- Denomination: Anglican

History
- Founded: 11th century or earlier
- Dedication: All Saints

Architecture
- Heritage designation: Grade I
- Designated: 1964
- Style: Anglo-Saxon, Norman, Early English Gothic

Specifications
- Materials: Flint

Administration
- Province: Canterbury
- Diocese: Salisbury
- Archdeaconry: Sarum
- Deanery: Stonehenge
- Benefice: Avon River Team
- Parish: Netheravon

The Church of All Saints is the Church of England parish church for the village of Netheravon, Wiltshire, England. A church has stood on this site near the River Avon since Saxon times. It has been designated a Grade I listed building.

== History ==
In late Saxon times, before the Norman Conquest, Netheravon was a large and prosperous village, and this is evident by the size of the remaining Saxon work in the present building. By the early 11th century, there was a cruciform church on this site, comprising central tower, nave and small apse.

By the time of the Doomsday survey in 1086, the building was described as ruinous, but was rebuilt during early Norman times and much of that work is still evident today. The tower was raised in height upon the rebuilding of the church, but still utilising the earlier base.

The nave and chancel were rebuilt again in the 13th century, with some previous Norman work surviving, and the aisles rebuilt in the 15th century. Part of the roof was replaced in the early 17th century, and new pinnacles added to the tower in 1626, though these have since been removed.

The church underwent a major restoration starting in 1888 by C. E. Ponting, which included plastering the walls, raising the level of the roof, extending the south aisle and replacing the 13th-century chancel arch. In the early 1980s, the tower was found to have a large crack, and £50,000 was spent on repairing and restoring it.

== Architecture ==
For a relatively small village, the church is large and somewhat imposing. The principal feature of the church is the large West Tower, a largely Saxon structure. The tower is thus a rare example of a surviving pre-conquest building on a large scale. Opinions by architectural historians and experts vary on the age of the work in the tower, some placing the surviving work as early as the 9th century, others as 11th century. Most are in agreement the lower half of the present day tower formed the original central tower in the pre-conquest church. It was heightened in the 11th and 12th centuries.

The tower interior features two large pre-conquest arches, one filled with an 11th-century door on the west side as the principal entrance to the church, and a larger 19 feet (5.8 metres) high round arch on the east side, which joins the tower and nave. Historic England have described the latter as "most impressive".

The nave is 13th century, and built in a simple Early English style, with lancet windows and a small clerestory. The nave roof is relatively high, and steeply pitched. The chancel is also 13th century, with simple lancet windows and a 3-light east window. The nave and chancel were previously linked by a 13th-century chancel arch, though this was demolished and rebuilt in the 1888 restoration in the Romanesque Revival style.

There are two wall monuments in the chancel, one to Thomas Herne of Bloomsbury who died in 1799, and one to Daniel Herne who died 15 years later.

== Bells ==
The tower contains a heavy peal of six bells, the largest bell (the tenor) weighing 19 and a half hundredweight (991 kilograms) and tuned to E. There were three bells and a sanctus in 1553, with later recasts or additions in 1585 by John Wallis of Salisbury bell foundry and in 1695 by Samuel Knight, the latter of whom cast a peal of twelve for Southwark Cathedral in London some forty years later. There was also a treble by 1609, though the founder is not known. By the time of the 1911 restoration, there were five bells.

In 1911, the bells underwent a major overhaul by John Taylor & Co of Loughborough, Leicestershire. The work included recasting the 1609 treble and 1588 tenor, retuning the other bells, augmenting them to six with a new treble bell, and rehanging them all in a new cast iron frame.

The fifth bell was later replaced, either through recasting or casting a new bell, in 1945, also by John Taylor & Co. The present ring of six therefore includes four Taylor bells, three from 1911 and one from 1945, and two older bells, the aforementioned 1585 and 1695 bells by John Wallis and Samuel Knight, which today form the present 4th and 3rd bells respectively.
