= River Avon, Wiltshire =

There are two rivers in Wiltshire, England, named Avon:

- River Avon (Bristol), which flows through the north of the county and into the Bristol Channel at Avonmouth, Bristol
- River Avon (Hampshire), which flows through Salisbury and into the English Channel at Christchurch on the border of Dorset and Hampshire
