= Netheravon =

Village in Wiltshire, England

Coordinates: 51.237°N 1.790°W

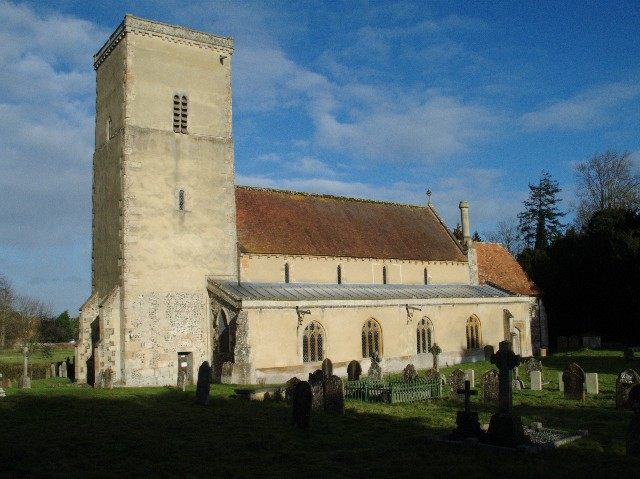
- All Saints Church

- Location within Wiltshire
- Population: 1,060 (in 2011)
- OS grid reference: SU148487
- Civil parish: Netheravon
- Unitary authority: Wiltshire
- Ceremonial county: Wiltshire
- Region: South West
- Country: England
- Sovereign state: United Kingdom
- Post town: Salisbury
- Postcode district: SP4
- Dialling code: 01980
- Police: Wiltshire
- Fire: Dorset and Wiltshire
- Ambulance: South Western
- UK Parliament: East Wiltshire
- Website: Parish Council

Netheravon is a village and civil parish on the River Avon and A345 road, about 4 miles (6.4 km) north of the town of Amesbury in Wiltshire, South West England. It is within Salisbury Plain.

The village is on the right (west) bank of the Avon, opposite Fittleton. The parish extends west onto Netheravon Down.

== History ==
A Roman villa stood near the Avon, on a site now south of Netheravon House. Domesday Book recorded three landholdings with a total of 132 households.

The Dukes of Beaufort had a large sporting estate at Netheravon in the early 18th century, which continued to be managed by their successors, the Hicks Beach family, until the end of the 19th century.

The ancient parish included West Chisenbury, a detached tithing and hamlet to the north. This area was transferred to Enford parish in 1885.

Much land in the area was bought by the War Department in 1898, including Netheravon House and almost the whole of Netheravon Parish, sold by Michael Hicks Beach. Gun ranges were established on the downs after the arrival of the army's machine gun school in 1922.

A one-room school was built on the east side of the High Street c. 1846 and later became a National School. In 1871 49 pupils were recorded, rising to 90 in 1911 and 119 in 1926, in part due to the presence of the Flying Training School. In 1964 the school was amalgamated with that at Fittleton, with infants attending Netheravon and older children going to Fittleton. In the 1980s the school at Fittleton was closed and Netheravon became a primary school, on a new site towards the southern end of the High Street.

A history by Wiltshire Council added the following specifics:

Building work in the 1960s included cottages on the west side of Mill Road being replaced by council houses... A sewerage works had been built in 1952, and a cemetery also opened in that year. After a drop in population in the 1970s the village increased in size again during the 1980s. Social events and activities were held, an historical society formed and in 1991 a new Top Hat Club founded. The Fox and Hounds closed in 1995."

Netheravon House was built after 1734 as a hunting box for Henry Scudamore, Duke of Beaufort, possibly on the site of an earlier manor house.

== Parish church ==
A church at this location was recorded in the Domesday survey of 1086. By that time, it was in ruins but was rebuilt during the Norman era; additions were made in the 1200s and later.

The Church of All Saints is built of rendered flint, has a tall west tower and its lower parts survive from the 11th century. The nave and chancel were built in the 13th century, and the aisles rebuilt in the 15th. Restoration in the 19th century, some by C.E. Ponting, included replacement of the roofs and chancel arch, and demolition of the north porch.

The peal of bells in the tower was increased from five to six in 1911, and two were recast at the same time. Of the others, one is dated 1585 and another 1695. The church was recorded as Grade I listed in 1964 as an "Anglican parish and prebendal church. C11, C12, C13 and C15".

From the early 12th century until 1846, the church was a prebend of Salisbury Cathedral. The benefice was united with Fittleton in 1953 and with Enford in 1973 but the parishes remained distinct. Today the church is part of the Avon River team ministry, which covers six parishes.

== Military camps ==
=== Cavalry School ===
Military activity was first established at Netheravon in 1904 with the creation of a cavalry school under the sponsorship of Major General Robert Baden-Powell as the Inspector General of Cavalry. Baden-Powell envisioned developments in the use of Cavalry following his experiences in Southern Africa and India, and lessons from the Second Boer War. The school emphasised the use of cavalry for scouting and reconnaissance, recognising that the traditional effects of mass of cavalry had been diminished by the availability of modern weapons. The Officers' Mess was established at Netheravon House.

=== Aviation operations and training ===
Netheravon Airfield is outside the parish, on the other bank of the Avon in Fittleton and Figheldean parishes. A grass strip airfield was created for the Royal Flying Corps northeast of Coulston Camp (later called Airfield Camp) in 1913 and later became RAF Netheravon, an operational and training base. It was the home of No. 1 Flying Training School RAF from 1919 until 1931, and during the Second World War was used again for training and as a short-term base for operational squadrons, with glider and parachute activity from 1941. In 1963 the airfield and camp were transferred to the Army, and became AAC Netheravon (Army Air Corps) from 1966 until 2012.

=== Avon Camp ===
With the establishment of the airfield in 1912, the Cavalry School continued to operate in the remaining training areas until the beginning of the war, re-opening briefly in 1919. In 1922 the school amalgamated with the Royal Artillery Riding Establishment in Northamptonshire and the site was taken over by the Machine Gun School, following a move from Grantham.

The Machine Gun School was absorbed as an element of the Small Arms School Corps in 1926. Over time the school expanded to encompass support weapons in general, becoming the Support Weapons Wing of SASC. Courses at Avon Camp included the use of:

- Mortar
- Heavy Machine Gun
- General Purpose Machine Gun – Sustained Fire
- Man Portable Anti-Tank
- Surveillance

Support Weapons Wing remained at Netheravon until 1995 when Avon Camp was closed and the Wing moved to the Land Warfare Centre, Warminster.

The part of the site known as Avon Camp West, on the A345 south of Netheravon, was proposed for the building of a new Royal Artillery Museum after the Firepower museum at Woolwich closed in 2016. However, the offer of a lease of the site was withdrawn in 2020.

== Local government ==
Netheravon is a civil parish with an elected parish council. It is in the area of Wiltshire Council, a unitary authority, which is responsible for most local government functions.

== In media ==
Channel 4 television programme Time Team briefly re-investigated the Roman villa site for a Series 4 episode, first broadcast in 1997.

== Notable people ==
Sydney Smith (1771–1845), later known as a humourist and writer, was a curate at Netheravon in the late 1790s and established a Sunday school. He left the parish after he was appointed travelling tutor to the son of Michael Hicks Beach.

The writer Frank Sawyer (1906–1980), born nearby in Bulford, lived in Netheravon while employed as a river keeper on the Avon and died on the banks of the river near the parish church. He developed the Pheasant Tail Nymph for fly fishing and wrote the books Keeper of the Stream and Nymphs and the Trout.

Oliver Kite (1920–1968) was an equally well known fly fisherman who, from 1958 until his death on the River Test from a heart attack, lived on the High Street as a near neighbour of Sawyer. He presented a Southern television series, Kite's Country, and wrote Nymph Fishing in Practice. He is buried in the Churchyard of the adjoining parish of Fittleton.
