= Frank Sawyer =

Frank Sawyer may refer to:

- Frank Sawyer (criminal) (1899–1979), American outlaw and prison escapee
- Frank Sawyer (writer) (1906–1980), riverkeeper on the Wiltshire Avon, originator of the Pheasant Tail Nymph, a fly-fishing lure
- Frank Grant Sawyer (1918–1996), Governor of Nevada, 1959–1967
- Frank Sawyer (Ohio politician) (1952–2015), member of the Ohio House of Representatives
