= Nymph (biology) =

Immature form of some invertebrates

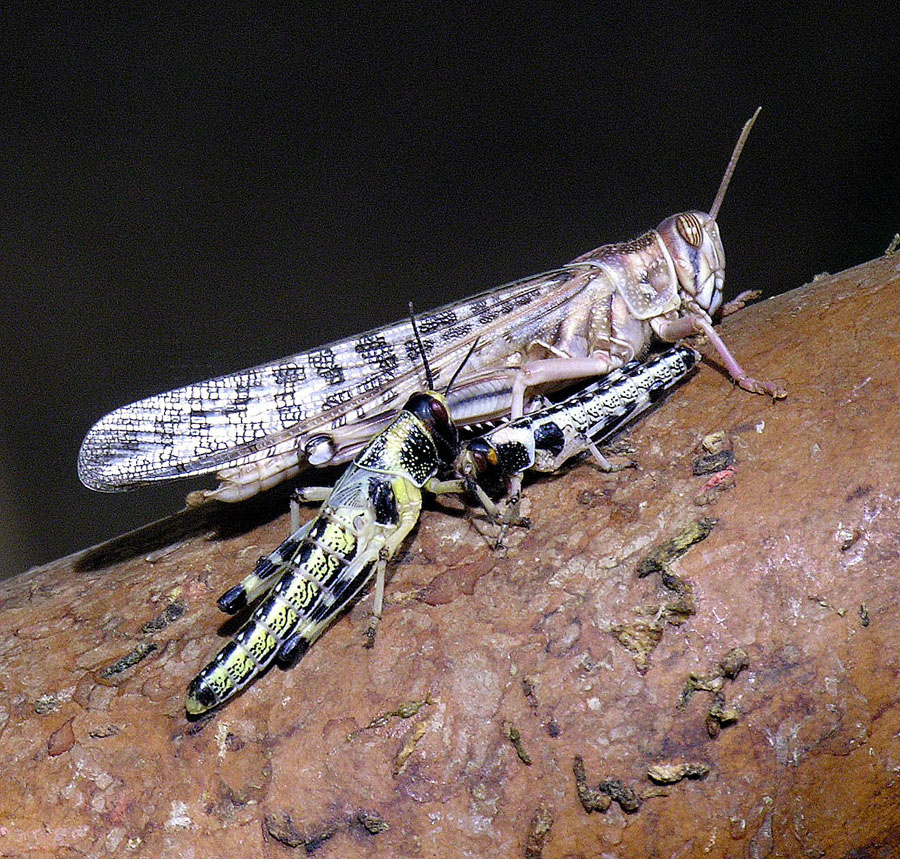
Two Schistocerca gregaria nymphs beside an adult

In biology, a nymph (from Ancient Greek νύμφα nūmphē meaning "bride") is the juvenile form of some invertebrates, particularly insects, which undergoes gradual metamorphosis (hemimetabolism) before reaching its adult stage. Unlike a typical larva, a nymph's overall form already resembles that of the adult, except for a lack of wings (in winged species) and the emergence of genitalia. In addition, while a nymph moults, it never enters a pupal stage. Instead, the final moult results in an adult insect. Nymphs undergo multiple stages of development called instars.

== Taxa with nymph stages ==
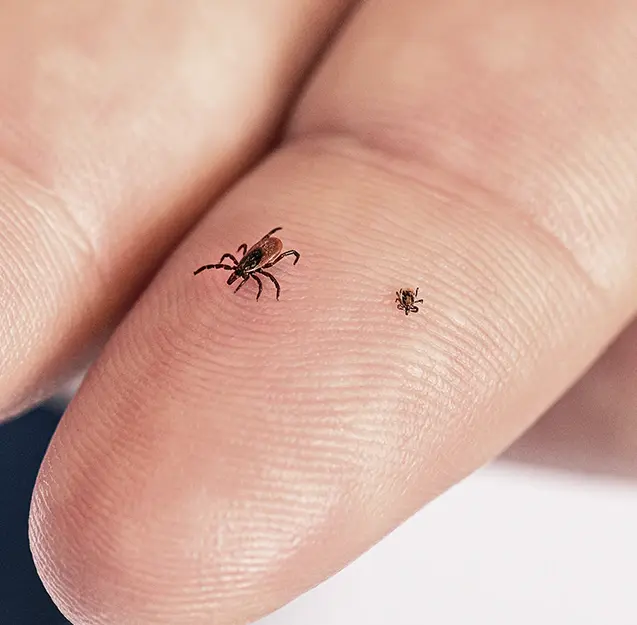
Ixodes scapularis adult and nymph, left and right.

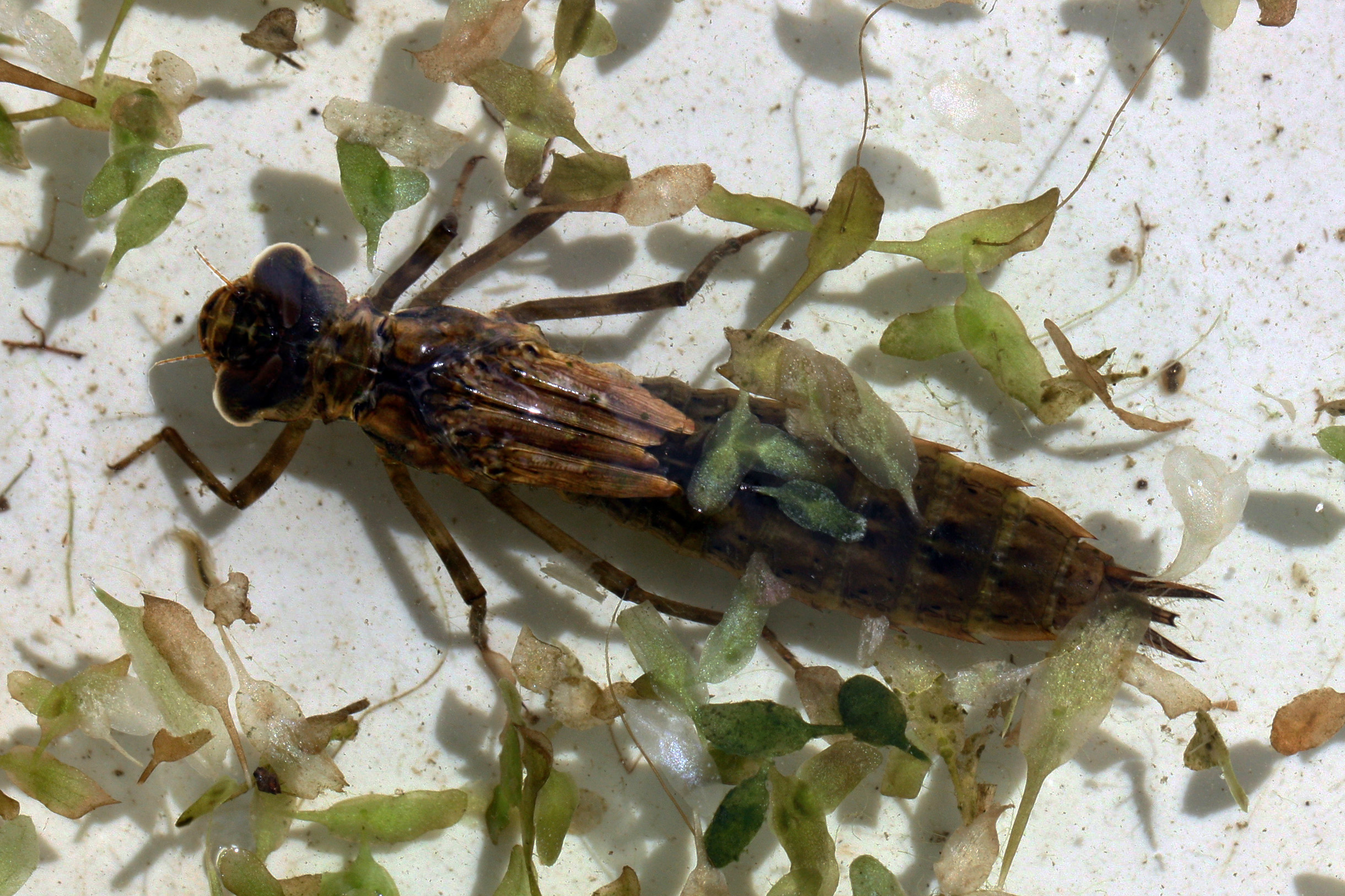
Dragonfly nymphs are aquatic, unlike the adult form. (pictured: Aeshna grandis)

Many species of arthropods have nymph stages. This includes the insect orders such as Orthoptera (crickets, grasshoppers and locusts), Hemiptera (cicadas, shield bugs, whiteflies, aphids, leafhoppers, froghoppers, treehoppers), mayflies, termites, cockroaches, mantises, stoneflies and Odonata (dragonflies and damselflies). Arachnids such as spiders, mites, and ticks also have nymphs.

Nymphs of aquatic insects, as in the Odonata, Ephemeroptera, and Plecoptera orders, are also called naiads, an Ancient Greek name for mythological water nymphs. Some entomologists have said that the terms larva, nymph and naiad should be used according to the developmental mode classification (hemimetabolous, paurometabolous or holometabolous) but others have pointed out that there is no real confusion. In older literature, these were sometimes referred to as the heterometabolous insects, as their adult and immature stages live in different environments (terrestrial vs. aquatic).

== Second Egg Hypothesis ==
In 1628, English physician William Harvey published An Anatomical Disquisition on the Motion of the Heart and Blood in Animals. In his writing, Harvey hypothesized that the pupal stage in insects was the result of imperfect eggs. While some eggs produced smaller versions of fully-matured insects known as nymphs, others created intermediate forms. Thus, these intermediate forms must go through a second egg stage to reach their adult form. This hypothesis attempts to explain the developmental differences between hemimetabolous and holometabolous metamorphosis. Though an outdated hypothesis, it was still significant towards the modern understanding of nymphs.

== Relationship with humans ==
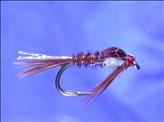
The Pheasant Tail Nymph attracts trout by imitating a brown aquatic insect larva.

In fly fishing with artificial flies, this stage of aquatic insects is the basis for an entire series of representative patterns for trout. They account for over half of the fishing fly patterns regularly used in the United States.
