= KD Hang Tuah =

Frigate

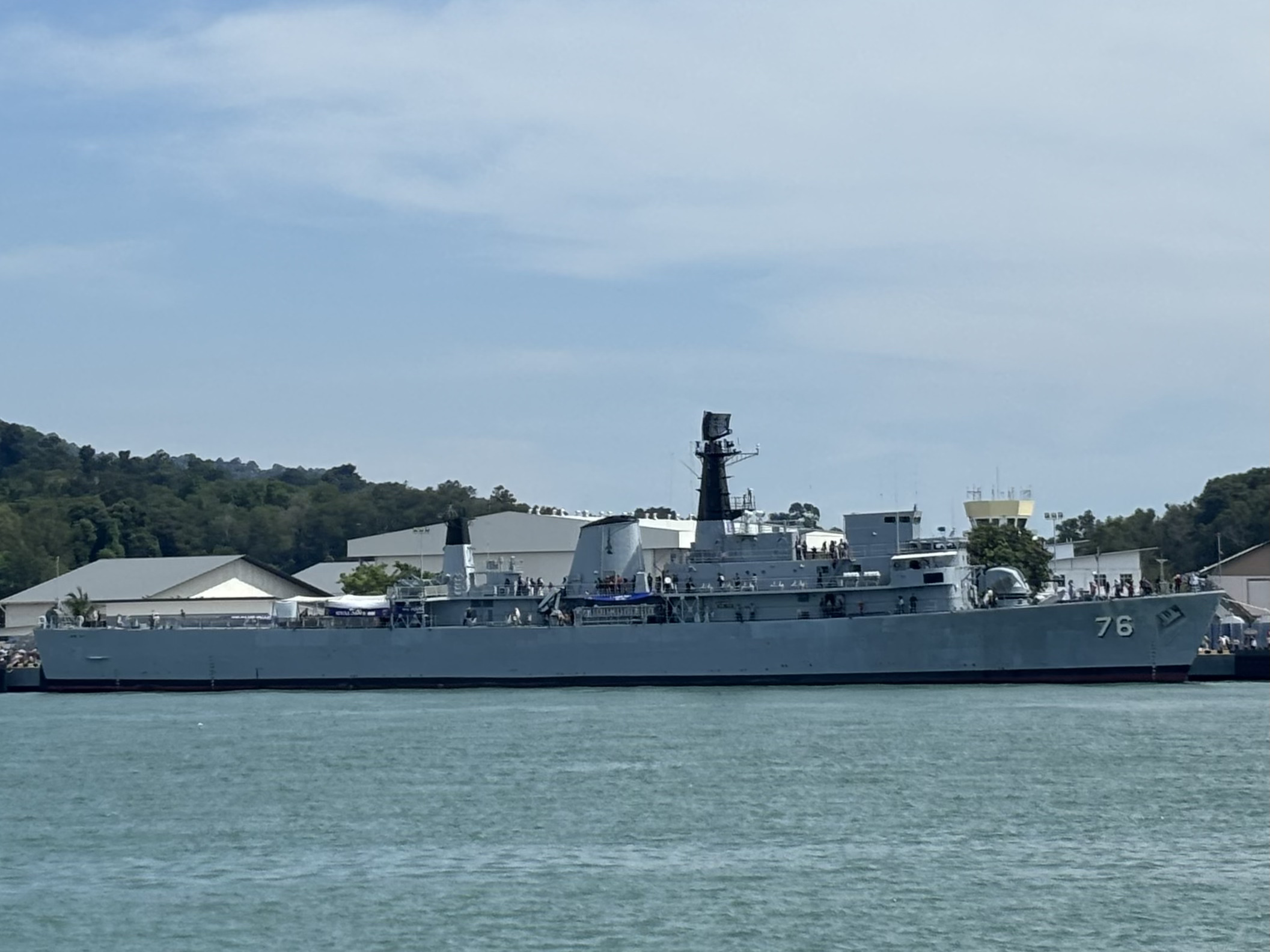
- KD Hang Tuah docking on display at Lumut Naval Base

History

Ghana
- Name: Black Star
- Builder: Yarrow Shipbuilders, Scotstoun
- Yard number: 2284
- Fate: Order canceled after Kwame Nkrumah deposed in February 1966

United Kingdom
- Launched: 29 December 1966
- Renamed: HMS Mermaid
- Commissioned: 16 May 1973
- Fate: Transferred to Royal Malaysian Navy in April 1977

Malaysia
- Name: KD Hang Tuah
- Namesake: Hang Tuah
- Acquired: April 1977
- Decommissioned: 2018
- Status: Retired as 2018 and turned into a museum ship
- Badge

General characteristics
- Type: Type 41/Type 61 frigate
- Displacement: 2,300 long tons (2,337 t) standard
- Length: 103.5 m (339 ft 7 in)
- Beam: 12.2 m (40 ft 0 in)
- Draught: 4.9 m (16 ft 1 in)
- Propulsion: 8 × 16-cylinder ASR1 diesels, 14,400 shp (10,738 kW), 2 shafts
- Speed: 24 knots (28 mph; 44 km/h)
- Complement: 210
- Sensors & processing systems: Plessey AWS1 air search radar; Decca 45 radars; Graseby Type 170B; Type 174 hull mounted sonar; UA-3 EW intercept
- Armament: (as built); 2 x 4 inch Mk 16 guns; 4 × 40 mm Bofors gun; 1 × Limbo anti-submarine Mortar; (as refitted); 1 × Bofors 57 mm gun; 2 × 40 mm Bofors gun
- Aviation facilities: Helicopter landing platform

KD Hang Tuah is a frigate formerly operated by the Royal Malaysian Navy from 1977 until 2018. She is now a museum ship. She was built in the United Kingdom, originally for the Ghana Navy, but was launched and completed as a private venture, before being purchased by the Royal Navy in 1972. She served for five years as HMS Mermaid (F76) before being purchased by Malaysia, where she replaced another ex-British frigate also called Hang Tuah. She became a training ship in 1992 and was refitted to replace obsolete weapons and machinery.

== Development ==
Hang Tuah was a singleton vessel, originally built for Ghana. It was to have been named Black Star and to have functioned as the flagship of Ghana's navy as well as the presidential yacht for Kwame Nkrumah, the President of Ghana. Built by Yarrow Shipbuilders on the River Clyde in Scotland, the new frigate was still on the slipway, when in February 1966, a military coup in Ghana ousted President Nkrumah; the new government cancelled the order due to the excessive cost of around GBP 5 million. Yarrow decided that the best course was to complete the ship in the hope that she could be sold to another navy; she was launched without any ceremony in December 1966.

The frigate was completed in June 1968 and kept at anchor for several years awaiting a buyer. In 1971, the newly elected Conservative government decided that by purchasing the ship for the Royal Navy, they could provide an indirect subsidy to a vital shipbuilder. Accordingly, in April 1972, she was transferred to Portsmouth Dockyard and then to Chatham Dockyard, to be refitted to bring her up to operational standards.

== Design ==
The hull and machinery of the ship were based on the British Type 41 and Type 61 frigates, but modified to suit the requirements of the Ghana Navy. The hull was flush decked; the large quarterdeck could be used to land a helicopter but there were no facilities to operate one. The exhausts from the eight diesel engines were trunked into a single streamlined funnel.

There were extra accommodation areas in the superstructure including a large dining and conference room. The armament and sensors were kept relatively simple to keep the cost down and for ease of maintenance. Mounted forward of the bridge was a Mark 19 mounting with twin QF 4 inch Mk 16 dual-purpose guns, there were four single Bofors 40 mm guns around the upper superstructure, and a Limbo anti-submarine mortar mounted aft in a well. Sonar Types 170 and 176 were carried as was a Plessey AWS-1 radar on the foremast and a navigational radar forward of this on a platform.

The ship had a displacement of 2,300 tons as standard, had a maximum speed of 24 knots (44 km/h; 28 mph) and a complement of 177 officers and men in Royal Navy service.

== Royal Navy service ==
She was commissioned on 16 May 1973 into the Royal Navy as HMS Mermaid with the pennant number F76 and after working up was dispatched to the Far East where she was based at Singapore. Her light armament and minimal sensor fittings made her unsuitable for a role in the European environment but could provide a useful presence in the Far East, undertaking what is now known as 'defence diplomacy' roles. She stood in for HMS Chichester (the guardship for Hong Kong) at times and stood by at the end of the Vietnam War in case British nationals had to be evacuated from Saigon.

Returning to home waters in 1976, Mermaid was deployed to protect British trawlers off Iceland during the Third Cod War. After a previous ramming incident with the Icelandic gunboat ICGV Óðinn on 12 March, she suffered heavy collision damage on 6 May during aggressive manoeuvring with the patrol boat ICGV Baldur. During a NATO exercise on 20 September 1976, she was involved in a collision with the minesweeper HMS Fittleton that resulted in the Fittleton's sinking and the deaths of 12 personnel, mainly RNR members.

Mermaid's last task before being paid off was to conduct trials on a moving target indication system that enabled radar to pick out targets moving against the clutter generated by the surface of the sea. Her Royal Navy career of only five years ended in early 1977. She was the last British warship to operate twin 4-inch guns, which had been in service for well over thirty years.

== Royal Malaysian Navy service ==
In April 1977 she was transferred to the Royal Malaysian Navy and commissioned at Southampton on 22 July, and named Hang Tuah after a legendary 15th century Malaccan warrior and Laksamana (admiral). She replaced another Hang Tuah, the ex- HMS Loch Insh, a Loch-class frigate. Although Mermaid took her predecessor's name, the Malaysian Navy retained the British pennant number F76. For a number of years she served as the flagship of the Royal Malaysian Navy after joining Rahmat as the two major assets of the Royal Malaysian Navy.

Hang Tuah became a training ship in 1992. Between 1995 and 1997, the ship was subject to a major refit, with two new diesel engines being fitted, with a power of 9,928 brake horsepower (7,403 kW) giving a speed of 20 knots (37 km/h), the obsolete 4-inch guns being replaced by a Bofors 57 mm gun, and the Squid anti-submarine mortar and sonars being removed. In 1992, Hang Tuah is serving as a training ship and is assigned to Frigate Squadron 21. In April 2017, Hang Tuah was one of the Malaysian Navy ships which were opened to the public at the "Armada 2017" event at Lumut naval base, where she celebrated her 40th anniversary. Hang Tuah was retired in 2018 and turned into a museum ship.

== Publications ==
- Baker, A.D. The Naval Institute Guide to Combat Fleets of the World 1998–1999. Annapolis, Maryland: Naval Institute Press, 1998. ISBN 1-55750-111-4.
- Colledge, J. J.; Warlow, Ben (2006) [1969]. Ships of the Royal Navy: The Complete Record of All Fighting Ships of the Royal Navy from the 15th Century to the Present (3rd Rev ed.). London: Chatham Publishing. ISBN 978-1-86176-281-8. OCLC 67375475.
- Marriott, Leo (1990). Royal Navy Frigates since 1945, Second Edition. London: Ian Allan Ltd. p. 102. ISBN 0-7110-1915-0.
