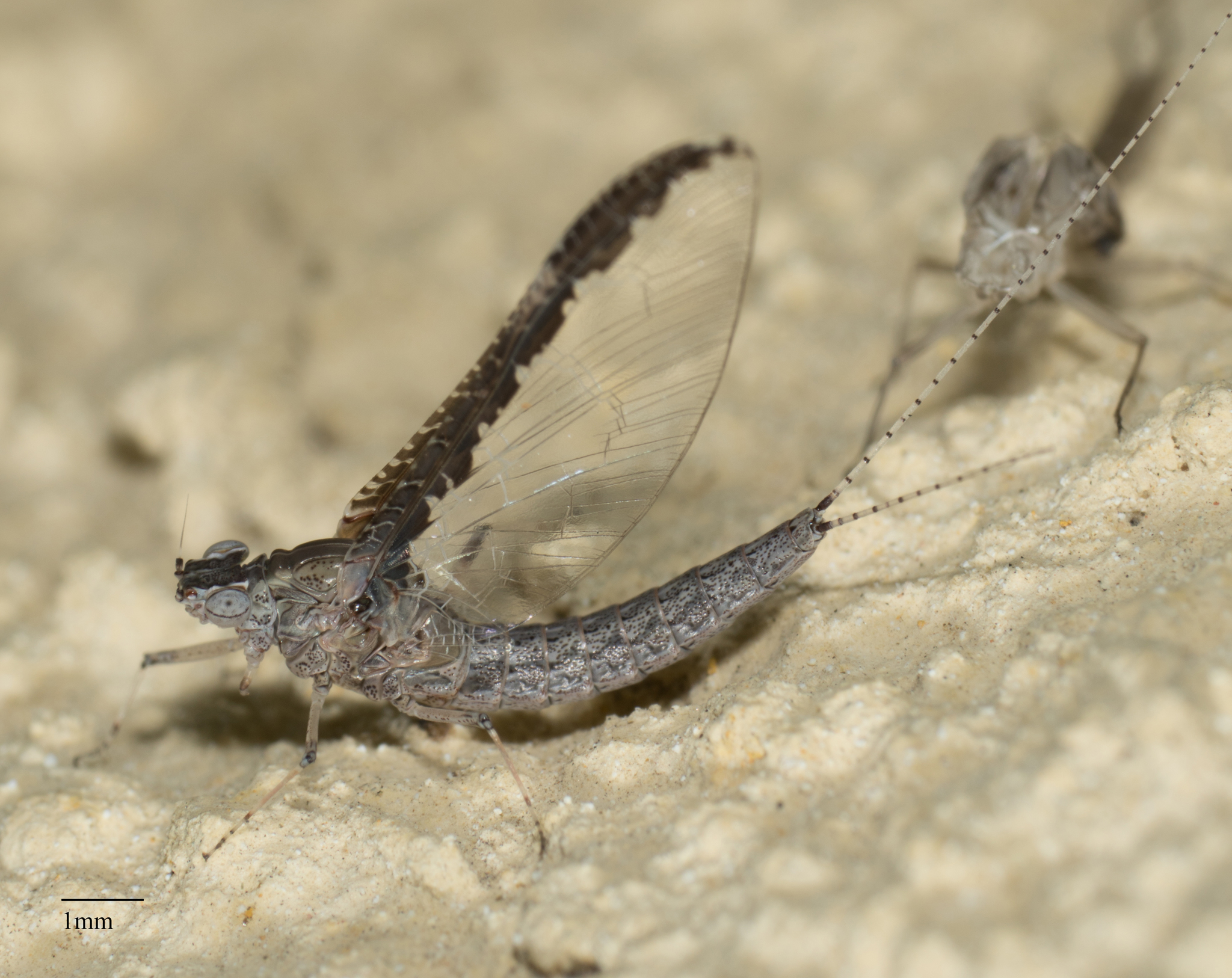

Scientific classification
- Domain: Eukaryota
- Kingdom: Animalia
- Phylum: Arthropoda
- Class: Insecta
- Order: Ephemeroptera
- Family: Baetidae
- Genus: Callibaetis
- Species: C. californicus

Binomial name
- Callibaetis californicus Banks, 1900

= Callibaetis californicus =

Species of mayfly

Callibaetis californicus is a species of small minnow mayfly in the family Baetidae. It is found in Central America and North America. In North America its range includes all of Mexico, and the western United States.
