= Callibaetis montanus =

Scientific classification
- Kingdom: Animalia
- Phylum: Arthropoda
- Class: Insecta
- Order: Ephemeroptera
- Family: Baetidae
- Genus: Callibaetis
- Species: C. montanus

Binomial name
- Callibaetis montanus Eaton, 1885

Species of mayfly

Callibaetis montanus is a species of small minnow mayfly in the family Baetidae. It is found in Central America and North America. In North America its range includes all of Mexico and the southwestern United States.
