= Patney =

Village and civil parish in Wiltshire, England

Coordinates: 51.325°N 1.898°W

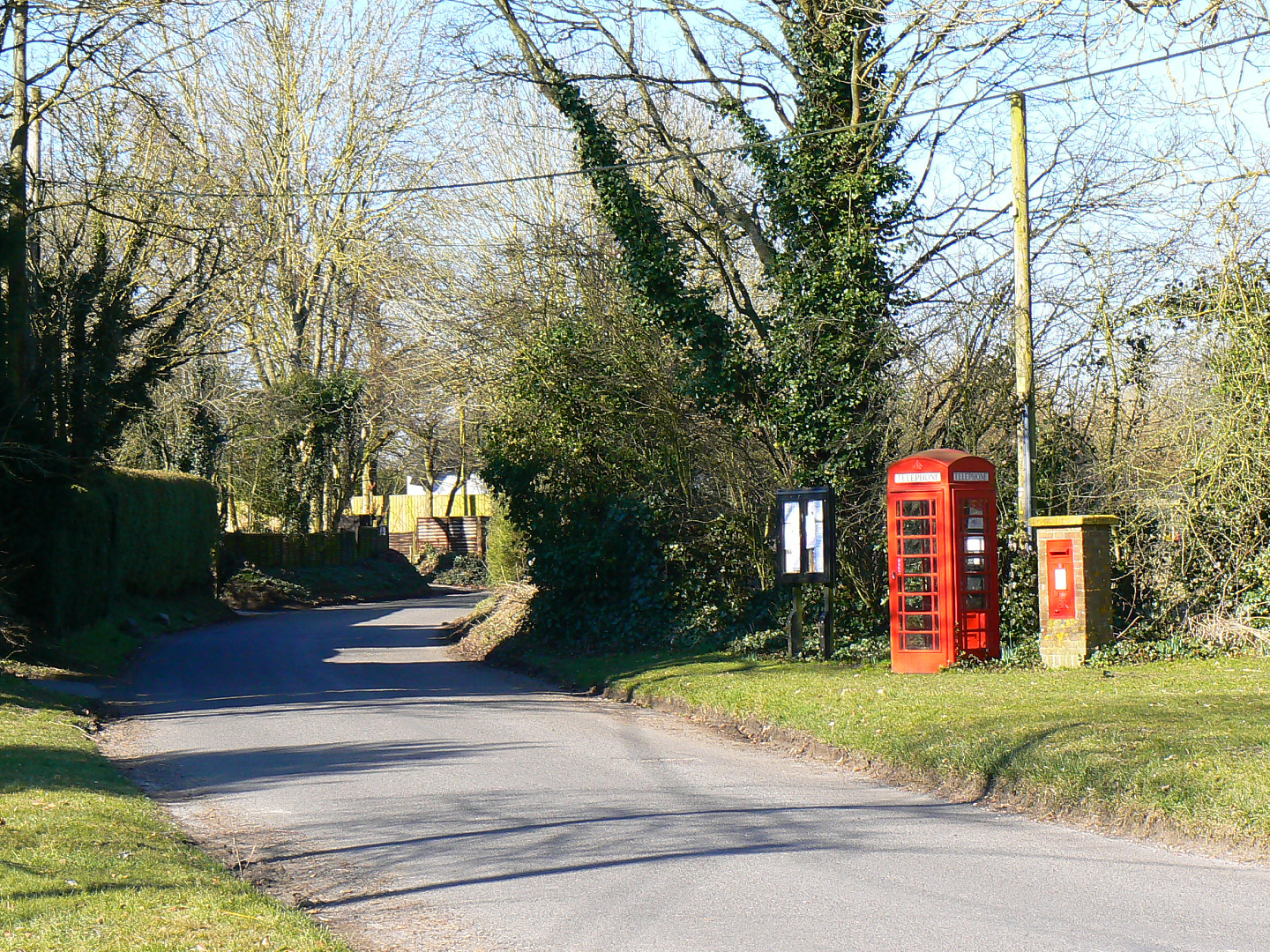
- Communications hub, Patney

- Location within Wiltshire
- Population: 155 (in 2011)
- OS grid reference: SU072584
- Civil parish: Patney
- Unitary authority: Wiltshire
- Ceremonial county: Wiltshire
- Region: South West
- Country: England
- Sovereign state: United Kingdom
- Post town: Devizes
- Postcode district: SN10
- Dialling code: 01380
- Police: Wiltshire
- Fire: Dorset and Wiltshire
- Ambulance: South Western
- UK Parliament: East Wiltshire
- Website: Parish Council

Patney is a small village and civil parish in Wiltshire, England, in the Vale of Pewsey about 4.5 miles (7.2 km) south-east of Devizes.

The infant Salisbury Avon forms part of the southern boundary of the parish.

== Religious sites ==
The nearest Anglican church is St John the Baptist at Chirton. Patney had a church since the 12th century, St Swithin's, which was rebuilt in 1878, closed in 1992, and became a private residence in 1996.

The ecclesiastical parish was united with the benefice of Chirton with Marden in 1963, and today is within the area of the Cannings and Redhorn Team Ministry which covers a group of eight churches in the Vale of Pewsey.

== Local government ==
All significant local government services are provided by Wiltshire Council, with its headquarters in Trowbridge, and the parish is represented there by Paul Oatway. In the House of Commons the parish is part of the East Wiltshire constituency.

== Railway ==
The Stert and Westbury Railway was built close to the north of the village in 1900 by the Great Western Railway Company. There was a station where the road to All Cannings crossed the line; it was closed when local services were withdrawn in 1966.
