= Callibaetis fluctuans =

Scientific classification
- Domain: Eukaryota
- Kingdom: Animalia
- Phylum: Arthropoda
- Class: Insecta
- Order: Ephemeroptera
- Family: Baetidae
- Genus: Callibaetis
- Species: C. fluctuans

Binomial name
- Callibaetis fluctuans (Walsh, 1862)

Synonyms
- Callibaetis traverae Upholt, 1937; Cloe fluctuans Walsh, 1862

Species of mayfly

Callibaetis fluctuans is a species of small minnow mayfly in the family Baetidae. It is found in southeastern Canada, the continental United States, and Alaska.
