= Chisenbury Priory =

Large house in Wiltshire, England

Coordinates: 51.2720°N 1.8012°W

Chisenbury Priory is a Grade II* listed house in East Chisenbury, Wiltshire, England. It dates from the later seventeenth century with a mid eighteenth century front that bears the date 1767 and the initials of Williams Grove. It includes a Justice Room in which courts were held as late as 1922. The building is on or near the site of a cell founded in 1112 by the Abbey of Bec-Hellouin, France, but of which no evidence now remains.
