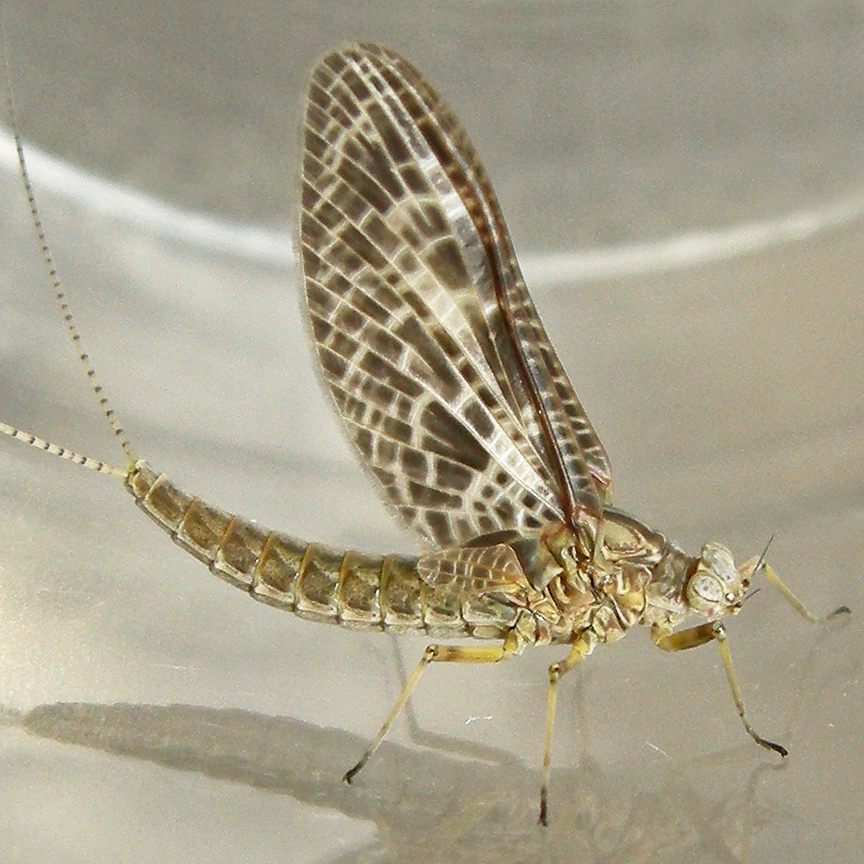

Scientific classification
- Domain: Eukaryota
- Kingdom: Animalia
- Phylum: Arthropoda
- Class: Insecta
- Order: Ephemeroptera
- Family: Baetidae
- Genus: Callibaetis
- Species: C. ferrugineus

Binomial name
- Callibaetis ferrugineus (Walsh, 1862)

Synonyms
- Cloe ferruginea Walsh, 1862

= Callibaetis ferrugineus =

Species of mayfly

Callibaetis ferrugineus is a species of small minnow mayfly in the family Baetidae. It is found in North America.

== Subspecies ==
These two subspecies belong to the species Callibaetis ferrugineus:

- Callibaetis ferrugineus ferrugineus (Walsh, 1862)
- Callibaetis ferrugineus hageni Eaton, 1885
