= HMS Fittleton =

British Royal Navy minesweeper, sunk in a collision in 1976

History

United Kingdom
- Name: HMS Fittleton
- Namesake: Fittleton, Wiltshire
- Builder: J. Samuel White, Southampton
- Laid down: 15 September 1952
- Launched: 5 February 1954
- Renamed: HMS Curzon between 1960 and 1975
- Identification: Pennant number: M1136
- Fate: Sunk in collision with HMS Mermaid on 20 September 1976; Raised and sold for scrapping

General characteristics
- Class & type: Ton-class minesweeper
- Displacement: 440 long tons
- Length: 152 ft (46.3 m)
- Beam: 28 ft (8.5 m)
- Draught: 8 ft (2.4 m)
- Propulsion: Originally Mirrlees diesel, later Napier Deltic, producing 3,000 shp (2,200 kW) on each of two shafts
- Speed: 15 knots (28 km/h)
- Armament: 1 × Bofors 40 mm L/60 gun; 1 × Oerlikon 20 mm cannon; 1 × M2 Browning machine gun

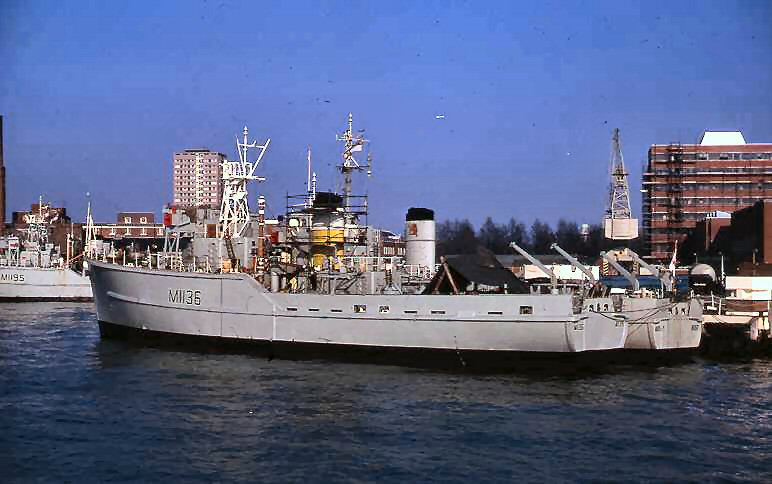
HMS Fittleton in Portsmouth Harbour, 1973

HMS Fittleton, originally named HMS Curzon, was a wooden-hulled Ton-class minesweeper of the Royal Navy which spent most of her career in the Royal Naval Reserve. She was sunk in a collision with HMS Mermaid on 20 September 1976 whilst en route to Hamburg for an official visit. Twelve naval service personnel (eleven from the Royal Naval Reserve along with one from the Royal Navy) lost their lives, making this the worst peacetime accident involving the Royal Naval Reserve.

== History ==
The ship ran aground at the entrance to Shoreham harbour, West Sussex on 25 May 1954, but she was refloated the next day. Curzon was part of the Reserve Fleet based at Hythe from 1955 until 1959. In March 1959 she had her Mirrlees engines replaced with Napier Deltic engines at Portsmouth, prior to being commissioned into the Royal Naval Reserve as HMS Curzon on 16 November 1960. She replaced HMS Bickington and docked at Maxwell's Wharf, Shoreham, home of Sussex Division RNR. She was refitted in January–May 1965 and again in January–May 1967, both at Chatham Dockyard.

She was renamed HMS Fittleton on 1 January 1976 and reassigned to the Channel Group of the Royal Naval Reserve.

== Sinking ==
Regularly crewed by a combination of Sussex and London Division RNR personnel (from HMS President), she sailed from Shoreham on 11 September 1976 with a crew largely drawn from London Division RNR to take part in Operation Teamwork, a NATO exercise in the North Sea. Following the exercise, on 20 September the ship proceeded in company with six other British minesweepers towards Hamburg for a three-day official visit to the port, after which she was to return to Shoreham. She was detailed to carry out a mail transfer with HMS Mermaid, a considerably larger ship at five times the displacement, 80 miles (130 km) north of the island of Texel. This required HMS Fittleton to steam close behind and to the side of Mermaid at about 3:30pm to pick up a line.

Fittleton was caught in a low pressure area that exists near to the hull of a ship under way and was drawn close to the frigate HMS Mermaid by hydrodynamic forces. A minor collision ensued and the Fittleton moved forward to try and exit the situation but instead was hit amidships by the bow of the much larger Mermaid and turned over within a minute. Thirty-two survivors were picked from the sea and the upturned hull by the accompanying ships, and German and Dutch vessels joined Royal Navy ships in searching for survivors, with divers entering the floating upturned hull. Attempts to keep Fittleton afloat by passing minesweeping cables underneath her propeller shafts failed when the lines parted. The ship sank several hours later, between 9 and 10 pm, in 160 feet (49 m) of water.

== Awards associated With The Incident ==
From the London Gazette 4th July 1977

The QUEEN has been graciously pleased to approve the award of the Queen's Gallantry Medal to the undermentioned:

Leading Cook (SM) David John YOUNG, DO 88829R.

On 20th September 1976 the frigate HMS Mermaid and the minesweeper HMS Fittleton were engaged in a NATO exercise 60 miles off the Dutch Coast. A heaving line transfer was taking place between the two ships when they collided twice and, as a result of the second collision, HMS Fittleton capsized and subsequently sank. Leading Cook Young was on HMS Fittleton's upper deck when the first collision occurred. He was making his way back to the ship's galley to check for damage when the ships collided again and Fittleton capsized. Flooding was immediate, and realising that he could not escape from the forward part of the ship, Young began to make his way aft through the galley flat. While he was doing this, two ratings appeared from forward, both considerably shaken and confused. Young took control, and guided both of them through the waist deep water to the wardroom flat from which they escaped to the surface. Before he could follow, a third rating appeared who was also unable to find an escape route so Young stopped to assist him. He told him to take his boots off and then guided him towards the galley flat door, which on arrival they found to be closed, thus blocking their escape.

By now there was very little air in the compartment and they were in imminent danger of drowning. Young told the rating to keep close to him and swam towards the door which he managed to open; they both then escaped by swimming underwater through the wardroom flat and up to the surface.

By putting the safety of his fellows before his own, Leading Cook Young saved the life of one rating and contributed to the escape of two others. His determination, presence of mind and selfless consideration of others was courageous and in the best traditions of the Service.

== Aftermath ==
The following day, 21 September 1976, a marine crane, Magnus lifted the wreck of the Fittleton from the seabed and the ship was taken to Den Helder in the Netherlands where she was made watertight. She was then towed back to Chatham Dockyard. Five bodies were found on the ship but seven were missing, presumed drowned.

Naval police were called in when the ship arrived at Chatham on 11 October to investigate the theft of cash following the salvage of the vessel. Fittleton's crew had been paid just an hour before the sinking, with seamen receiving £50 or £87 depending upon rank, and large amounts of sodden money were scattered around the wreck when it was raised. However, when the ship reached Chatham only £174 could be found, and six of the ten wallets also recovered were found to be empty.

Fittleton was sold to Liguria Maritime Ltd for scrapping and scrapped the following year. HMS Mermaid was later sold to the Malaysian Navy. An enquiry into the disaster took place between 24 September 1976 and 13 October 1976, and the full report was made public in 2005 under the Thirty-year rule. A memorial window was commissioned for the church at Fittleton in Wiltshire.
