= Callibaetis pictus =

- Female imago

Scientific classification
- Kingdom: Animalia
- Phylum: Arthropoda
- Clade: Pancrustacea
- Class: Insecta
- Order: Ephemeroptera
- Family: Baetidae
- Genus: Callibaetis
- Species: C. pictus

Binomial name
- Callibaetis pictus (Eaton, 1871)

Synonyms
- Baetis pictus Eaton, 1871; Callibaetis centralis Peters, 1959; Callibaetis doddsi Traver, 1935; Callibaetis pacificus Seemann, 1927; Callibaetis signatus Banks, 1918; Callibaetis vitrea Dodds, 1923

Species of mayfly

Callibaetis pictus is a species of small minnow mayfly in the family Baetidae. It is found in Central America and North America. In North America its range includes all of Mexico, the northern, and southwestern United States. It can be distinguished from other species in its range by its pale, usually W-shaped dorsal marking on tergite 6. Very similar markings are almost always present on tergites 5 and 9 as well.

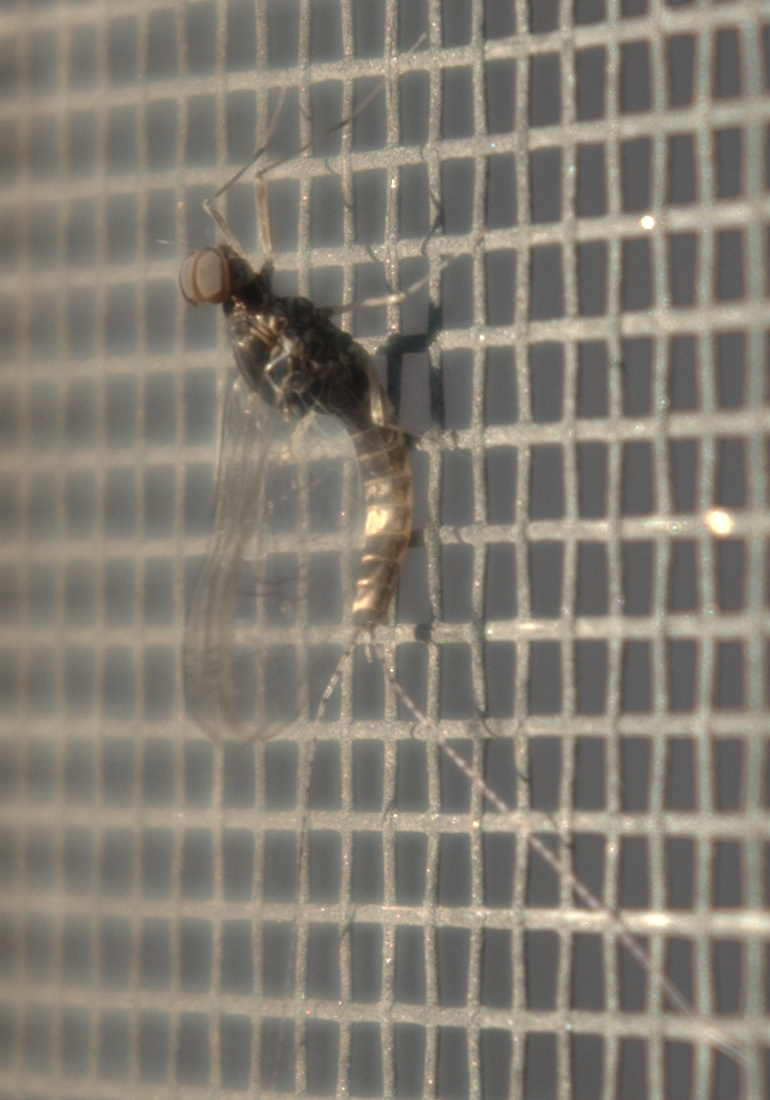
Male imago
