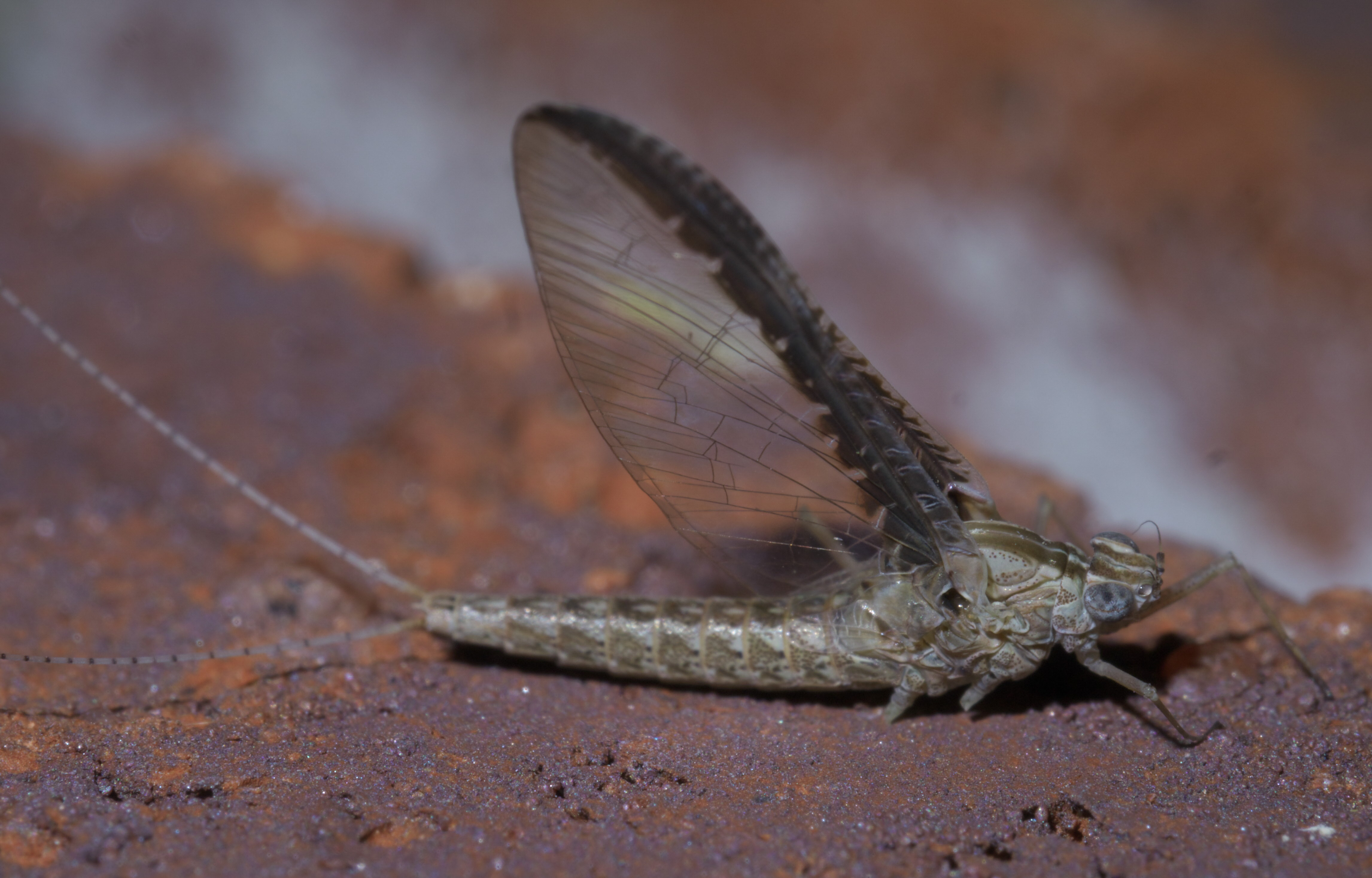

Scientific classification
- Domain: Eukaryota
- Kingdom: Animalia
- Phylum: Arthropoda
- Class: Insecta
- Order: Ephemeroptera
- Family: Baetidae
- Genus: Callibaetis
- Species: C. floridanus

Binomial name
- Callibaetis floridanus Banks, 1900

Synonyms
- Callibaetis completa Banks, 1930

= Callibaetis floridanus =

Species of mayfly

Callibaetis floridanus is a species of small minnow mayfly in the family Baetidae. It is found in Central America and North America. In North America its range includes all of Mexico, the southern, and northeastern United States.
