= River Avon System =

Biological site of special scientific interest in southern England

Coordinates: 51.025°N 1.822°W

- Site of Special Scientific Interest
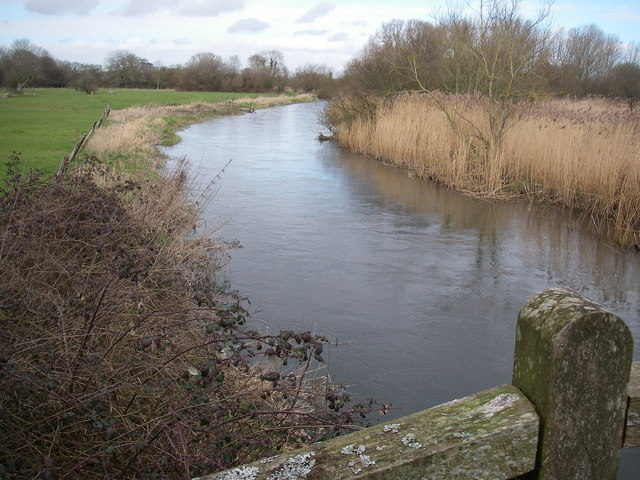
- The River Avon south of Fordingbridge
- Location of River Avon System.
- Area of search: Hampshire; Wiltshire
- Grid reference: SU 126 251
- Interest: Biological
- Area: 475.9 hectares (1,176 acres)
- Notification date: 1996
- Location map: Magic Map

River Avon System is a 475.9-hectare (1,176-acre) biological Site of Special Scientific Interest in Hampshire and Wiltshire, southern England. It is a Nature Conservation Review site, Grade I. It is part of the Avon Valley and New Forest Ramsar sites and is also part of two Special Protection Areas: Solent and Southampton Water, and the New Forest.

This site consists of stretches of the River Avon and its tributaries, which are described by Natural England as "of national and international importance for their wildlife communities". It has more than 180 species of aquatic plants and one of the most diverse fish species in the country. There is also a rich invertebrate fauna and mammals include water voles and water shrews.
