= Bickton =

Village in Hampshire, England

Coordinates: 50.9127°N 1.7909°W

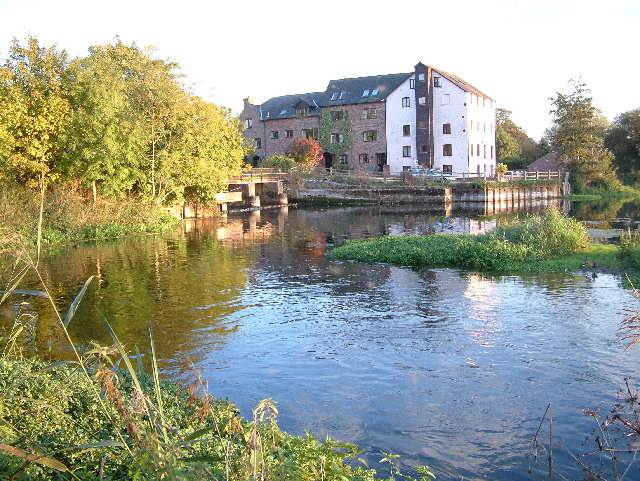
- View towards Bickton Mill

- Location within Hampshire
- OS grid reference: SU148126
- Civil parish: Fordingbridge
- District: New Forest
- Shire county: Hampshire
- Region: South East
- Country: England
- Sovereign state: United Kingdom
- Post town: FORDINGBRIDGE
- Postcode district: SP6
- Dialling code: 01425
- Police: Hampshire and Isle of Wight
- Fire: Hampshire and Isle of Wight
- Ambulance: South Central

Bickton is a hamlet in the New Forest District of Hampshire, England. It is within the civil parish of Fordingbridge and is situated by the River Avon.

== Overview ==
Bickton is a hamlet in the civil parish of Fordingbridge, next to the River Avon. The most notable buildings in the hamlet are the 15th-century manor house (with a 17th-century facade), and the 18th/19th century mill buildings.

== History ==
Bickton is recorded in the Domesday Book of 1086 when it was held by Hugh Maci from Hugh d'Avranches, 1st Earl of Chester. Before 1066 the manor had been held by "Ketil the steersman" from King Edward. As a settlement of 18 families it was at that time bigger than the manor of Fordingbridge. The overlordship in the 13th century, when it is next mentioned, belonged to the Earl of Salisbury, and as late as 1641 the manor was said to be held of the king as of the earldom of Salisbury.

In the 13th and 14th centuries the manor was in the hands of the Fitz Aucher family, and in the 15th century it was held by the Romsey family. The manor descended to the Bartholomews, but a dispute arose in the 16th century when Thomas Bartholomew and his wife Anne complained that Arthur Bulkeley and others had entered their manor-house of Bickton, broken down their hedges and gates, driven away their cattle and taken away "a greate bell hanging in the roffe of the said manor-howse wyche of a veri long tyme hadd hanged there and used as a warnyng bell when any daunger of enemyes fyer or theves were abought the seid howse." In 1632 the manor was sold to John Davenant who was at that time the bishop of Salisbury, and the manor stayed with the Davenants throughout the 17th century. It was purchased by Sir Eyre Coote in 1766, being joined to the West Park estate in Rockbourne.

A mill has existed at Bickton since the time of the Domesday Book. In the 19th century the mill employed about 25 people.
