= Frank Sawyer (writer) =

Frank Sawyer MBE (1906–1980) was an English riverkeeper, writer, and inventor of such flies as the Pheasant Tail Nymph. He died in 1980 on the banks of the River Avon at Netheravon.

== Early life ==
Sawyer was born at the Mill House in the village of Bulford, on the River Avon in Wiltshire.

== Career as Riverkeeper ==
Sawyer's first job as a riverkeeper was in 1925 on the Avon at Lake in Wiltshire, just north of Salisbury. He was employed by Lieutenant-Colonel Bailey as assistant keeper to Fred Martin and managed the six miles of river around Lake House, now owned by the musician Sting.

In 1928 he moved as head keeper to the waters of the Officers' Fishing Association, which later became the Services Dry Fly Fishing Association (SDFFA). Sawyer served as head keeper with the SDFFA until his death in 1980. The SDFFA waters included some six miles of prime chalk stream fishing on Salisbury Plain and a number of small lakes that were constructed by Sawyer in the 1960s.

By the time Sawyer took over as head keeper on the SDFFA waters, natural regeneration of wild trout had dropped markedly due to the decline of the water meadows, increased pollution and large amounts of silt running into the river from surrounding farm land and the army's tank manoeuvres on Salisbury Plain. By the early 1930s the fishery could no longer sustain a wild trout population large enough to meet the demands of fishermen. Frank Sawyer determined through detailed observation of the river that the mortality of eggs was virtually 100%; however, those few fry that did hatch had a reasonable chance of survival. Frank Sawyer introduced a large scale programme to stock the river with trout fry. Mature wild trout were caught from the Nine Mile River and other tributaries, stripped of their eggs and milt, and then returned to the river. The fertilised eggs were then reared in a purpose-built hatchery designed by Sawyer before being released into the river. Some 100,000 fry were stocked in the river each year from 1930 to 1953 and resulted in around 2,000 large fish being caught each year.

Despite the success of the trout fry stocking programme, the health of the River Avon continued to decline. The river bed became compacted and many parts of the river turned into muddy, stagnant bogs from the silt and mud running off the surrounding land and the untreated sewage and farm waste that ended up in the river. The river was rapidly becoming unsuitable for trout. Sawyer undertook a major project in the early 1950s known as "the great clean up". This involved dredging the worst-hit areas of the river to remove mud and silt, and return the bed to chalk and gravel. Old sluices and hatch gates that impounded or reduced flow were removed to speed up the flow and scour the beds clear of filth. Water meadow carrier streams were restored to provide a natural filter and a nursery for small fish and insects. Finally, silt catchment pits were dug in the worst areas to prevent the silt and run-off from reaching the main river. The work had a huge and profound effect on the River Avon: the river returned to its former glory as one of the world's premier chalk streams. There was no longer a requirement to stock trout as the natural regeneration was sufficient. There was an explosion in fly and other river life, and the fishing was described by all SDFFA members as the best in the history of the river.

The effects of the clean-up did not last more than a few years, and by the late 1950s the river's health started to decline again. Organic mud from rotting leaves built up in a few areas but the main problem was the lack of growth in the fish despite an apparent abundance of fly. It once again became necessary to conduct large scale stocking of trout to meet fishing demands. The remedy this time was the addition of fine chalk powder in large quantities throughout the fishery. Sawyer's discovery on the importance of chalk was made partly by accident and remained controversial long after his death. Sawyer noticed that when one of the lakes in the fishery was dredged, a large amount of chalk was washed into suspension. A few months later the trout in the lake had grown much fatter and were markedly bigger than the fish in the main river. Sawyer identified that the chalk cleared the water, broke down organic matter and caused an explosion in insect, snail and crustacean numbers – all important food sources for trout. Sawyer set about adding chalk to the entire fishery. The results were astounding and similar chalking carried out in France achieved equally marked results. Unfortunately, the use of chalk failed to gain much traction in fishery management as the practice of stocking large, easy to catch farm reared trout was becoming more widespread. The health of the water and food supply was much less relevant as the farm reared fish were often caught within days of being stocked and had enough fat to last a season. The natural regeneration of trout ceased to be a factor in fishery management and the water only had to be healthy enough to keep the trout alive long enough to be caught. The SDFFA and other more traditional fisheries continued to work on natural regeneration and healthy waters but the demands of chalking six miles of river were too much for a fishery working on a tight budget and the SDFFA adopted a stocking policy using trout reared in its own stock ponds.

== Nymphs ==
Sawyer is probably best remembered for the development of the 'sunken nymph' and the associated nymphing technique sometimes called the Netheravon style. Sawyer's nymphs were innovative in that they were tied with fine copper wire instead of silk or thread. This allowed the nymphs to sink and also gave them a translucent colouring when under water. Sawyer advocated the 'sink and draw' method of nymphing where the nymph was allowed to sink and then made to 'swim' towards the surface by drawing in the line or slowly lifting the rod tip. This was coupled with the 'induced take' where the nymph was made to swim up in front of a fish thereby inducing the fish to take. The Netheravon style of nymph fishing learnt from Frank Sawyer was initially popularised by the naturalist, fly fisherman and television presenter Oliver Kite in his 1963 book, republished with a biographical introduction by Robert Spaight in 2000: Nymph Fishing in Practice.

The Pheasant Tail Nymph was the first and still most widely used of Sawyer's weighted nymphs. It is tied with fine copper wire and the tail feathers of the European cock pheasant. The Pheasant Tail Nymph is designed as a generic nymph pattern and imitates any of the dark coloured swimming nymphs.

The Grey Goose Nymph was tied in the same manner as the Pheasant Tail Nymph but with light grey goose feathers. The Grey Goose nymph is a generic pattern designed to imitate the lighter coloured swimming nymphs.

The Sawyer Swedish Nymph was designed during Sawyer's visit to the Storan River system in Sweden with the famous Scandinavian fishermen Nils Farnstrom. Sawyer wrote about this trip in Nymphs and the Trout. The Sawyer Swedish Nymph is tied with a dark grey goose feather that matches the nymph of the Summer Mayfly.

Sawyer developed the Killer Bug as a means of controlling grayling numbers on the River Avon, where at the time it was considered vermin. The Killer Bug is designed to imitate the freshwater shrimp but also looks similar to a hatching sedge; it was named by Sawyer's friend Lee Wulff. It is tied with large amounts of copper wire and light beige wool. Originally the Killer Bug was tied with a wool called Chadwick's 477 but when production of this wool ceased in 1965 Sawyer switched to a specially produced copy. In fly fishing circles the original Chadwick's 477 wool is considered to have mythical fish-catching properties with lengths of the wool selling for hundreds of pounds.

The Bow Tie Buzzer was the last of Sawyer's nymphs. It has a unique design than allows the hook to rotate freely on the tippet. The Bow Tie Buzzer is designed to imitate the large midge larvae found in still waters. The pattern is tied with pheasant feathers and tin foil with a white wool 'bow tie' to imitate the cilia. The Bow Tie Buzzer must be attached to the tippet in a specific manner to allow the pattern to function properly. First the hook is threaded onto the tippet and allowed to run up and down the line freely. Secondly, a piece of white wool is tied on to the very end of the tippet. This stops the free-running hook from coming off the end of the tippet. Once cast onto still water, the hook can rotate freely in the same manner as natural midge larvae.

The Frank Sawyer Nymphs are still sold today by Sawyer Nymphs Ltd. These nymphs are tied in the original manner and made with the traditional materials used by Sawyer.

== Career as author ==
Sawyer was a prolific writer and wrote hundreds of articles and copious notes on his observations and experiments. Some of his early articles were compiled in the now classic book Keeper of the Stream. This was first published in 1952 by A. & C. Black and has been republished a number of times since. The most recent edition (2005) is a special limited edition published by Sawyer Nymphs Ltd and contains a new chapter of previously unpublished material and some photographs.

The best known of Sawyer's books is Nymphs and the Trout. The first of several editions was published in 1958 by Stanley Paul & Co., and the book has been translated into other languages. The latest publication (2006) is a special limited edition from Sawyer Nymphs Ltd that incorporates the first and second editions, a new chapter of previously unpublished material, a lengthy introduction by Frank's only son Tim and some photographs.

A biography of Sawyer entitled Man of the Riverside written by Sidney Vines was published by George Allen and Unwin in 1984. It incorporated some of Frank Sawyer's magazine articles and some of his unpublished work.

In 2006, Sawyer's grandson Nick Sawyer published a book through Sawyer Nymphs Ltd entitled Frank Sawyer's Nymphing Secrets. This included some previously unpublished work by Frank Sawyer on the art of nymphing.

== Other interests ==
Sawyer invented a number of animal traps, some of which bore his name; the best known of these, the 'Imbra', remained in use until 2018.
