= Pheasant Tail Nymph =

Fly fishing pattern

- Artificial fly
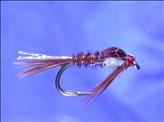
- Pheasant Tail Nymph
- Type: Nymph
- Imitates: Mayfly larvae

History
- Creator: Frank Sawyer
- Created: 1958
- Other names: Sawyer’s Pheasant Tail, PT nymph

Uses
- Primary use: Trout, Grayling

The Pheasant Tail nymph or PT Nymph or Sawyer's Pheasant Tail is a popular all purpose nymph imitation used by fly anglers. It imitates a large variety of olive, olive-brown colored aquatic insect larvae that many fish including trout and grayling feed upon.

== Origin ==
Originally conceived and tied by Frank Sawyer MBE, an English River Keeper on the Hampshire Avon in 1958, the Pheasant Tail Nymph is one of the oldest of modern nymphs. Sawyer was a friend of G. E. M. Skues, generally considered the father of modern nymph fishing and the Pheasant Tail was inspired by a fly known as the Pheasant Tail Red Spinner which seemed to catch more fished when it was submerged. Skues used a soft-hackle fly with cock pheasant tail fibers for the body, but longer hackle for the legs. This fly was unweighted and rode in the top few inches of the stream with the hackle legs extended. Sawyer observed that typical mayfly nymphs floated in the stream with their legs held close to their body. The Pheasant Tail nymph was created with wire, pheasant tail fibers and short legs to get the fly deeper in the water column as well as replicate the natural appearance of typical mayfly nymph suspended in the flow.

The pattern quickly became successful on trout streams in England and America as it was an excellent imitation of the nymphs of any mayfly species with olive or olive-brown bodies.

== Tying the fly ==
Frank Sawyers' book Nymphs and the Trout first published in 1958 describes the method of tying and fishing the nymph. The design of the fly is significantly different from other flies in that Sawyer did not use thread to construct the fly, instead opting to use very fine copper wire. This has two effects; it adds weight to the fly, enabling it to be fished deeper than similar patterns (see below), and adds a subtle brightness to an otherwise drab fly.

Frank twisted the wire and pheasant tail fibers around one another, and wrapped them forward together, forming the thorax and abdomen. A few variations have been developed over the years, however, Sawyer's simple nymph remains effective.

Frank's Pheasant Tail suggests many of the skinny nymphs that flourish in various habitats, exciting riffles to alluring deep holes in the rivers bed of chalk streams or spring creeks; and in stillwaters of all sizes.

== Fishing the Pheasant Tail ==
In streams and rivers, the Pheasant Tail can be presented below the surface if required, but it is at its most productive when allowed to sink close to the river bed on a dead drift and then gently raised in the water to imitate the behaviour of the natural insect. This behaviour of the fly stimulates trout to regard the fly as natural food, and to try to eat it, at which point the hook can be set. This technique has become known as the "Induced Take", and the development of this technique may be considered to be as important as the development of the fly itself.

In chalk streams and spring creeks trout often take up station at the most advantageous feeding position. Cast upstream and allow the current to present your Pheasant Tail in a natural manner. Alternatively, cast across the stream, allow the fly to sink, and as the fly approaches the feeding trout stop the line and allow the fly to rise in the water. Watch the trout if you can, or alternatively watch the tip of the fly line for any movement and, if seen, lift the rod tip and gently set the hook.

On lakes, this is an effective fly in the middle of the day during the Callibaetis season. Use a floating line with greased sunken leader, retrieve the fly slowly just below the surface. Pay particular attention to shallow areas near weed beds

In the UK, Sawyer's Pheasant Tail Nymph is an excellent imitation of "agile darter" nymphs, specifically Lake Olive (Cloëon simile) and Pond Olive (Cloëon dipterum) at any time of day, and can even be used during a midge (chironomidae) hatch.

== Variations ==
As described in Trout Flies-The Tier’s Reference (1999) by Dave Hughes

- Pheasant Tail Flashback
- Pheasant Tail Peacock Thorax (Al Troth)

As described in Flies for Trout , (1993) by Dick Stewart and Farrow Allen

- American Pheasant Tail Nymph
- Mostly Pheasant
Pheasant Tail Nymphs
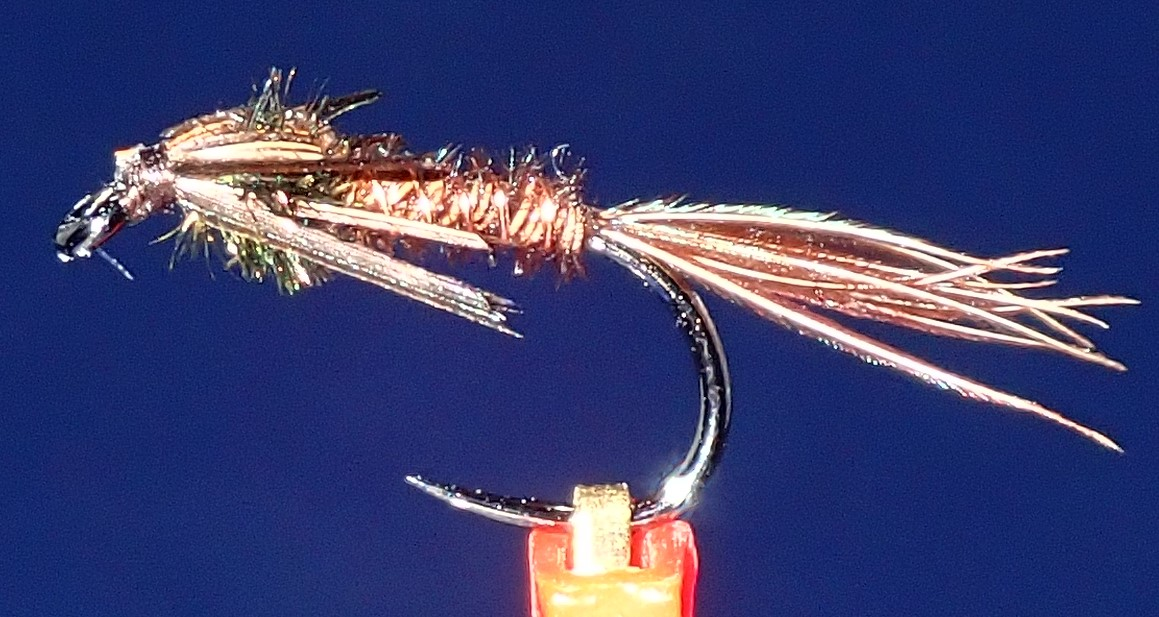
American Pheasant Tail Nymph

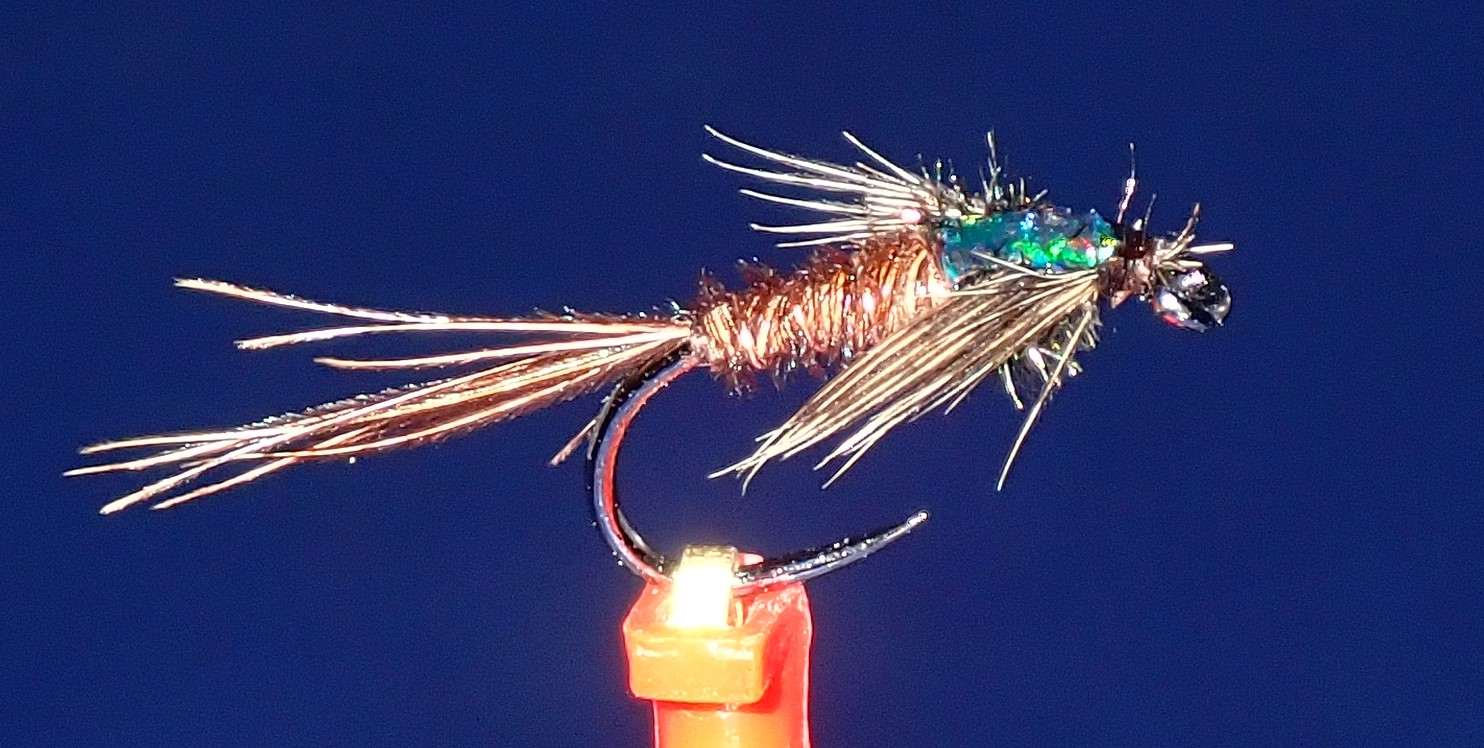
Pheasant Tail Flash Back Nymph
