= Callibaetis skokianus =

Scientific classification
- Domain: Eukaryota
- Kingdom: Animalia
- Phylum: Arthropoda
- Class: Insecta
- Order: Ephemeroptera
- Family: Baetidae
- Genus: Callibaetis
- Species: C. skokianus

Binomial name
- Callibaetis skokianus Needham, 1903

Synonyms
- Callibaetis brevicostatus Daggy, 1945

Species of mayfly

Callibaetis skokianus is a species of small minnow mayfly in the family Baetidae. It is found in the south half of Canada and the northeastern United States.
