= Callibaetis pallidus =

Scientific classification
- Domain: Eukaryota
- Kingdom: Animalia
- Phylum: Arthropoda
- Class: Insecta
- Order: Ephemeroptera
- Family: Baetidae
- Genus: Callibaetis
- Species: C. pallidus

Binomial name
- Callibaetis pallidus Banks, 1900

Synonyms
- Callibaetis semicostatus Banks, 1914

Species of mayfly

Callibaetis pallidus is a species of small minnow mayfly in the family Baetidae. It is found in North America.
