= Oliver Kite =

Oliver Kite (27 November 1920 – 15 June 1968) was a British master flyfisher, writer, broadcaster, naturalist and television personality of the 1960s.

He was born on 27 November 1920 in Castleton, Monmouthshire, and his family later moved to Lancashire. He joined the army (Royal Engineers) in 1941 and served as an officer in Sierra Leone, India, Burma, Malaya and Singapore. He married Norah Fallon in Singapore in July 1947. After a number of postings, including witnessing an atomic bomb test at Maralinga, Australia, where he suffered a heart attack at the age of 35, he settled in Netheravon, Wiltshire in 1958 and retired from the army in 1965.

Kite gained an audience among television viewers in the 1960s as the presenter of Kite's Country on Southern TV, displaying his skills as a fly fisherman and his eye for the wildlife of Wiltshire and Hampshire. Known for his simple fishing style and his invention of several fly patterns including Kite's Imperial, his friends were augmented by admirers in France, Denmark, Norway and across the UK.

Kite popularised the Netheravon style of nymph fishing invented by Frank Sawyer, the Avon riverkeeper and author and also resident in Netheravon, to whom he gave full credit in his book Nymph Fishing in Practice, first published in 1963. Kite went on to co-host a programme with Jack Hargreaves, also on Southern Television, called Country Boy: the idea being to teach a young boy from the city the ways of country life; each week this young person would be introduced to another new experience living in the country such as fishing.

Kite died of a second heart attack on the banks of the River Test in 1968, at the age of 47.

In 1969 a collection of Kite's articles for the Shooting Times magazine was published under the title "A Fisherman’s Diary".

A new edition of Nymph Fishing in Practice, with a biographical introduction and notes by Robert Spaight, was published by Swan Hill Press in 2000.
