= Fittleton cum Haxton =

Civil parish in Wiltshire, England

Coordinates: 51.245°N 1.791°W

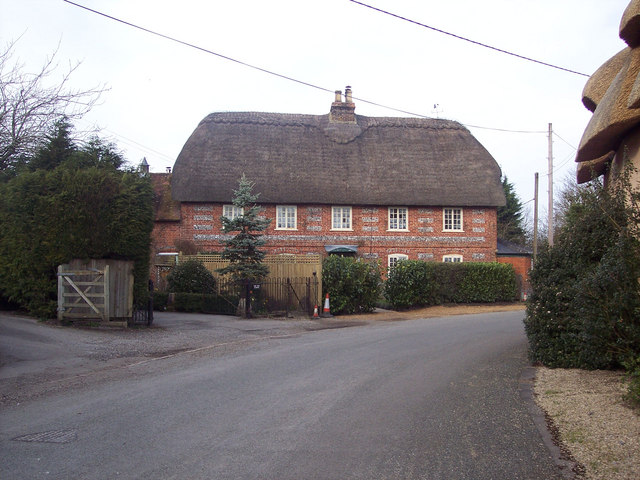
- The Old School House, Fittleton

- Location within Wiltshire
- Population: 261 (in 2011)
- OS grid reference: SU147496
- Civil parish: Fittleton cum Haxton
- Unitary authority: Wiltshire
- Ceremonial county: Wiltshire
- Region: South West
- Country: England
- Sovereign state: United Kingdom
- Post town: Salisbury
- Postcode district: SP4
- Dialling code: 01980
- Police: Wiltshire
- Fire: Dorset and Wiltshire
- Ambulance: South Western
- UK Parliament: East Wiltshire
- Website: Parish Council

Fittleton cum Haxton is a civil parish in Wiltshire, England, 12 miles (19 km) north of Salisbury. The parish contains the adjacent settlements of Fittleton and Haxton, which lie on the east bank of the River Avon opposite the village and parish of Netheravon. In 2011 the parish had a population of 261.

== History ==
Several bowl barrows are evidence of prehistoric activity in the area. On Coombe Down, a site partly within the parish was occupied in the early Iron Age, became a Romano-British settlement, and was the site of a house in the fifth or sixth century.

The Domesday Book of 1086 recorded a settlement of 24 households at Vitelstone. Later, Fittleton and Haxton were tithings of the parish, with populations of similar size.

The Manor House at Fittleton is a two-storey, five-bay house from the late 17th or early 18th century. Its stable block is from the 16th and 18th centuries, with timber framing on the north side, under a thatched roof.

Much of the downland in the parish was bought by the War Office around 1898 for military training and today forms part of the Tidworth ranges within the Salisbury Plain Training Area.

A small school was built at Fittleton in 1722, which expanded and became a National School in 1870. There were about 50 pupils in 1859 and 43 in 1906; children of all ages attended until 1926 when it became a junior school. In 1964 the school amalgamated with Netheravon school, and the older children from both parishes were educated here until the Fittleton building closed in 1989, on the opening of a new building at Netheravon.

== Church ==
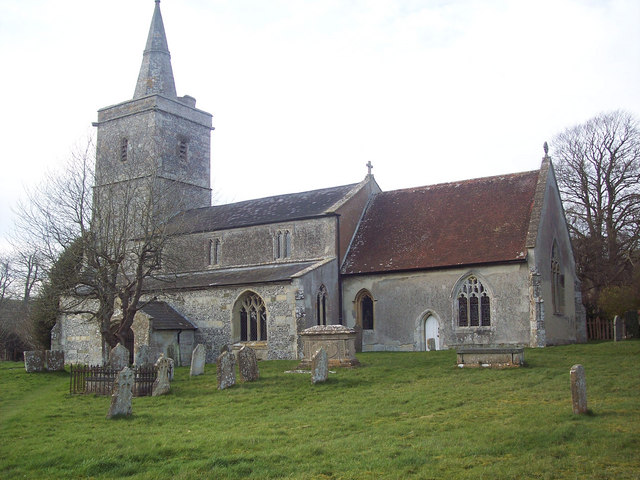
All Saints' Church

The Church of England parish church of All Saints is of flint and stone, partly rendered, with a west tower. It was begun in the 13th century and the chancel arch survives from that time. The building was enlarged in the 15th century and the south porch was added in the 16th. There is a 12th-century font, mounted on a shaft and base from a restoration undertaken in 1903.

Of the six bells in the tower, three are 17th-century and three are from 1903. The church has a memorial window for HMS Fittleton, a minesweeper of the Royal Naval Reserve which sunk in the North Sea in 1976 with the loss of twelve lives.

The church was designated as Grade II* listed in 1964. Today Fittleton is part of the Avon River Team of parishes.

== Airfield ==
Netheravon Airfield was created for the Royal Flying Corps in 1913 from farmland in the southwest of the parish, and in 1918 became RAF Netheravon, an operational and training base. It was the home of No. 1 Flying Training School RAF from 1919 until 1931, and during the Second World War was used again for training and as a short-term base for operational squadrons, with glider and parachute activity from 1941. In 1963 the airfield and camp were transferred to the Army, and became AAC Netheravon (Army Air Corps) from 1966 until 2012.

Part of the site is today used as a parachute centre, on weekdays for the Joint Services Parachute Centre (JSPC) and at weekends for the Army Parachute Association (APA).

== Local government ==
Fittleton cum Haxton elects a parish council. It falls within the area of the Wiltshire Council unitary authority, which is responsible for almost all significant local government functions.
