= ICGV Baldur =

ICGV Baldur is the name of the following vessels of the Icelandic Coast Guard:

- ICGV Baldur (1973)
- ICGV Baldur (1991)

== See also ==
- Baldur (disambiguation)
