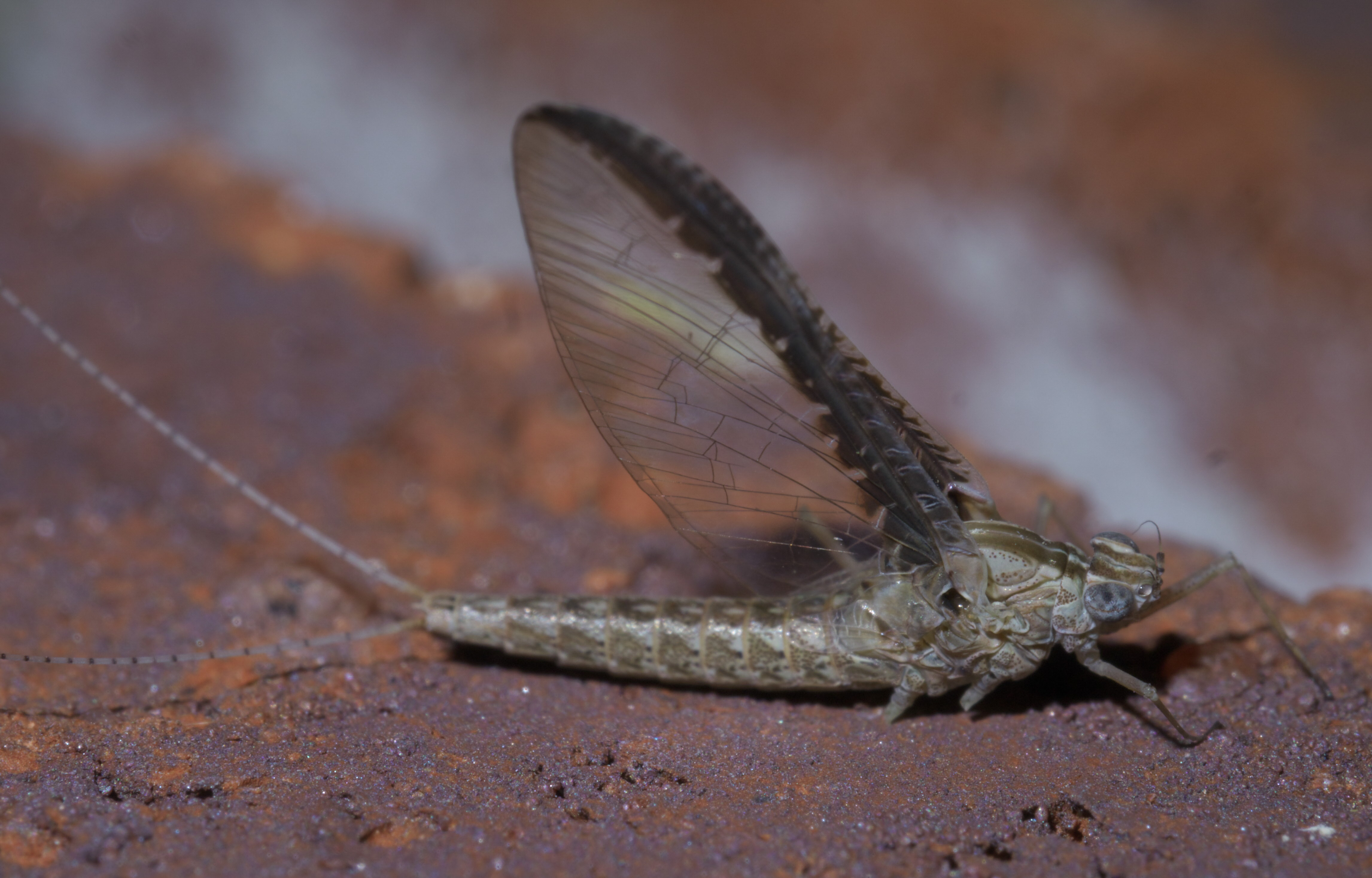
- Callibaetis floridanus

Scientific classification
- Domain: Eukaryota
- Kingdom: Animalia
- Phylum: Arthropoda
- Class: Insecta
- Order: Ephemeroptera
- Family: Baetidae
- Subfamily: Baetinae
- Genus: Callibaetis; Eaton, 1881

Synonyms
- Neobaetis Navás, 1924

= Callibaetis =

Genus of mayflies

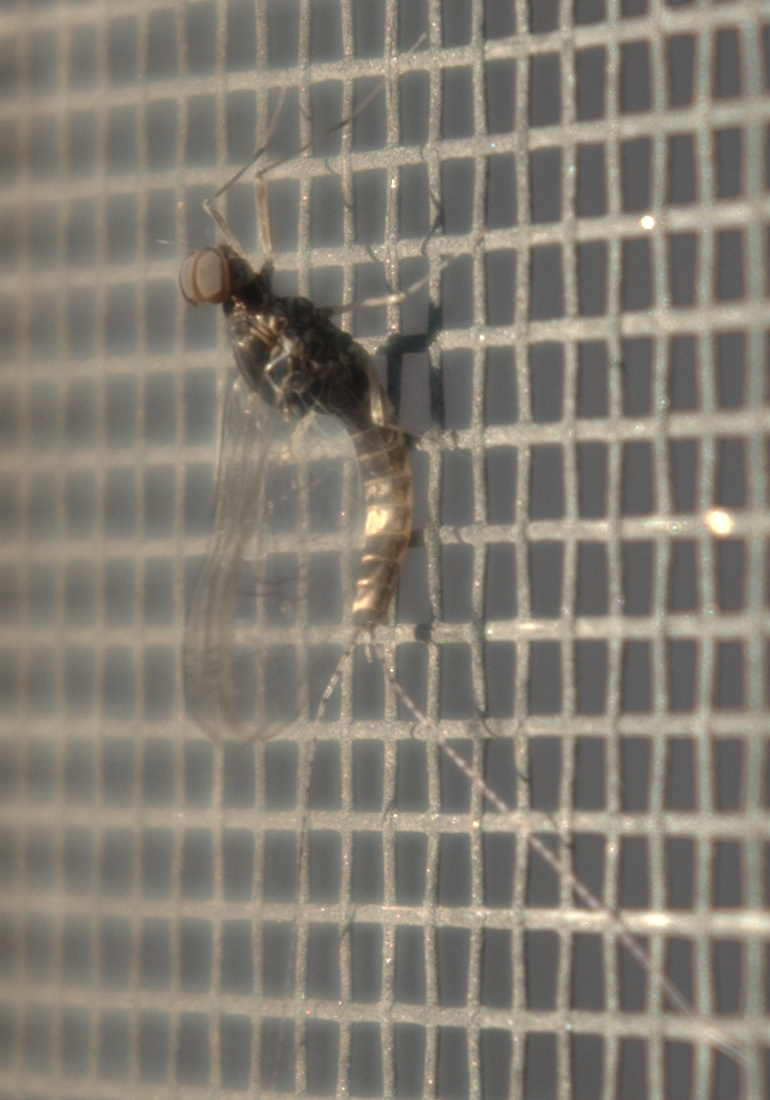
Male imago of Callibaetis pictus

Callibaetis is a genus of small minnow mayflies in the family Baetidae. There are at least 30 described species in Callibaetis.

== Species ==
These 31 species belong to the genus Callibaetis.

- Callibaetis abundans (Navás, 1912)
- Callibaetis californicus Banks, 1900
- Callibaetis camposi Navás, 1930
- Callibaetis capixaba Cruz, Salles & Hamada, 2009
- Callibaetis distinctus Lugo-Ortiz and McCafferty, 1996
- Callibaetis dominguezi Gillies, 1990
- Callibaetis fasciatus (Pictet, 1843)
- Callibaetis ferrugineus (Walsh, 1862)
- Callibaetis floridanus Banks, 1900
- Callibaetis fluctuans (Walsh, 1862)
- Callibaetis fluminensis Cruz, Salles & Hamada, 2009
- Callibaetis gonzalezi (Navás, 1934)
- Callibaetis gregarius (Navás, 1930)
- Callibaetis guttatus Navás, 1915
- Callibaetis jocosus Navás, 1912
- Callibaetis montanus Eaton, 1885
- Callibaetis nigrivenosus Banks, 1918
- Callibaetis pallidus Banks, 1900
- Callibaetis paulinus (Navás, 1924)
- Callibaetis pictus (Eaton, 1871)
- Callibaetis pollens Needham & Murphy, 1924
- Callibaetis pretiosus Banks, 1914
- Callibaetis punctilusus McCafferty and Provonsha, 1993
- Callibaetis radiatus Navás, 1920
- Callibaetis sellacki (Weyenbergh, 1883)
- Callibaetis skokiana Needham, 1903
- Callibaetis skokianus Needham, 1903
- Callibaetis undatus (Pictet, 1843)
- Callibaetis viviparius Needham & Murphy, 1924
- Callibaetis willineri Navás, 1932
- Callibaetis zonalis Navás, 1915
