= Enford =

Village in Wiltshire, England

Coordinates: 51.263°N 1.802°W

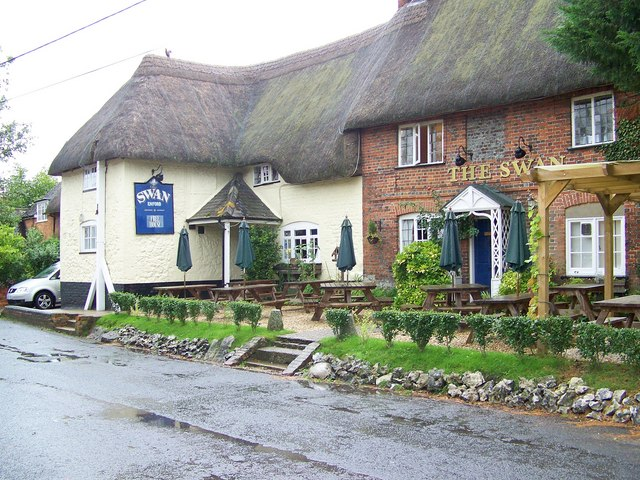
- The Swan Inn, Enford

- Location within Wiltshire
- Population: 619 (in 2011)
- OS grid reference: SU139516
- Civil parish: Enford
- Unitary authority: Wiltshire
- Ceremonial county: Wiltshire
- Region: South West
- Country: England
- Sovereign state: United Kingdom
- Post town: Pewsey
- Postcode district: SN9
- Dialling code: 01980
- Police: Wiltshire
- Fire: Dorset and Wiltshire
- Ambulance: South Western
- UK Parliament: East Wiltshire
- Website: Parish Council

Enford is a village and civil parish in Wiltshire, England, in the northeast of Salisbury Plain. The village lies 10 miles (16 km) southeast of Devizes and 14 miles (23 km) north of Salisbury. The parish includes nine small settlements along both banks of the headwaters of the River Avon. Besides Enford, these are Compton, Coombe, East Chisenbury, Fifield, Littlecott, Longstreet, New Town and West Chisenbury.

The name is derived from the Old English Enedford meaning 'duck ford'.

== History ==
The parish carries much evidence of prehistoric activity, including bowl barrows. Lidbury Camp, on Littlecott Down, was occupied in the Iron Age and in the Romano-British period, and further evidence of Romano-British occupation has been found around Compton. A site on the west bank of the Avon near Compton is possibly that of a Roman villa.

The Domesday Book of 1086 recorded 34 households at Enford and a smaller settlement at Compton. Medieval strip lynchets are visible north of East Chisenbury.

Enford manor was held by St Swithun's priory, Winchester until the Dissolution. Later owners included Thomas Culpeper (executed in 1541 for alleged adultery with Catherine Howard), and Sir Edmund Antrobus who in 1899 sold the manor to the War Office.

The parish population in 1676 has been calculated as 616. At the first census in 1841 there were 814; the population peaked at 911 in 1851 and then steadily declined to around 700 in the mid 20th century.

Chisenbury Priory is a country house, approached by a tree-lined drive from the road between Littecott and East Chisenbury. The house was built in the later 17th century, with a brick front added in the 18th; it is Grade II* listed.

A school was provided at Enford c. 1845 by Sir Edmund Antrobus, and supported partly by Sir Edmund and partly by a fund organised by John Prince, former vicar. By 1871 it had become a National School with some 61 pupils, increasing to 124 in 1906. The school moved to new buildings at Longstreet in 1966, next to the newly built village hall; it closed in 1989.

The parish gained a small area in 1885: West Chisenbury, formerly a detached part of Netheravon parish.

== Archaeology ==
The East Chisenbury midden is a notable example of a large dump of archaeological material, dating to the 1st millennium BC. Now within a military training area, the midden mound contains discrete layers of flint, charcoal, bones, pottery and excrement. It survives to a height of 8 feet (2.4 m) and is 460 feet (140 m) wide despite 2,500 years of weathering. The accumulation is believed by some archaeologists to have a ritual basis, with organised deposition of produce and waste being suggested as an explanation for its size and longevity.

The Operation Nightingale scheme, rehabilitating injured and traumatised former military personnel, had their first dig in this midden.

All Cannings Cross, 8 miles (13 km) to the north, is a similar site.

== Religious sites ==
=== Parish church ===
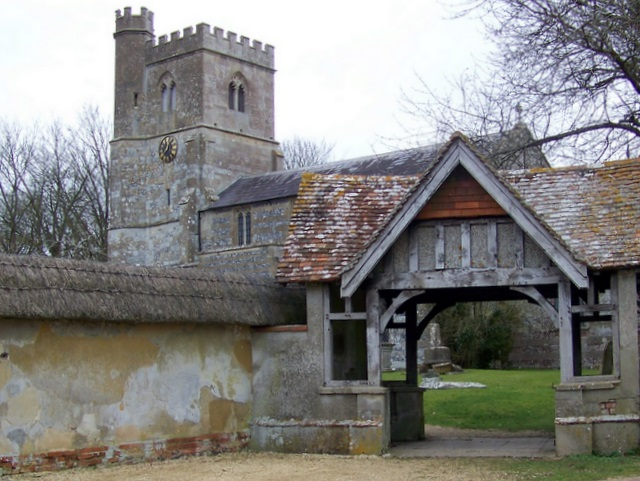
All Saints' Church

The Church of England parish church, All Saints', was described by Pevsner as "Quite a large and a very interesting church. ... The chancel is astonishing."

The Domesday Book of 1086 recorded a priest at Enford. There may have been a church here at that time, as 12th-century arches are cut into earlier walls. The chancel arch is late 12th or early 13th, while the chancel is 13th except for its south wall. A small octagonal building on the north side, built as a chapel but now the sacristy, is from a similar date. The north aisle is 14th century; in the 15th the south aisle and the tower were rebuilt. There was a spire, which fell in 1817, requiring repairs to the church in 1825–30. Restoration by C.E. Ponting took place in 1892–3.

In the churchyard is the lower part of a medieval stone cross. The six bells in the tower include three from the 17th century.

The church was designated as Grade II* listed in 1964. Today it is part of the Avon River Team parishes.

=== Methodist chapel ===
A chapel was built at East Chisenbury c. 1845 by either Primitive Methodists or Independent Methodists. A new chapel was built by the former in 1896 and continued in use well into the 20th century; the building was sold in 1990.

== Local government ==
Enford is a civil parish in the area of the Wiltshire Council unitary authority, which is responsible for all significant aspects of local government. It also has an elected parish council, with mostly consultative functions.

== Amenities ==
There is a modern village hall at Longstreet. The parish has two pubs: the Swan Inn at Enford (17th/18th century) and the Red Lion at East Chisenbury.
