= River Avon, Hampshire =

River in the south of England

River Avon
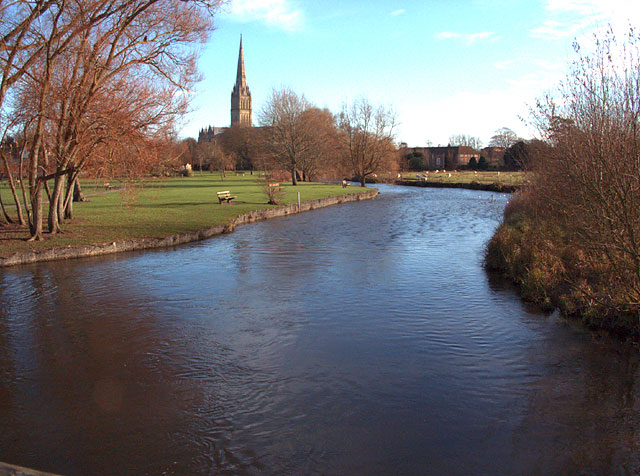
- The River Avon in Salisbury

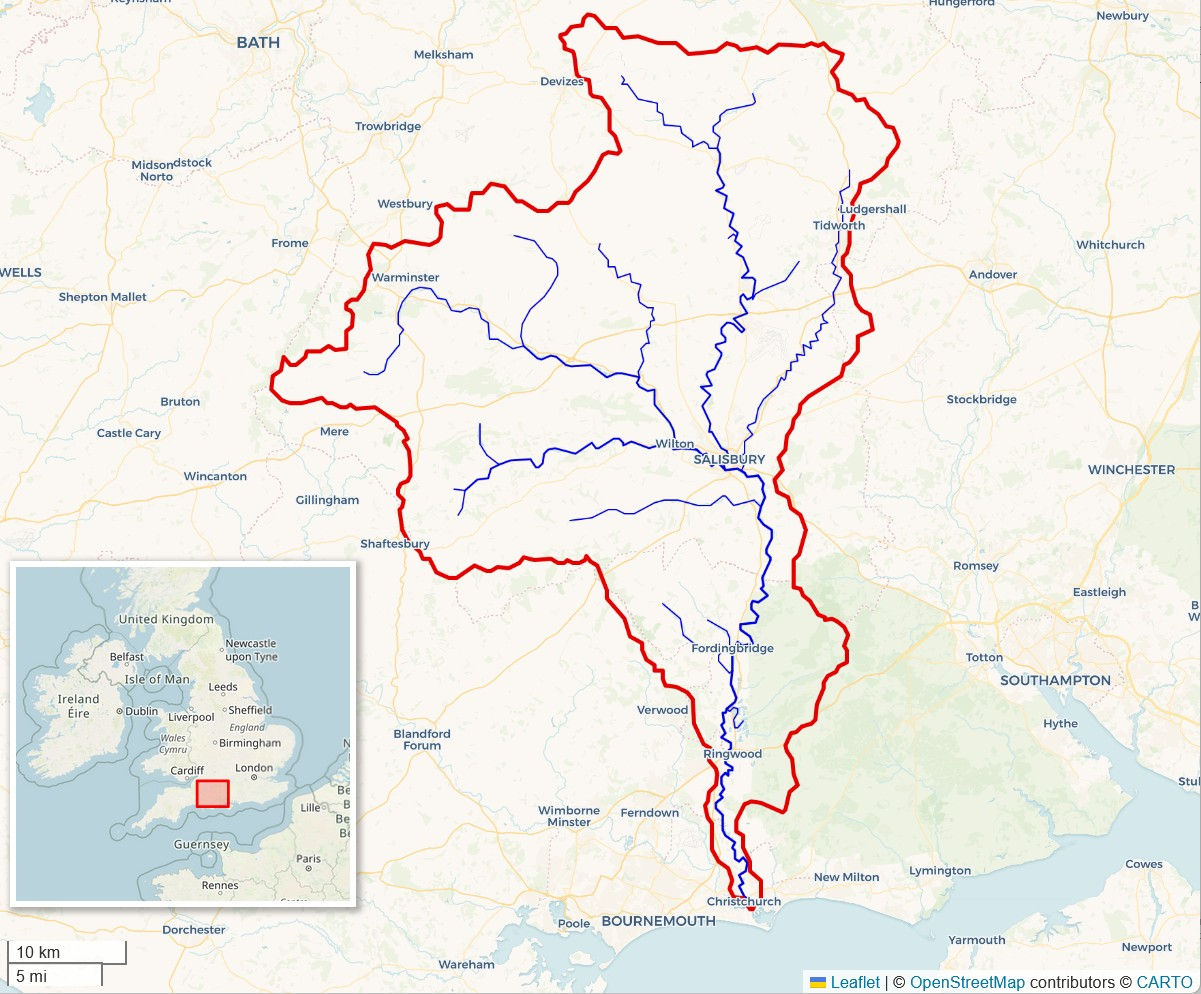
- The River Avon watershed (Interactive map)
- Etymology: Brittonic Celtic meaning river

Location
- Country: United Kingdom
- Country within the UK: England
- Counties: Wiltshire, Hampshire, Dorset

Physical characteristics
- Source
  - location: Vale of Pewsey, Wiltshire
  - coordinates: 51.3765°N 1.9523°W
  - elevation: 124 metres (407 ft)
- Mouth: English Channel
  - location: Christchurch, Dorset
  - coordinates: 50.7237°N 1.7415°W
  - elevation: 0 metres (0 ft)
- Length: 96 km (60 mi)

Basin features
- Tributaries
  - left: Bourne, Linford Brook, Nine Mile River
  - right: Nadder, Ebble, Turmer Brook, Sweatfords Water
- Designation

Ramsar Wetland
- Official name: Avon Valley
- Designated: 2 February 1998
- Reference no.: 926

The River Avon (/ˈeɪvən/ AY-vən) is in the south of England, rising in Wiltshire, flowing through that county's city of Salisbury and then west Hampshire, before reaching the English Channel through Christchurch Harbour in the Bournemouth, Christchurch and Poole conurbation of Dorset.

It is sometimes known as the Salisbury Avon or the Hampshire Avon to distinguish it from other rivers of the same name in Great Britain. It is one of the rivers in Britain in which the phenomenon of anchor ice has been observed. The Avon is thought to contain more species of fish than any other river in Britain. Long-farmed pastures and planted, arable fields line much of the valley; an indication of the wealth these brought to landowners is in ten large listed houses with statutorily recognised and protected parks. Many prehistoric sites and broader "landscapes" are found on either side of the river, the largest being the World Heritage Site zone of Stonehenge, Avebury and Associated Sites, followed by the Old Sarum knoll fortification and the Thornham Down prehistoric and medieval landscape.

== Etymology ==
The river's name is a tautology: Avon is the Proto-Brythonic word meaning "river".

== Course ==
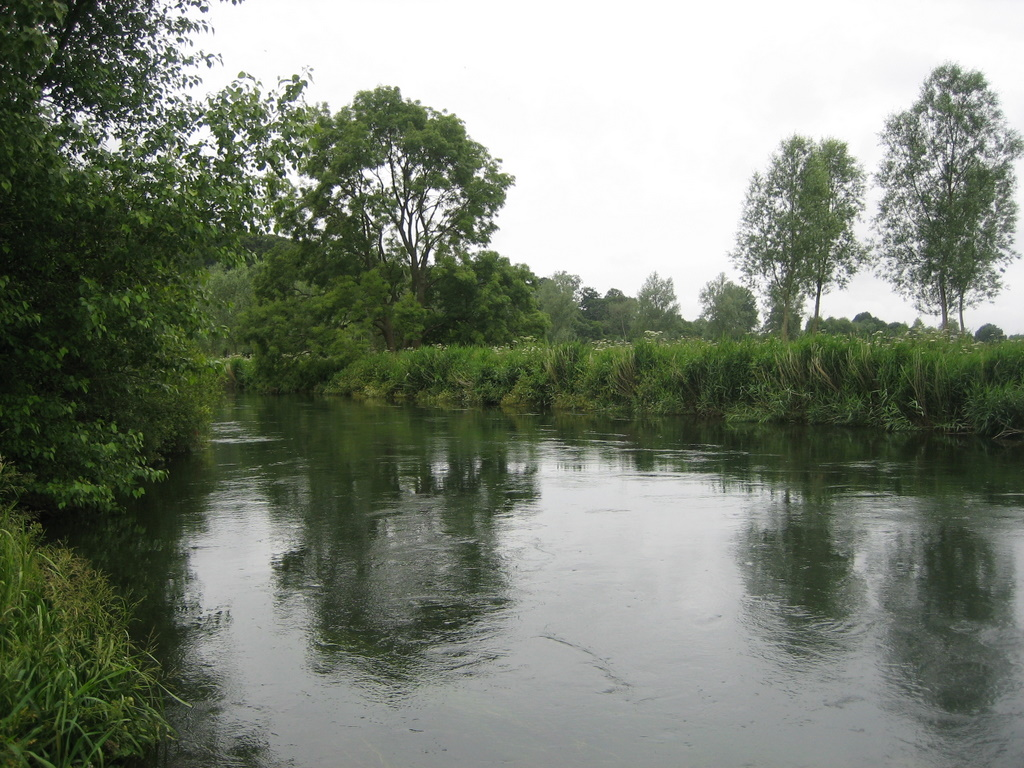
The start of the lower half, near Fordingbridge

The Avon begins as two separate bodies of water. The western arm rises to the east of Devizes, draining the Vale of Pewsey, and is joined by Etchilhampton Water which rises in the Bishops Cannings area and flows south past Etchilhampton and through Patney. The eastern arm rises at Easton Royal, east of Pewsey, and is joined by the Woodborough Stream which rises at Alton Priors and flows south through Woodborough and North Newnton.

The two branches merge at Upavon, flowing southwards across Salisbury Plain through Durrington, Amesbury and Salisbury. To the south of Salisbury the river enters the Hampshire Basin, flowing along the western edge of the New Forest through Fordingbridge and Ringwood, on to the two-mile-long Royalty stretch at Christchurch, Dorset, before meeting the River Stour and flowing into Christchurch Harbour, on the Dorset coast. The harbour opens into the English Channel past a cluster of small mouths of brooks from the New Forest and a broad sandbank, which is all built up as the Mudeford part of the harbour.

All the significant direct and indirect tributaries of the Avon, including the Nadder, Wylye, Bourne and Ebble, converge within a short distance around Salisbury.

A short distance north from the river's western source is Morgan's Hill, which marks the hydrological triple divide of Great Britain, where rainfall drains into the English Channel (via this River Avon), the Atlantic Ocean (via the Bristol Avon and Severn Estuary) and the North Sea (via the Kennet and Thames).

About half of the river is in Wiltshire; the rest is split between Hampshire and (since the 1974 boundary changes) Dorset.

As two Avons drain parts of Wiltshire, the river is popularly known as the Hampshire Avon or the Salisbury Avon (and the other as the Bristol Avon).

== 17th-century navigation ==
River Avon Navigation (Christchurch to New Sarum) Act 1664
- Act of Parliament
- Parliament of England
- Long title: An Act for making the River Avon navigable from Christ Church to the City of New Sarum.
- Citation: 16 & 17 Cha. 2. c. 12; 16 & 17 Cha. 2. c. 11 Pr.
- Territorial extent: England and Wales

Dates
- Royal assent: 2 March 1665
- Commencement: 24 November 1664 (Note: Start of session.)
Other legislation
Amended by	Itchin Navigation Rates Act 1820

Status: Amended

Text of statute as originally enacted

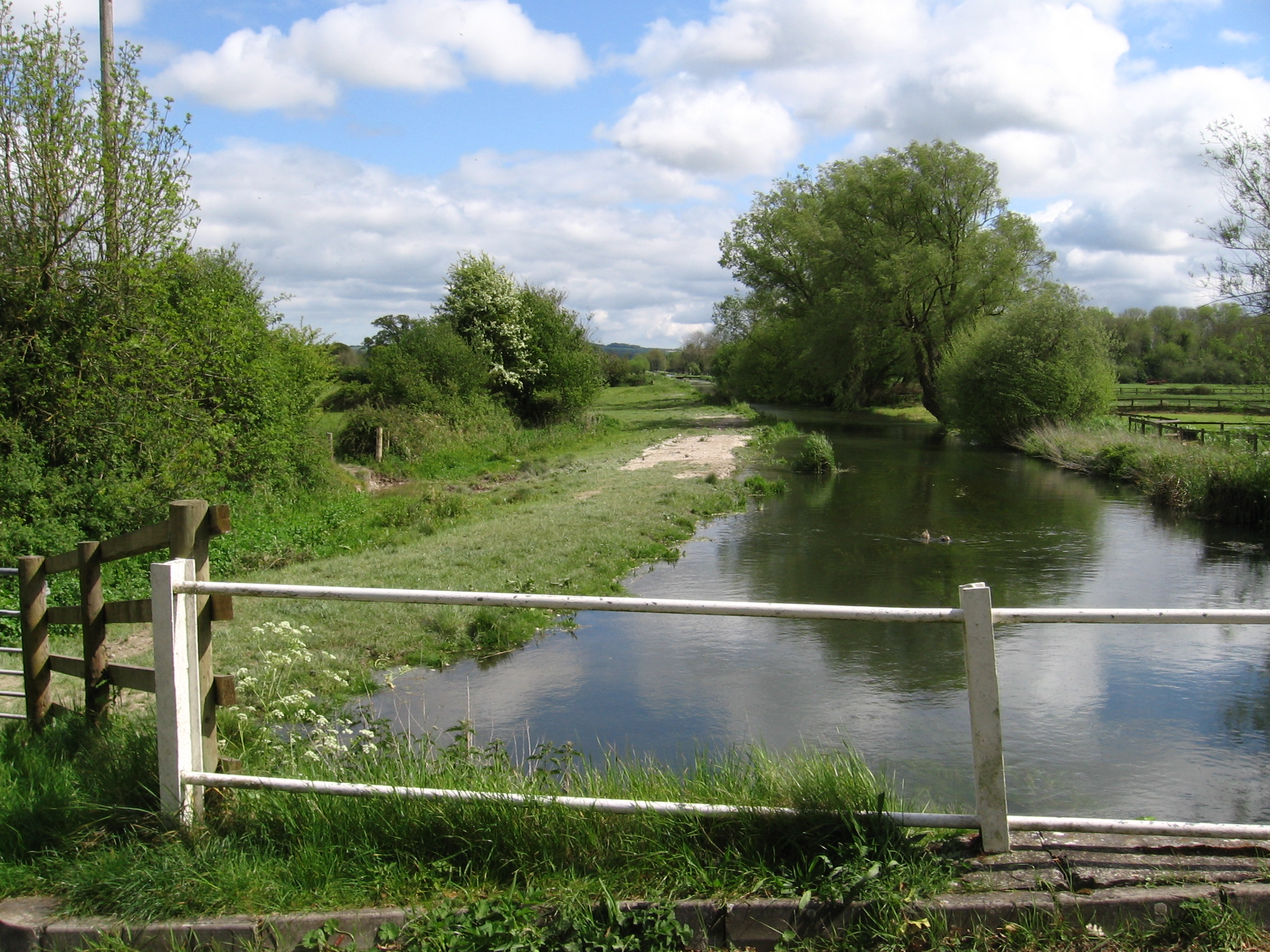
The 17th-century navigation channel near Britford is still in water

Construction of a navigation from Salisbury to Christchurch was authorised by the River Avon Navigation (Christchurch to New Sarum) Act 1664 (16 & 17 Cha. 2. c. 12). Work began in 1675 and the route was completed in 1684, but it fell out of use around 1715. Canalised channels were dug to straighten sections of the river, including one through Britford parish just below Salisbury; a lock survives on this section near Longford Castle, having been rebuilt in brick as a pound lock soon after the original flash lock was damaged by flooding in the early 18th century.

== Paths ==
The Pewsey Avon Trail follows much of the river from Pewsey to Salisbury, using pre-existing rights of way. The Avon Valley Path follows the river between Salisbury and Christchurch.

== Rights of way ==
Canoeists seeking lawful passage as high as Salisbury have attempted to invoke the 1644 Navigation Act in their favour. However, the Act was subject to enabling works, most of which were never completed, hence the right is disputed. Responsibility for delivery was given to private undertakers in the names of Hodges, Bennett and Dennett, who were to fund the canalisation between the places. They were allowed to charge their investment at 10% interest rate and could take full commercial advantage, which tripartite agreements from 1684 and 1685 evidence. The House of Commons Journal of 31 January 1699 records that the freeholders, inhabitants and residents of Ibsley and Fordingbridge petitioned the House on the fact that they could not comply with the 1664 Act and were never likely to do so. The House sided with them and effectively declared its view of the law, the finality of which, lacking royal assent, the law of rights of way is unclear on but makes more likely the view that the Act became voidable as the works to canalise the Avon were never implemented. Indecisive court cases were brought in 1737 and 1772 to enforce the alleged but not exercised right (to benefit barge owners).

== Landowner's houses with parkland ==
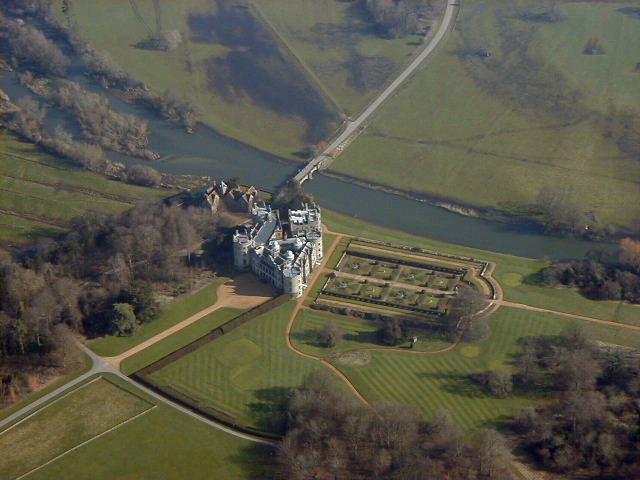
Longford Castle overlooks the river

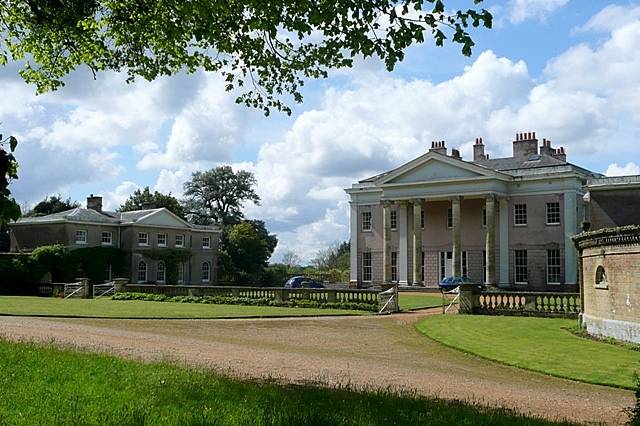
Hale Park

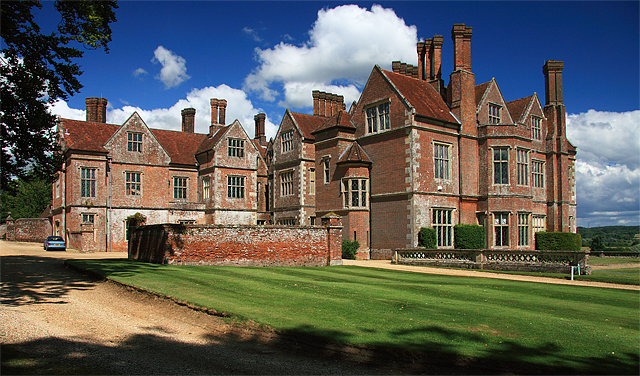
Breamore House

The valley from north to south has the following houses with large parks and gardens, significantly funded in their original form by the rich, mixed agriculture from the little-wooded upper valley plains and sides:

- Conock Manor, Chirton
- Amesbury Abbey
- Lake House, Wilsford
- Heale House, Middle Woodford
- Wilton House (including orangery, loggietta, whispering seat, classical bridges, follies, columns, Holbein porch, James Wyatt architecture)
- Longford Castle (including two listed bridges over the river, parterre, statues of fame and Diana)
- Trafalgar Park, Downton (including chapel)
- Hale Park (includes lodge, barns and granaries)
- Breamore House (includes tower, and museum cottage)
- Somerley (includes salmon huts, farmhouses and extensive water meadows)
- Avon Tyrrell House, Sopley (includes lodge and gazebo)

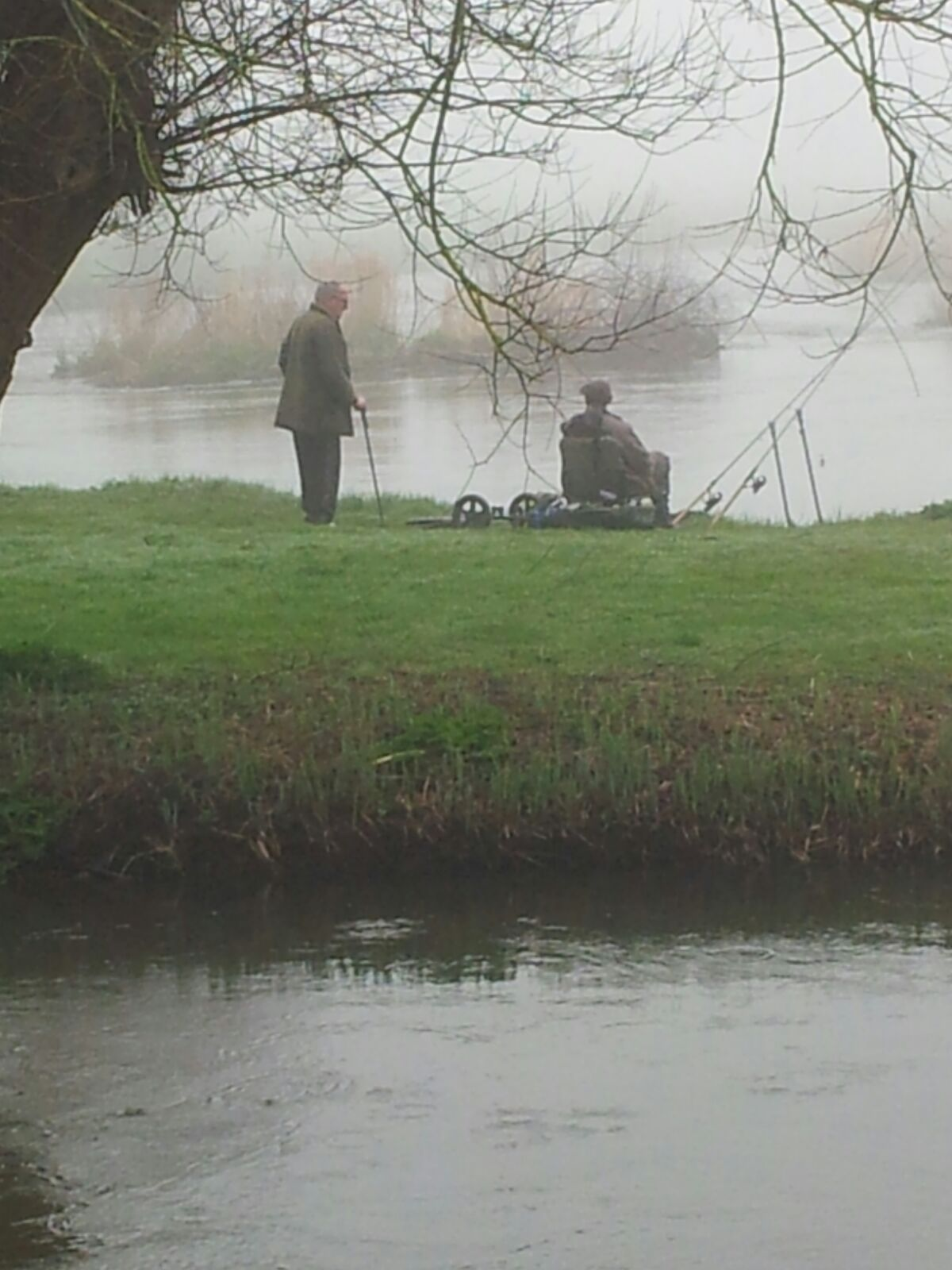
Anglers at the famous Royalty fishery, Christchurch, Dorset in March 2017

== Scheduled monument landscapes ==
The largest of this type is England's main World Heritage Site of this category, which includes Stonehenge.

Others include massive earthworks at Old Sarum, and across the larger, separate Thornham Down area.

== Settlements ==
=== Wiltshire ===
Upper Avon Valley

- Upavon
- East and West Chisenbury
- Enford
- Coombe
- Fittleton
- Haxton
- Netheravon
- Figheldean
- Milston
- Durrington
- Bulford
- Amesbury

Woodford Valley

- West Amesbury
- Wilsford cum Lake
- Great Durnford
- The Woodfords
- Little Durnford

Salisbury

- Stratford-sub-Castle
- Salisbury

Wiltshire watermeadows

- Britford
- Bodenham
- Charlton All Saints
- Downton

=== Hampshire ===
- Breamore
- Burgate
- Fordingbridge
- Bickton
- Ibsley
- Ringwood
- Sopley

=== Dorset ===
- St Ives
- Burton
- Fairmile
- Christchurch

== Designations ==
In 1993 the Avon valley in Hampshire between Bickton (downstream of Fordingbridge) and Christchurch was designated as a Site of Special Scientific Interest (SSSI).

In 1996 almost the entire river, from Patney (Wiltshire) to Christchurch, together with its tributaries the Wylye, Nadder, Bourne and Dockens Water, was designated as the River Avon System SSSI.

== Conservation initiatives in the 2000s ==
A four-year project called STREAM began in September 2005. This £1 million project was designed to benefit the habitats of species such as water-crowfoot, Atlantic salmon, brook lamprey, sea lamprey, bullhead, Desmoulin's whorl snail, gadwall and Cygnus columbianus (Bewick's swan). A sister project called Living River ran from 2006 to 2010, aiming to providing better access and recreation, as well as aid biodiversity. Both these projects were shortlisted for the 2009 Thiess International Riverprize, competing against four other projects: the Yellow River in China, Lake Simcoe in Canada, the Polochic Basin in Guatemala and the Lower Owens River in the USA. The prize for 2009 was awarded to Lake Simcoe.

== Angling ==
On 13 September 1934, Aylmer Tryon equalled the British record for barbel with a 14 lb 6 oz specimen caught from the Royalty stretch of the Hampshire Avon at Christchurch. Three years later in 1937, Mr F.W.K. Wallis caught a barbel of exactly the same weight, equalling the British record caught by Tryon three years earlier, and the barbel caught by Mr T. Wheeler in 1888 at Molesey Lock on the River Thames in Surrey in 1888. In 1968, all three of these records were expunged by the BRFC in favour of the 13 lb 12 barbel caught by Joe Day in October 1962 at the Royalty Fishery. Day's record stood for 32 years until being beaten by a 16 lb 2 oz barbel caught by Peter Woodhouse in June 1994 at the River Medway, Kent.

The British record for chub has been held three times at the Royalty, first by Mr E.J. Walker on 17 August 1904 with a chub of 7 lb 5 oz. This was beaten two years later with a chub of 7 lb 6 oz 8 dr by Mr F.W. Smith in October 1906. This chub record was smashed in December 1913 at the same venue by Mr G.F. Smith with a chub weighing 8 lb 4 oz, a record which stood for 38 years.

The largest ever dace caught in UK waters was 1 lb 8 oz 5 dr caught by R.W. Humphrey in 1932 at the Hampshire Avon in Dorset. As a British record it stood for 36 years until being expunged by the BRFC in 1968.

== See also ==
- Other Rivers Avon
- List of rivers of the United Kingdom
