= List of monastic houses in Wiltshire =

Locations of monastic houses in Wiltshire
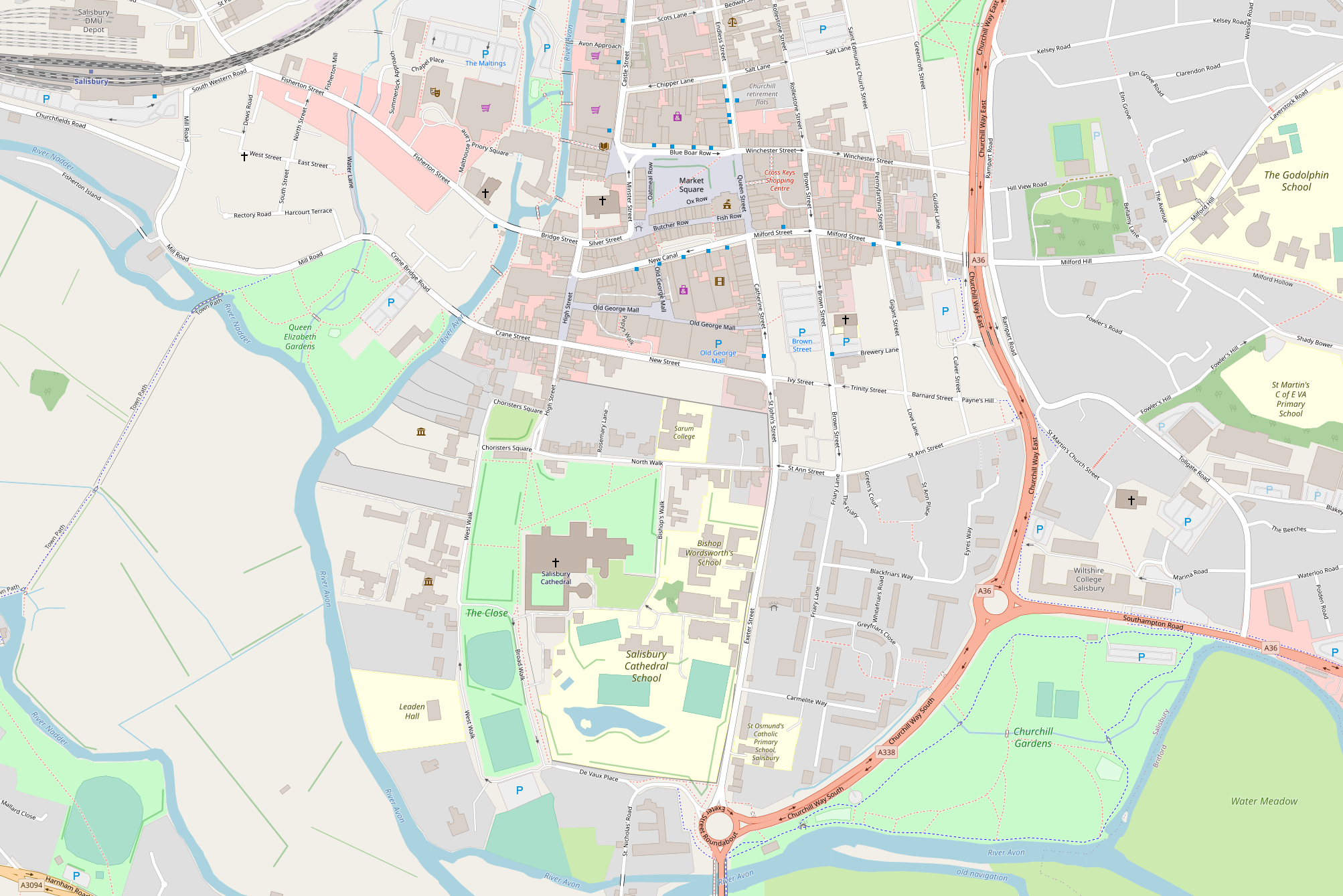
Locations of monastic houses in Salisbury

The following is a list of the monastic houses in Wiltshire, England.

Alien houses are included, as are smaller establishments such as cells and notable monastic granges (particularly those with resident monks), and also camerae of the military orders of monks (Knights Templar and Knights Hospitaller). Monastic hospitals are included where they had the status or function of an abbey, priory, or preceptor/commandery.

Abbreviations and key

Status of remains
Symbol	Status
None	Ruins
*	Current monastic function
^{+}	Current non-monastic ecclesiastic function (including remains incorporated into later structure)
^	Current non-ecclesiastic function (including remains incorporated into later structure) or redundant intact structure
^{$}	Remains limited to earthworks etc.
^{#}	No identifiable trace of the monastic foundation remains
^{~}	Exact site of monastic foundation unknown
^{≈}	Identification ambiguous or confused

Locations with names in italics indicate possible duplication (misidentification with another location) or non-existent foundations (either erroneous reference or proposed foundation never implemented) or ecclesiastical establishments with a monastic name but lacking actual monastic connection.

Trusteeship
EH	English Heritage
LT	Landmark Trust
NT	National Trust

== List ==
Foundation	Image	Communities & provenance	Formal name or dedication & alternative names	References & location
Amesbury Abbey		tradition of early monastery destroyed 6th century; Benedictine nuns abbey founded c.979 by Alfrida, widow of King Edwin; Fontevrault Benedictine nuns alien house: dependent on Fontevrault; refounded 1177; Henry II obtained papal consent, abbess pensioned and nuns apparently expelled to other houses 1177, being replaced by nuns from Fontevrault and Westwood; Fontevrault Benedictine nuns and brothers double house priors recorded from 1194; became denizen: independent from sometime after 1403; dissolved 1539; granted to Edward, Earl of Hertford 1540/1; hypothesis that the current parish church was the church of the brethren, possibly built on the site of the early minster	Abbey of St Mary and St Melor (c.979) ____________________; Amesbury Priory	51°10′28″N 1°47′08″W
Ansty Preceptory ^^{(?)}		Knights Hospitaller founded c.1220, manor granted by William de Turberville (Tubelville) 1210–1; dissolved 1540; granted to J. Zouch 1546/7; in use as a hospice after dissolution; badly damaged by fire 1927; converted into an engineering workshop; remains possibly incorporated into farmhouse at Manor Farm		51°02′11″N 2°03′50″W
Avebury Priory		Benedictine monks alien house: cell dependent on St-Georges, Bocherville; founded after 1114 by William de Tancarville (Tancervilla); dissolved 1378; granted to Winchester College 1391; granted to Sir William Sharington 1548/9; manor house named Avebury Manor built on site c.1557		51°25′44″N 1°51′32″W
Bradenstoke Priory		Augustinian Canons Regular founded c.1139 (1142) by Walter D'Evereaux; dissolved 17 January 1539; granted to Richard Pexhall 1546/7; remains within farmstead named 'Bradenstoke Abbey'	Clack Priory	51°30′44″N 2°00′07″W
Bradford-on-Avon Monastery		Benedictine? monks founded c.705–710 by St Aldhelm, Bishop of Sherborne; granted to Shaftesbury, Dorset 1001; served as charnel house in medieval period; in use as a dwelling and a school 18th to mid-19th century; restored 1870; church now in ownership of the Wiltshire Archaeological Society	St Lawrence	51°20′49″N 2°15′14″W
Briontune Priory		Augustinian Canons Regular (Note: Briontune/Brioptune - cited by Speed and Gervase of Canterbury; Tanner, Notitia Monastica, 609, indicates the county has no location of this name)	St Mary Magdalene ____________________; Brioptune Priory	
Britford Monastery (?)		possible Saxon community		
Bromham Monastery		uncertain order and foundation		
Calne Monastery (?)		possible Saxon community		
Charlton Priory		Premonstratensian Canons alien house: dependent on L'Isle-Dieu, Normandy founded c.1187, granted to L'Isle-Dieu by Reginald de Pavely; dissolved 1380; granted to the Hospital of St Katherine-by-the-Tower granted to Sir William Sharington 1548/9	Charleton Priory	51°18′11″N 1°50′37″W
Clatford Priory		Benedictine monks alien house: cell dependent on St-Victor-en-Caux; founded after 1104; manors granted by Hugh, son of Ralph de Mortimer; dissolved c.1439; granted to Eton College 1441	Clatford and Hullavington Priory	51°24′39″N 1°47′08″W
Corsham Priory ^{+}		possibly late Saxon minster; St Bartholomew's church granted to St-Etienne, Caen by William the Conqueror; Benedictine monks alien house: cell dependent on Marmoutier; founded before 1077, granted to Marmoutier between 1068 and 1135 (during the reign of Henry I); dissolved 1294; administered by the Cluniacs at Tickford, ceasing as a priory, granted to King's College, Cambridge by Henry VI; granted to Syon Abbey by Edward VI; granted to Philip Moore 1608/9; restored by G. E. Street and C. F. Hansom 1875–8	Cosham Priory	51°26′02″N 2°10′56″W
Cricklade Monastery (?)		possible Saxon monks or secular community	St Sampson	
Damerham Monastery	Historical county location. See entry under List of monastic houses in Hampshire			
Easton Priory or Hospital, Easton Royal ^{~}		Trinitarian hostel founded 1245 by Stephen of Tisbury, Archdeacon of Salisbury; priory founded 1251, priory church serving as both conventual and parochial; destroyed by fire 1493; apparently restored buildings were reported as in a ruinous state at dissolution; dissolved 1536; granted to Sir Edward Seymour, Viscount Beauchamp 1536; granted to Edward, Earl of Hertford 1608/9; present parish church possibly stands on or near the site of the conventual church	Eston Friary	51°20′32″N 1°42′15″W (possible)
Edington Priory ^{+}		manor granted to the nuns at Romsey by King Edgar between 959 and 975; present church built as a chantry chapel 1351 by William Edington, Bishop of Winchester on site of earlier church; Bonshommes brothers (Note: Edington – affiliation cited by Discovering Abbeys & Priories, Geoffrey N. Wright and Victoria County History as being one of the only two Bonshommes establishments in England) church granted to the Bonshommes 1358 as their priory church, nave reserved for parochial use; dissolved 1539; granted to William Pawlet, Lord St John 1541/2; conventual church, restored 1881–91, now in parochial use as All Saints' parish church; house named 'The Priory' possibly incorporates remains of the claustral buildings	St Mary, St Catherine and All Saints ____________________; All Saints' Church; Edindon Priory	51°16′44″N 2°06′25″W
Fisherton Anger Friary		Dominican Friars (community founded 1245 at Fugglestone); transferred here 1281; dissolved 1538		
Fugglestone Priory		Dominican Friars founded 1245; transferred to Fisherton Anger 1281 and thereafter retained as a cell until dissolution; dissolved 1538; apparently converted to domestic use when recorded early-19th century, when at least partly extant		51°04′55″N 1°51′20″W
Great Bedwyn Monastery (?)		apparent Saxon minster community 10th century, purported traces to the east of present parish church of St Mary, which is possibly on or near site of the Saxon foundation	St Lawrence	51°22′37″N 1°36′09″W (possible)
Hullavington Grange (?)		Benedictine monks founded 1104; dissolved after 1325		
Ivychurch Priory		Saxon minster apparently established as priory church; Augustinian Canons Regular founded before 1154 by King Stephen (Note: Ivychurch - founder cited by Hundred Rolls, 1274); dissolved 1536	The Blessed Virgin Mary	51°02′53″N 1°44′26″W
Kington St Michael Priory		Benedictine nuns founded before 1155, probably by the family of Robert Wayfer de Brinton who granted land; dissolved 1536; granted to Sir John Long 1538/9; site now within farm	The Priory Church of St Mary, Kington St Michael ____________________; Keinton Priory	51°29′57″N 2°09′18″W
Lacock Abbey		Augustinian Canonesses priory founded 1230-2 by Ela, Countess of Salisbury, widow of William Longspée, confirmed 1320; raised to abbey status 1239–40 dissolved 21 January 1539; granted to Sir William Sharington 1540/1; (NT)	The Abbey Church of the Blessed Virgin Mary and Saint Bernard, Lacock	51°24′52″N 2°07′02″W
Longleat Priory		Augustinian Canons Regular founded before 1233 dissolved 1529; granted to Sir John Thynne 1540/1; country house named 'Longleat House' built on site		51°11′09″N 2°16′28″W
Loxwell Abbey ^{#}		Cistercian monks dependent on Quarr, Isle of Wight founded 1151 by Empress Matilda, her son Henry and her chamberlain Drogo; dissolved 1154; transferred to Stanley		51°25′40″N 2°04′09″W
Maiden Bradley Priory		originally a Lazer House founded 1152 (before 1164) by Manasser Biset; hospital for leper women in the care of secular brothers and priests; Augustinian Canons Regular founded 1184: granted by Bishop Hubert 1183–93 (Note: Maiden Bradley - cited by Leland, Itinerary (ed. T. L. Smith (1910))); priory founded before 1201 (Note: Maiden Bradley - earliest contemporary record of a prior 1201: D. Knowles & N. Hadcock, Medieval Religious Houses: England & Wales, (1971), p.165); dissolved 1536; granted to Sir Edward Seymore 1537/8	The Hospital and Priory Church of the Blessed Virgin Mary and Saint Lazarus, Maiden Bradley ____________________; Mayden Bradeley Priory	51°09′44″N 2°17′20″W
Malmesbury Abbey		British nuns (legendary) purportedly founded before 603 (7th century); dissolved by St Austin, Archbishop, in, or before, 604; hermitage of Irish monk and hermit Mailduib possibly 637; succeeded by St Aldhelm who built larger church of Our Saviour, SS Peter and Paul after 675; Benedictine? monks founded c.675; secular canons collegiate founded after 796; Benedictine monks founded before 965(−74) (675); destroyed in raids by the Danes 1010; soon rebuilt; refounded before 1143 by William of Malmesbury; dissolved 15 December 1539; granted to William Stump 1544/5; church now in parochial use	Our Saviour, Saint Peter and Saint Paul, Malmesbury (after 675) St Mary, Virgin (before 1143)	51°35′05″N 2°05′54″W
Marlborough Priory		Gilbertine canons founded before 1189(?) possibly by Henry II; plundered and partly destroyed by fire 1337 dissolved January 1539; granted to Anthony Stringer;	The Priory Church of Saint Margaret, Marlborough ____________________; Marleburgh Abbey	51°25′05″N 1°43′27″W
Marlborough Whitefriars		Carmelite Friars founded c.1316 by John Godwin and William Ramesbesch (Rammeshulle): licence granted 1 January 1316 for William de Rammeshulle to grant land; dilapidated at time of suppression; dissolved 1538; granted to John Pye and Robert Brown 1542/3; demolished 1820; fragments purportedly used in a house named 'the Priory'	Marleburgh Whitefriars	51°25′10″N 1°43′54″W
Monkton Farleigh Priory		Cluniac monks alien house: dependent on Lewes, Sussex; projected by Humphrey de Bohun, probably founded 1120–1123 by his son Humphrey III and wife Maud, confirmed by Hugh, Prior of Lewes; became denizen: independent from sometime during 1373–4; dissolved 1536; granted to Sir Edward Seymore 1536/7; remains incorporated into house built on site 16th century	St Mary Magdalene ____________________; Farleigh Priory	51°23′20″N 2°16′47″W
Netheravon Monastery (?)		documentary and physical suggestion of pre-Conquest monastic community		
Ogbourne Priory		Benedictine monks alien house: dependent on Bec-Hellouin; founded 1149 (before 1147), granted to Bec by Matilda de Wallingford with the assent of Henry, Duke of the Normans, and his mother Empress Matilda; granted to the Duke of Bedford 1404–5; dissolved 1414; spiritualities transferred to Windsor College 1421; other possessions divided and granted to King's College, Cambridge and Eton College, the London Charterhouse and other establishments	Ogbourne Saint George Priory	51°27′53″N 1°43′40″W
Poulton Priory	Former county location. See entry under List of monastic houses in Gloucestershire			
Rockley Preceptory		Knights Templar founded 1155-6 by John Mareschall; dissolved 1308–12; Knights Hospitaller manor or camera and chapel; dissolved 1541; granted to Sir Thomas Stroude, Walter Erle and John Paget 1544/5	Temple Rockley Preceptory	51°26′49″N 1°48′52″W
Salisbury Blackfriars		Dominican Friars (under the Visitation of London) (community founded 1245 at Wilton) transferred here 1281; dissolved 1538; granted to John Pollard and William Byrte 1544/5		51°04′10″N 1°47′57″W
Salisbury Greyfriars		Franciscan Friars Minor, Conventual (under the Custody of London) founded before 1230; dissolved 1538; granted to John Wroth 1544/5		51°03′53″N 1°47′30″W
Stanley Abbey		Cistercian monks (community founded at Loxwell 1151); transferred here 1154 by Henry II; largely rebuilt 13th century; dissolved 1536; granted to Sir Edward Bainton 1536/7	Stanlegh Abbey	51°26′59″N 2°03′17″W
Stratton St Margaret Priory (?) (Note: Stratton St Margaret - listed by Dugdale, Monasticon Anglicanum; Tanner, Notitia Monastica annotates quaere ('query'))		Benedictine monks alien house granted to King's College, Cambridge by Henry VI		
Tisbury Monastery		Saxon Benedictine? monks, possible minster founded before 710; dissolved after 759 land granted to Shaftesbury 984 (983), confirmed by King Ethelred; parish church of St John the Baptist, built 1180–1200, possibly stands on site		51°03′44″N 2°04′53″W
Tisbury Grange		Benedictine nuns grange dependent on Shaftesbury; Place Farm currently occupies the site		51°03′44″N 2°04′53″W
Upavon Priory		land and churches at Upavon and Sheraton held by St-Wandrille 1086; Benedictine monks alien house: cell dependent on St-Wandrille; founded before 1086: land held by Domesday Survey (Note: Upavon - Victoria County History: A History of the County of Wiltshire: Volume 2, p.119); cell founded by 12th century; dissolved before 1414; granted to Ivychurch 1423; granted to Francis and A. Anderson 1606/7	Uphaven Priory	51°17′42″N 1°48′24″W
Wilton Abbey		church of St Mary founded by Weohstan, Ealdorman of Wiltshire; nuns founded c.830 (or 773), according to tradition, by petition of Weohstan's widow, Alburga, to King Egbert, to convert church of St Mary into a nunnery refounded 890; refounded 934; Benedictine nuns refounded before 970; destroyed by Sweyn 1003; rebuilt in stone by Edith, wife of Edward the Confessor, consecrated 1065; dissolved 25 March 1539; granted to Sir William Herbert 1543/4; conventual church and buildings demolished; outlying medieval building named 'the Almonry' remains; house named 'Wilton House' built on site.	St Mary and St Bartholomew St Mary, St Bartholomew and St Edith (after 987)	51°04′42″N 1°51′33″W
Wilton Blackfriars		Dominican Friars (under the Visitation of London) founded 1245; dissolved 1281: transferred to Salisbury and thereafter probably only a vicarial house until 1538		51°04′42″N 1°51′33″W

== See also ==
- List of monastic houses in England
- Wilton Priory
