= Catherine Seymour =

Catherine Seymour may refer to:

- Catherine Seymour, born Catherine Parr, Queen of England
- Catherine Seymour, born Lady Catherine Grey (1540–1568), sister of Lady Jane Grey, claimant to the throne of England
- Catherine Seymour, born Catherine Filliol, wife of Edward Seymour, 1st Duke of Somerset
