= Edward Seymour, 1st Duke of Somerset =

Lord Protector of England from 1547 to 1549

His Grace The Duke of Somerset KG PC
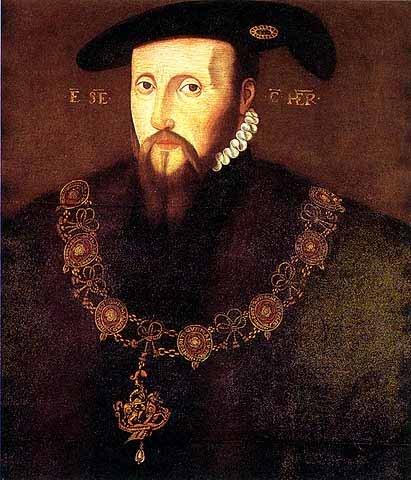
- Portrait of Edward Seymour as 1st Earl of Hertford (cr 1537)

Lord High Treasurer
- In office 10 February 1547 – 10 October 1549
- Monarch: Edward VI
- Preceded by: Thomas Howard, 3rd Duke of Norfolk
- Succeeded by: William Paulet, 1st Marquess of Winchester

Lord Protector of the Realm
- In office 4 February 1547 – 11 October 1549
- Monarch: Edward VI

Lord Great Chamberlain
- In office c.1543–c.1549
- Monarchs: Henry VIII; Edward VI
- Preceded by: Robert Radcliffe, 1st Earl of Sussex
- Succeeded by: John Dudley, 1st Earl of Warwick

Personal details
- Born: 1500
- Died: 22 January 1552 (aged 51–52) Tower Hill, London
- Cause of death: Decapitation
- Resting place: Chapel Royal of St. Peter ad Vincula, Tower of London, London, United Kingdom; 51.508611°N 0.076944°W
- Spouses: Catherine Fillol; Anne Stanhope
- Children: with Catherine: John Seymour; Lord Edward Seymour; with Anne: Edward Seymour, Viscount Beauchamp of Hache; Lady Anne Seymour; Edward Seymour, 1st Earl of Hertford, and 7 others ...
- Parents: Sir John Seymour; Margery Wentworth

Military service
- Allegiance: Kingdom of England
- Battles/wars: French wars, 1522–1524; The Rough Wooing; Burning of Edinburgh; Siege of Boulogne, 1544; Battle of Pinkie; Prayer Book Rebellion; Kett's Rebellion

Edward Seymour, 1st Duke of Somerset, 1st Earl of Hertford, 1st Viscount Beauchamp (1500 – 22 January 1552) was an English nobleman and politician who served as Lord Protector of England from 1547 to 1549 during the minority of his nephew King Edward VI. He was the eldest surviving brother of Queen Jane Seymour, the third wife of King Henry VIII and mother of King Edward VI.

Seymour grew rapidly in favour with Henry VIII following Jane's marriage to the king in 1536, and was subsequently made Earl of Hertford. On Henry's death in 1547, he was appointed protector by the Regency Council on the accession of the nine-year-old Edward VI. Rewarded with the title Duke of Somerset, Seymour became the effective ruler of England. Somerset continued Henry's military campaign against the Scots and achieved a sound victory at the Battle of Pinkie, but ultimately he was unable to maintain his position in Scotland. Domestically, Somerset pursued further reforms as an extension of the English Reformation, and in 1549 imposed the first Book of Common Prayer through the Act of Uniformity, offering a compromise between Protestant and Roman Catholic teachings. The unpopularity of Somerset's religious measures, along with agrarian grievances, resulted in unrest in England and provoked a series of uprisings (including the Prayer Book Rebellion and Kett's Rebellion). Costly wars and economic mismanagement brought the Crown to financial ruin, further undermining his government.

In October 1549, Somerset was forced out of power and imprisoned in the Tower of London by John Dudley, Earl of Warwick, and a group of privy councillors. He was later released and reconciled with Warwick (now Duke of Northumberland), but in 1551 Northumberland accused him of treason, and he was executed in January 1552. Until the 1970s historians had a highly positive view of Somerset, seeing him as a champion of political liberty and the common people, but since then he has also often been portrayed as an arrogant and inept ruler of the Tudor state.

== Origins and early career ==
Edward Seymour was born c. 1500, the son of Sir John Seymour, feudal baron of Hatch Beauchamp in Somerset, with his wife Margery Wentworth, eldest daughter of Sir Henry Wentworth of Nettlestead, Suffolk, and descended from Edward III. In 1514, aged about 14, he received an appointment in the household of Mary Tudor, Queen of France, and was enfant d'honneur at her marriage with Louis XII.

Seymour served in the Duke of Suffolk's campaign in France in 1523, being knighted by the duke on 1 November, and accompanied Cardinal Wolsey on his embassy to France in 1527. Appointed Esquire of the Body to Henry VIII in 1529, he grew in favour with the king, who visited his manor at Elvetham in Hampshire in October 1535. Through his marriage to Catherine Fillol he became the owner of Woodmancote Place, Sussex.

== Rise under Henry VIII ==
When Seymour's sister, Jane, married King Henry VIII in 1536, Edward was created Viscount Beauchamp on 5 June 1536, and Earl of Hertford on 15 October 1537. He became Warden of the Scottish Marches and continued in royal favour after his sister's death on 24 October 1537.

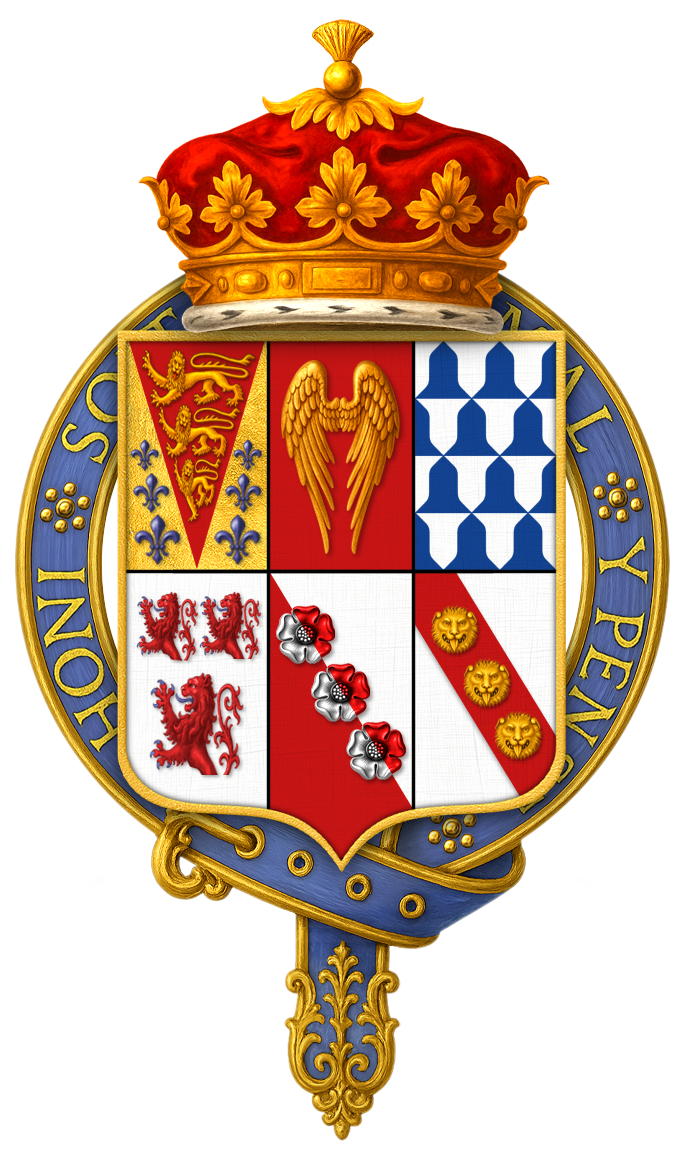
Quartered arms of Edward Seymour, 1st Duke of Somerset, KG: Quarterly of six. 1. Or, on a pile, gules, between six fleurs de lys, azure three lions of England. (Augmentation granted by Henry VIII on his marriage to Jane Seymour). 2. Seymour: gules, two wings conjoined in lure, or. 3. Beauchamp of Hache: Vair. 4. Esturmy: Argent, three demi-lions rampant, gules. 5. MacWilliams: Per bend, argent and gules, three roses, bend-wise, counterchanged. 6. Coker: Argent, on a bend, gules, three leopards' heads, or.

In 1541, during Henry's absence in the north, Hertford, Thomas Cranmer and Thomas Audley had the chief management of affairs in London. In September 1542 he was appointed Warden of the Scottish Marches, and a few months later Lord High Admiral, a post which he almost immediately relinquished in favour of John Dudley, the future duke of Northumberland. In March 1544 he was made lieutenant-general of the north and instructed to punish the Scots for their repudiation of the treaty of marriage between Prince Edward and the infant Mary, Queen of Scots. He landed at Leith on 3 May 1544, captured and pillaged Edinburgh, and returned by land burning villages and castles along the way.

In July 1544 he was appointed lieutenant of the realm under Catherine Parr, Henry's sixth wife and regent, during Henry's absence at Boulogne, but in August he joined the king and was present at the surrender of the town. In the autumn he was one of the commissioners sent to Flanders to keep Emperor Charles V to the terms of his treaty with England, and in January 1545 he was placed in command at Boulogne, where on the 26th he repelled an attempt of Marshal de Biez to recapture the town. In May he was once more appointed lieutenant-general in the north to avenge the Scottish victory at the Battle of Ancrum Moor; this he did by a savage foray into Scotland in September. He reported that on 16 September 1545 he had "sent forth a good band to the number of 1500 light horsemen in the leading of me [and] Sir Robert Bowes, which from 5 a.m. till 3 p.m., forayed along the waters of Tyvyote and Rowle, 6 or 7 miles beyond Jedburgh, and burnt 14 or 15 towns and a great quantity of all kinds of corn".

In March 1546 he was sent back to Boulogne to supersede the Earl of Surrey, whose command had not been a success; and in June he was engaged in negotiations for peace with France and for the delimitation of the English conquests.

From October to the end of Henry's reign he was in attendance on the king, engaged in the struggle for predominance which was to determine the complexion of the government during the coming minority. Personal, political and religious rivalry separated him and Baron Lisle from the Howards, and Surrey's hasty temper precipitated his own ruin and that of his father, the duke of Norfolk. They could not acquiesce in the Imperial ambassador's verdict that Hertford and Lisle were the only noblemen of fit age and capacity to carry on the government; and Surrey's attempt to secure the predominance of his family led to his own execution and to his father's imprisonment in the Tower of London.

== Seymour's Protectorate ==
=== Council of Regency ===
Arms of Edward Seymour, 1st Duke of Somerset: Quarterly, 1st and 4th: Or, on a pile gules between six fleurs-de-lys azure three lions of England (special grant); 2nd and 3rd: Gules, two wings conjoined in lure or (Seymour) These arms concede the positions of greatest honour, the 1st & 4th quarters, to a special grant of arms incorporating the fleurs-de-lys and lions of the royal arms of Plantagenet

Upon the death of Henry VIII (28 January 1547), Seymour's nephew became king as Edward VI. Henry VIII's will named sixteen executors, who were to act as Edward's Council until he reached the age of 18. These executors were supplemented by twelve men "of counsail" who would assist the executors when called on. The final state of Henry VIII's will has occasioned controversy. Some historians suggest that those close to the king manipulated either him or the will itself to ensure a shareout of power to their benefit, both material and religious. In this reading, the composition of the Privy Chamber shifted towards the end of 1546 in favour of the Protestant faction. In addition, two leading conservative Privy Councillors were removed from the centre of power. Stephen Gardiner was refused access to Henry during his last months. Thomas Howard, 3rd Duke of Norfolk, found himself accused of treason; on 24–25 December, he offered his vast estates to the Crown making them available for redistribution, and he spent the whole of Edward's reign in the Tower of London.

Other historians have argued that Gardiner's exclusion had non-religious causes, that Norfolk was not noticeably conservative in religion, that conservatives remained on the council, and that the radicalism of men such as Sir Anthony Denny, who controlled the dry stamp that replicated the king's signature, is debatable. Whatever the case, Henry's death was followed by a lavish hand-out of lands and honours to the new power group. The will contained an "unfulfilled gifts" clause, added at the last minute, which allowed Henry's executors to freely distribute lands and honours to themselves and the court, particularly to Seymour (then known as Earl of Hertford), who became the Lord Protector of the Realm and Governor of the King's Person, and who created himself Duke of Somerset.

Henry VIII's will did not provide for the appointment of a Protector. It entrusted the government of the realm during his son's minority to a Regency Council that would rule collectively, by majority decision, with "like and equal charge". Nevertheless, a few days after Henry's death, on 4 February, the executors chose to invest almost regal power in Edward Seymour. Thirteen out of the sixteen (the others being absent) agreed to his appointment as Protector, which they justified as their joint decision "by virtue of the authority" of Henry's will. Seymour may have done a deal with some of the executors, who almost all received hand-outs; he is known to have done so with William Paget, private secretary to Henry VIII, and to have secured the support of Sir Anthony Browne of the Privy Chamber.

Seymour's appointment was in keeping with historical precedent, and his eligibility for the role was reinforced by his military successes in Scotland and France. He was senior to his ally Lisle in the peerage, and was the new king's closest relative.

In March 1547, he secured letters patent from King Edward granting him the almost monarchical right to appoint members to the Privy Council himself and to consult them only when he wished. In the words of historian G. R. Elton, "from that moment his autocratic system was complete". He proceeded to rule largely by proclamation, calling on the Privy Council to do little more than rubber-stamp his decisions.

Seymour's takeover of power was smooth and efficient. The imperial ambassador Francis van der Delft reported that he "governs everything absolutely", with Paget operating as his secretary, although he predicted trouble from John Dudley, Viscount Lisle, who had recently been raised to Earl of Warwick in the share-out of honours. In fact, in the early weeks of his Protectorate, Seymour met opposition only from the Lord Chancellor, Thomas Wriothesley, whom the Earldom of Southampton had evidently failed to buy off, and from his own brother. Wriothesley, a religious conservative, objected to Seymour's assumption of monarchical power over the council. He then found himself abruptly dismissed from the chancellorship on charges of selling off some of his offices to delegates.

In his first parliament, which met in November 1547, Seymour procured the repeal of all the heresy laws and nearly all the treason laws passed since Edward III. He sought to win over the Scots by those promises of autonomy, free trade, and equal privileges with England. But the Scots were not to be won over yet, and would not be persuaded; the protector led another army into Scotland in September 1547, and won the Battle of Pinkie Cleugh on 10 September. He trusted the garrisons he established throughout the Lowlands to wear down Scottish opposition, but their pressure was soon weakened by troubles in England and abroad; and Mary, Queen of Scots, having been betrothed to Francis, heir to the French throne, was transported to France in 1548, where the two married ten years later.

To deal with the widespread social problems in England, Seymour introduced the Vagabonds Act 1547, which dictated that able-bodied men who were unemployed for three days or more should be sold into slavery for two years. This law was deeply unpopular and turned many people against him, particularly local officials who were blamed for enforcing the Act.

Seymour also attempted to bring uniformity to forms of worship, and in 1549 the first Act of Uniformity introduced a Book of Common Prayer that attempted to compromise between different teachings; it was replaced by a more severe form in 1552, after his fall. Prior to and during the Protectorate, the Book of Common Prayer was a central element of the emerging Protestant literature.

=== Thomas Seymour ===
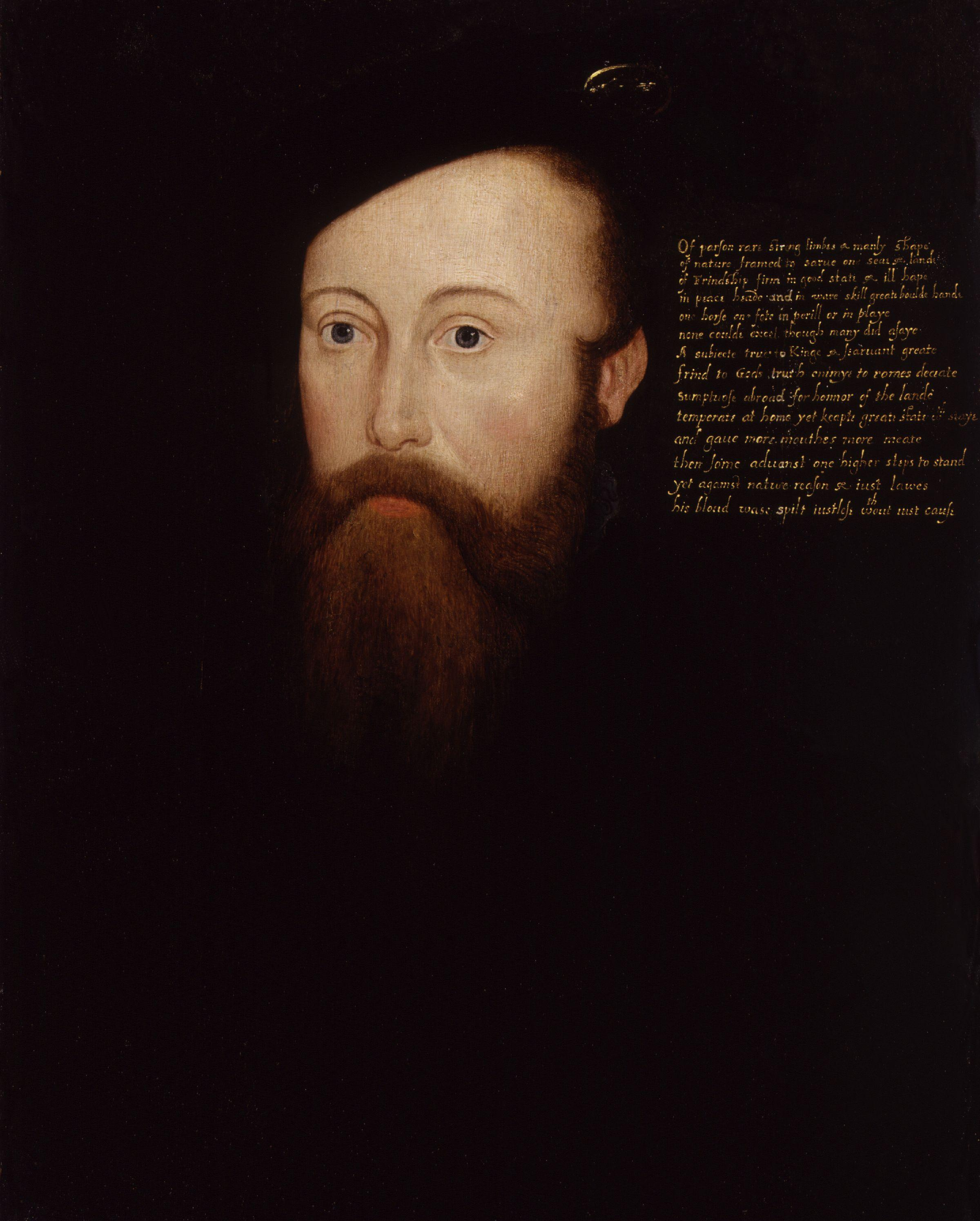
Thomas Seymour, Lord Admiral and brother of Edward Seymour

Edward Seymour faced less manageable opposition from his younger brother Thomas, who has been described as a "worm in the bud". As King Edward's uncle, Thomas Seymour demanded the governorship of the king's person and a greater share of power. Seymour tried to buy his brother off with a barony, an appointment to the Lord Admiralship, and a seat on the Privy Council—but Thomas was bent on scheming for power. He began smuggling pocket money to King Edward, telling him that the Duke of Somerset held the purse strings too tight, making him a "beggarly king". He also urged him to throw off the Protector within two years and "bear rule as other kings do"; but Edward, schooled to defer to the council, failed to co-operate.

In April 1547, using King Edward's support to circumvent his brother's opposition, Thomas Seymour secretly married Henry VIII's widow Catherine Parr, whose Protestant household included the 11-year-old Lady Jane Grey and the 13-year-old Princess Elizabeth.

In summer 1548, a pregnant Catherine Parr discovered Thomas Seymour embracing Princess Elizabeth. As a result, Elizabeth was removed from Catherine Parr's household and transferred to that of Sir Anthony Denny. In that September, Catherine Parr died in childbirth, and Thomas Seymour promptly resumed his attentions to Elizabeth by letter, planning to marry her. Elizabeth was receptive, but, like Edward, unready to agree to anything unless permitted by the council. In January 1549, the council had Thomas Seymour arrested on various charges, including embezzlement at the Bristol mint. King Edward himself testified about the pocket money. Most importantly, Thomas Seymour had sought to officially receive the governorship of King Edward, for no earlier Lord Protectors, unlike Edward Seymour, had ever held both functions. Lack of clear evidence for treason ruled out a trial, so Thomas was condemned instead by an Act of Attainder and beheaded on 20 March 1549.

=== War ===
Edward Seymour's only undoubted skill was as a soldier, which he had proved on his expeditions to Scotland and in the defence of Boulogne in 1546. From the first, his main interest as Protector was the war against Scotland. After a crushing victory at the Battle of Pinkie in September 1547, he set up a network of garrisons in Scotland, stretching as far north as Dundee. His initial successes, however, were followed by a loss of direction. His aim of uniting the realms through conquest became increasingly unrealistic. The Scots allied with France, who sent reinforcements for the defence of Edinburgh in 1548, while Mary, Queen of Scots, was removed to France, where she was betrothed to the dauphin. The cost of maintaining the Protector's massive armies and his permanent garrisons in Scotland also placed an unsustainable burden on the royal finances. A French attack on Boulogne in August 1549 at last forced Seymour to begin a withdrawal from Scotland.

=== Rebellion ===
During 1548, England was subject to social unrest. After April 1549, a series of armed revolts broke out, fuelled by various religious and agrarian grievances. The two most serious rebellions required major military intervention to put down: one was in Devon and Cornwall, the other in Norfolk. The first, called the Prayer Book Rebellion (and also known as the Western rebellion), arose mainly from the imposition of church services in English; the second, led by a tradesman called Robert Kett, mainly from the encroachment of landlords on common grazing ground. A complex aspect of the social unrest was that the protestors believed they were acting legitimately against enclosing landlords with the Protector's support, convinced that the landlords were the lawbreakers.

The same justification for outbreaks of unrest was voiced throughout the country, not only in Norfolk and the west. The origin of the popular view of Edward Seymour as sympathetic to the rebel cause lies partly in his series of sometimes liberal, often contradictory, proclamations, and partly in the uncoordinated activities of the commissions he sent out in 1548 and 1549 to investigate grievances about loss of tillage, encroachment of large sheep flocks on common land, and similar issues. Seymour's commissions were led by the evangelical M.P. John Hales, whose socially liberal rhetoric linked the issue of enclosure with Reformation theology and the notion of a godly commonwealth. Local groups often assumed that the findings of these commissions entitled them to act against offending landlords themselves. King Edward wrote in his Chronicle that the 1549 risings began "because certain commissions were sent down to pluck down enclosures".

Whatever the popular view of the Duke of Somerset, the disastrous events of 1549 were taken as evidence of a colossal failure of government, and the Council laid the responsibility at the Protector's door. In July 1549, Paget wrote to Seymour: "Every man of the council have misliked your proceedings ... would to God, that, at the first stir you had followed the matter hotly, and caused justice to be ministered in solemn fashion to the terror of others ...".

=== Fall from power ===
The sequence of events that led to Seymour's removal from power has often been called a coup d'état. By 1 October 1549, Seymour had been alerted that his rule faced a serious threat. He issued a proclamation calling for assistance, took possession of the king's person, and withdrew for safety to the fortified Windsor Castle, where Edward said, "Methinks I am in prison".

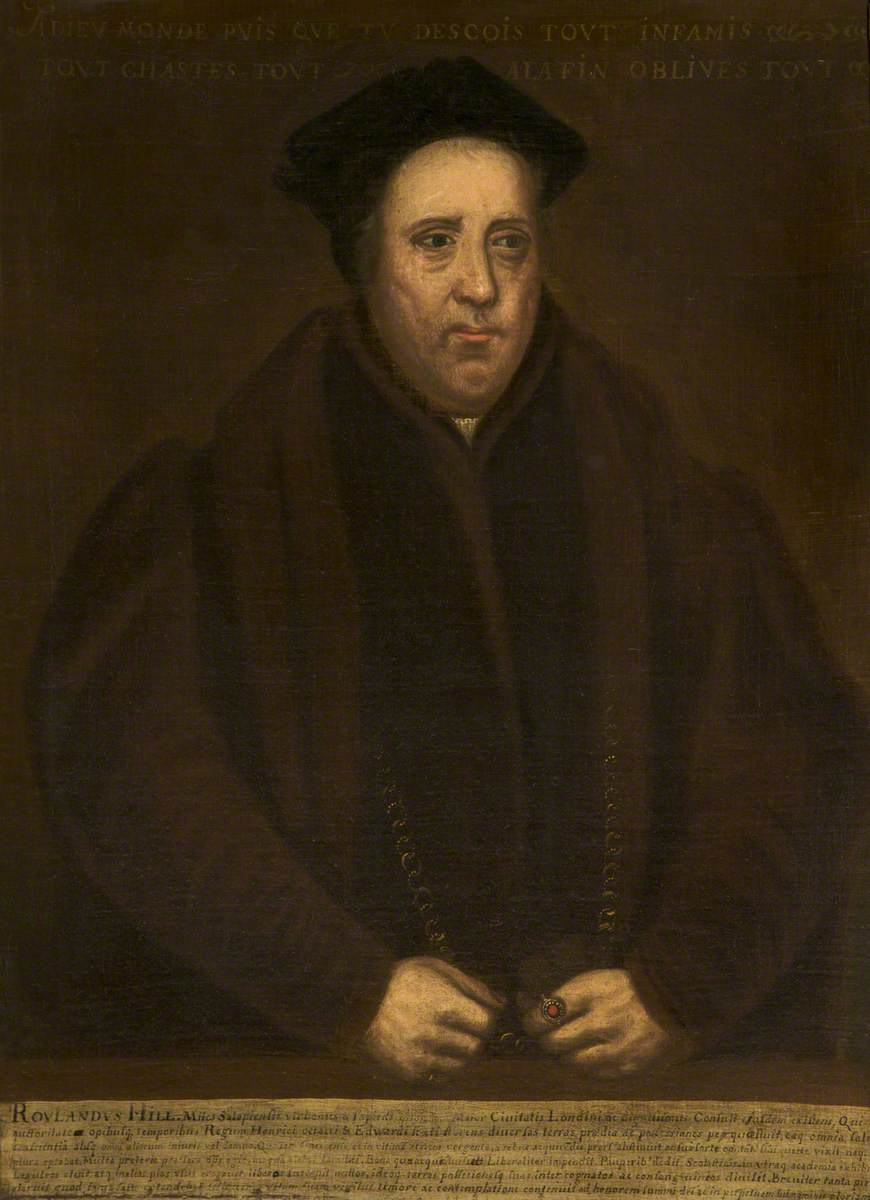
One of Somerset's last desperate acts as Lord Protector was to request 1,000 troops from Sir Rowland Hill as Lord Mayor of London. Hill did not send assistance.

By 7 October he was writing desperately to Sir Rowland Hill, Lord Mayor of London, and a fellow member of the Privy Council requesting 1000 troops to defend him and the King. By this point a meeting had already been had between Hill and London representatives with John Dudley, then Earl of Warwick at Ely Palace. That meeting moved decisively against Somerset.

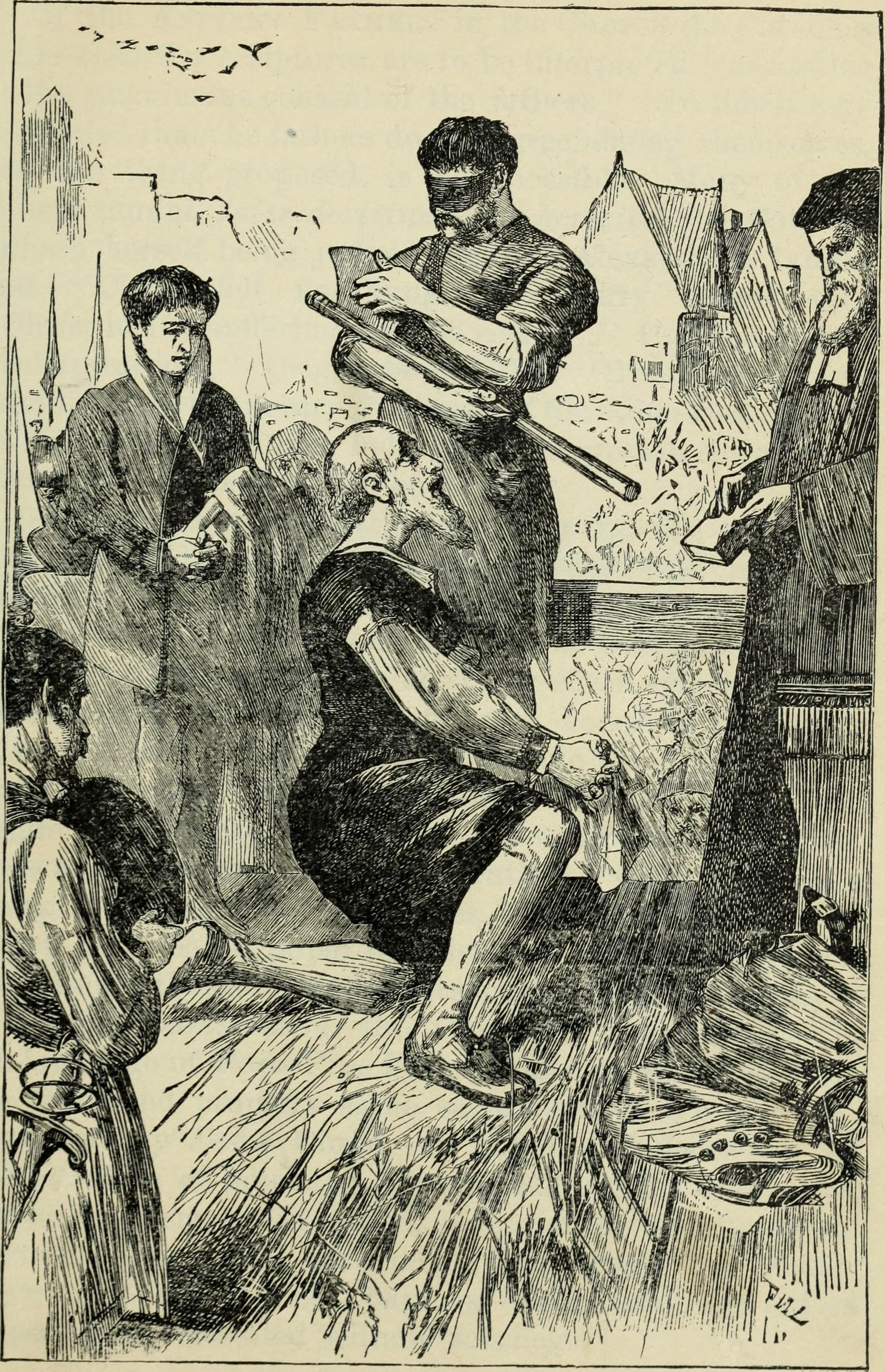
Execution of the Duke of Somerset, from a 19th-century book

Meanwhile, a united Council published details of Seymour's mismanagement of government. They made clear that the Protector's power came from them, not from Henry VIII's will. On 11 October, the council had Seymour arrested and brought the king to Richmond. Edward summarised the charges against Somerset in his Chronicle: "ambition, vainglory, entering into rash wars in mine youth, negligent looking on Newhaven, enriching himself of my treasure, following his own opinion, and doing all by his own authority, etc."

In February 1550, John Dudley, Earl of Warwick, emerged as the leader of the Council and, in effect, as Seymour's successor. Although Seymour was released from the Tower and restored to the council in early 1550, in October 1551 he was sent to the Tower on an exaggerated charge of treason. Instead, he was executed for felony (that of seeking a change of government) on 22 January 1552 after scheming to overthrow Dudley's regime. Edward noted his uncle's death in his Chronicle: "the duke of Somerset had his head cut off upon Tower Hill between eight and nine o'clock in the morning". Edward Seymour, Duke of Somerset was interred at St. Peter ad Vincula, Tower of London.

=== Historiography ===
Historians have contrasted the efficiency of Edward Seymour's takeover of power in 1547 with the subsequent ineptitude of his rule. By autumn 1549, his costly wars had lost momentum, the crown faced financial ruin, and riots and rebellions had broken out around the country. Until recent decades, Seymour's reputation with historians was high, in view of his many proclamations that appeared to back the common people against a rapacious landowning class. In the early 20th century this line was taken by the influential A. F. Pollard, and was echoed by Edward VI's 1960s biographer W. K. Jordan. A more critical approach was initiated by M. L. Bush and Dale Hoak in the mid-1970s. Since that time the first Duke of Somerset has often been portrayed as an arrogant ruler, devoid of the political and administrative skills necessary for governing the Tudor state.

== Marriages and issue ==
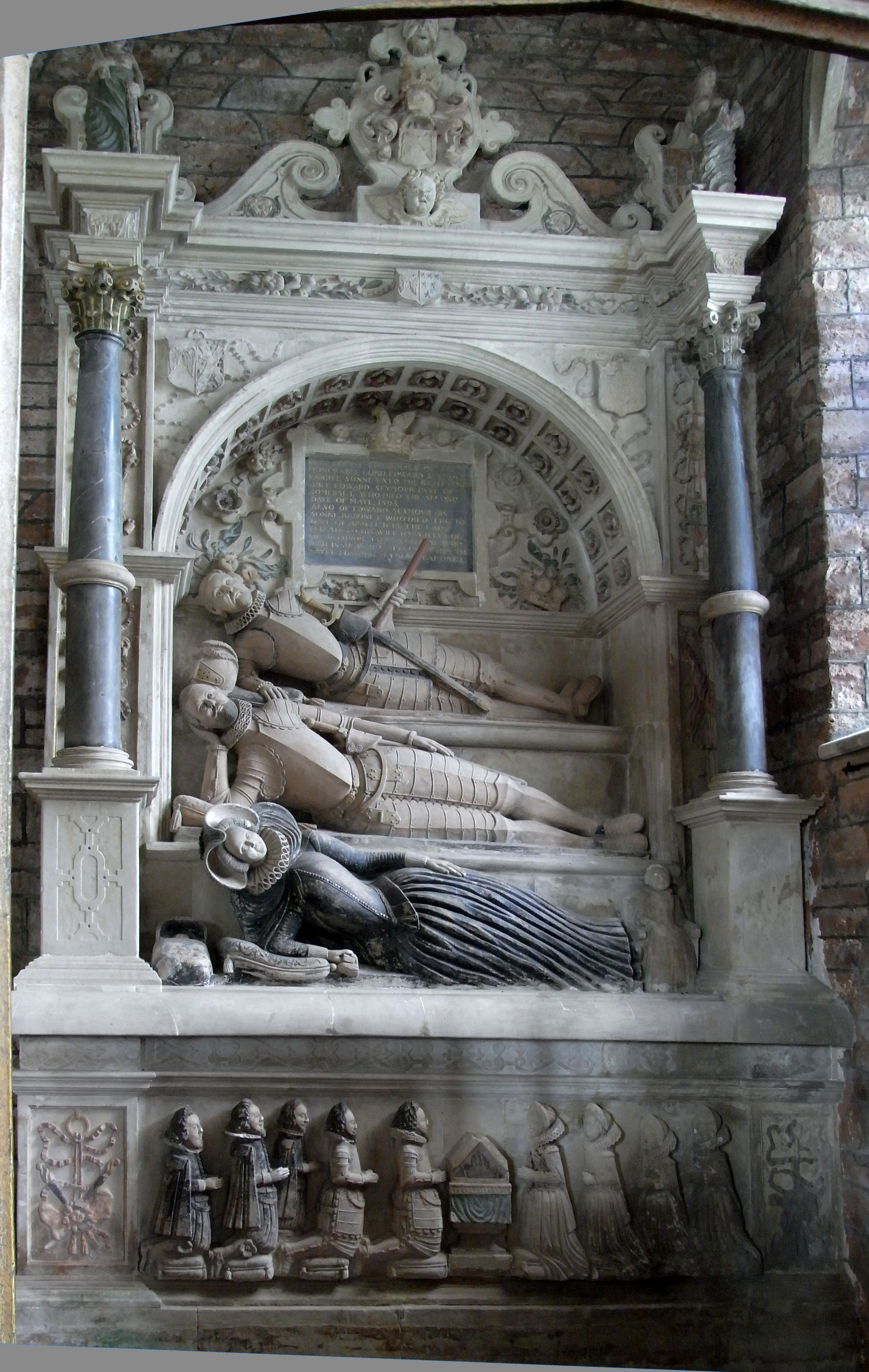
Monument to Lord Edward Seymour (d.1593), and to his son and daughter-in-law, St Mary's Church, Berry Pomeroy

Edward Seymour married twice:

- Firstly by 1518, to Catherine Fillol (or Filliol) (d. c. 1535), a daughter and co-heiress of Sir William Fillol (1453–1527), of Fillol's Hall, Essex and Woodlands, Horton, Dorset. Catherine bore two sons, whose paternity was questioned by her husband after it was discovered that she was "apt to bestow her favours too liberally", which resulted in both being excluded in 1540 from their paternal and maternal inheritances, and all their claims to their father's dignities being postponed to his children by his second wife. Ironically these two sons remained faithful to their father during his misfortunes and both were imprisoned with him in the Tower of London:
  - John Seymour (1527 – 19 December 1552) was sent to the Tower where he died in December 1552, having survived his father by 11 months. He successfully petitioned Parliament for the restoration of his maternal inheritance, but as her lands had been sold, he was awarded compensation in the form of the estate of Maiden Bradley, an Augustinian priory in Wiltshire granted to his father at the Dissolution by Henry VIII, which had descended to his half-siblings. However, he did not live to enjoy the grant and bequeathed it with all his other lands and goods to his younger brother Lord Edward Seymour.
  - Lord Edward Seymour (1529–1593) (Note: Name 'Lord Edward Seymour' is per Vivian, Herald's Visitations of Devon, 1895, p.702, and as shown on the inscription on his monument in Berry Pomeroy Church: Here lyeth the bodies of the Honorable Lord Edward Seymour, knight, sonne unto th Right Honorable Edward Seymour Duke of Somerset...) of Berry Pomeroy, Devon, Sheriff of Devon. He was sent to the Tower in 1551 but was later released, and became heir to his elder brother, from whom he inherited Maiden Bradley, where today Bradley House is the seat of his descendant, the present Duke of Somerset.

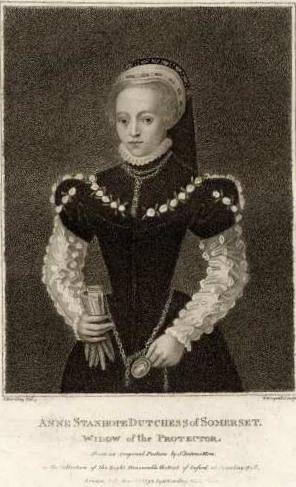
Anne Stanhope

- Secondly, before 9 March 1535, to Anne Stanhope (c. 1510–1587), only child and sole heiress of Sir Edward Stanhope (1462–1511) by his wife Elizabeth Bourchier (c. 1473–1557), daughter of Fulk Bourchier, 10th Baron FitzWarin (1445–1479). Seymour's suspicions about the fathering of Catherine Fillol's sons led him to obtain an act of Parliament in 1540, entailing his estates away from the children of his first wife in favour of the children of Anne Stanhope. By Anne, he had ten children:
  - Edward Seymour, Viscount Beauchamp of Hache (12 October 1537 – 1539), known by the courtesy title of one of his father's subsidiary titles. He died as a two-year-old infant and predeceased his father.
  - Lady Anne Seymour (1538–1588), who married twice: firstly to John Dudley, 2nd Earl of Warwick; secondly to Sir Edward Unton, MP, by whom she had children.
  - Edward Seymour, 1st Earl of Hertford (22 May 1539 – 1621), in 1559 created Earl of Hertford and Baron Beauchamp of Hatch by Queen Elizabeth I, the half-sister of King Edward VI. He married three times: firstly in November 1560, Lady Catherine Grey, by whom he had two sons; secondly in 1582 to Frances Howard, daughter of Baron Howard of Effingham; thirdly in 1601 to Frances Prannell.
  - Lord Henry Seymour (1540–?), married Lady Joan Percy, daughter of Thomas Percy, 7th Earl of Northumberland
  - Lady Margaret Seymour (born 1540), a noted author
  - Lady Jane Seymour (1541–1561), Maid of Honour to Queen Elizabeth I, also a noted author
  - Lady Catherine Seymour

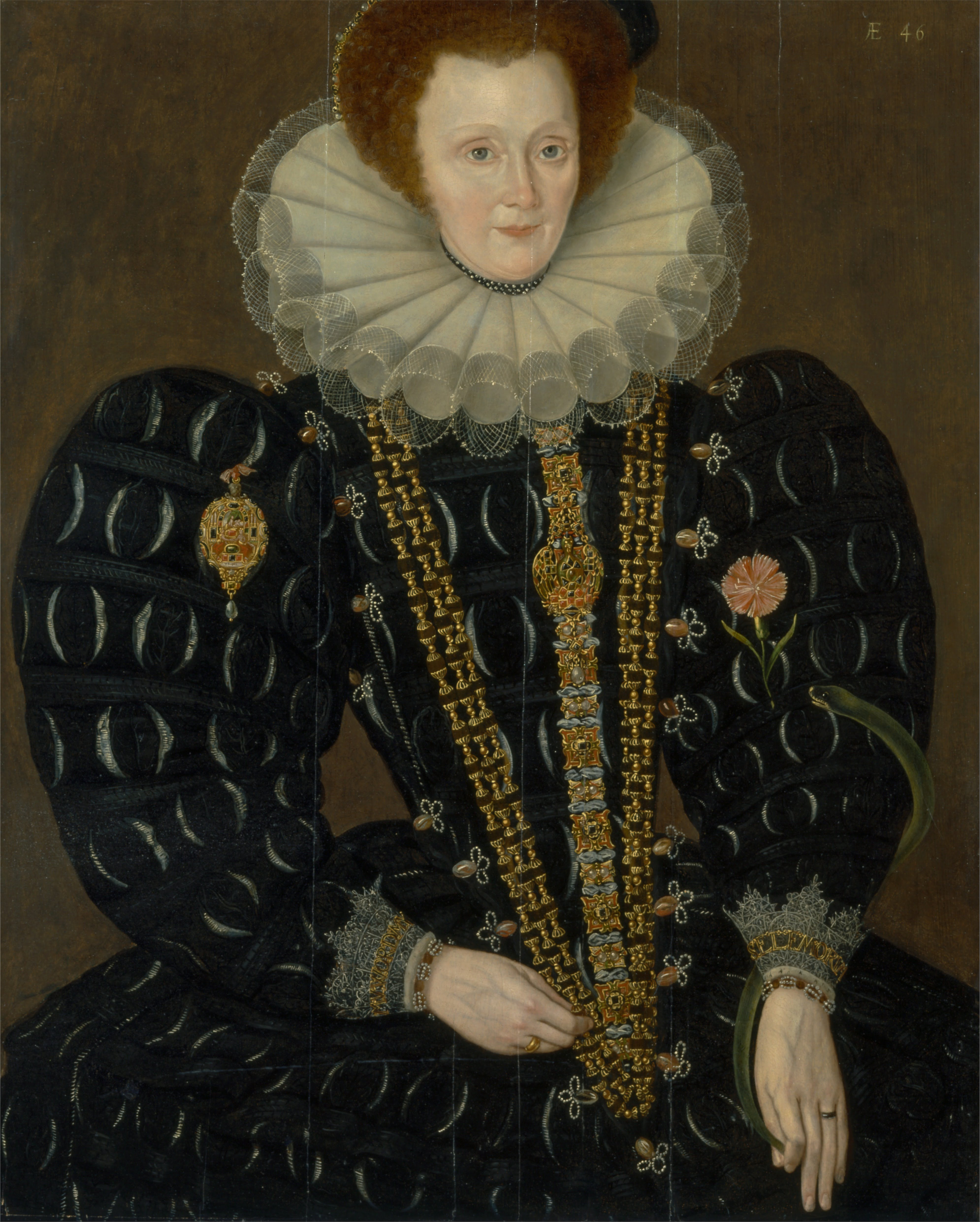
Elizabeth Knightley

  - Lady Mary Seymour (born 1542), who married three times:
    - Firstly to Francis Cosby
    - Secondly, to Andrew Rogers (died c. 1599), MP, of Bryanstone, Dorset. They had no children.
    - Thirdly, to Sir Henry Peyton.
  - Lord Edward Seymour (1548–1574), died unmarried and childless
  - Lady Elizabeth Seymour (1552 – 3 June 1602), who married Sir Richard Knightley, of Fawsley, Northamptonshire. Her portrait was painted by Marcus Gheeraerts the Younger including the Seymour phoenix badge, and her monument with effigy survives in All Saints church, Norton, Northamptonshire.

The male line of Edward Seymour and Anne Stanhope died out with the seventh Duke of Somerset in 1750, when the descendants of Edward Seymour by his first wife, Catherine Fillol, inherited the Somerset dukedom in accordance with the private act of 1540. However, the female line continued, and Queen Elizabeth II was descended from Somerset through his grandchild by Catherine Grey.

== In popular culture ==
=== Books ===
- Edward Seymour appears in The Prince and the Pauper by Mark Twain.
- Edward Seymour is the main character in The Path to Somerset by Janet Wertman, which depicts Edward's rise to power and rivalry with Stephen Gardiner.
- Edward Seymore as Lord Protector is an important figure in C.J. Sansom's Tombland, describing the Norfolk uprising.
- Edward Seymour appears in all three of Hilary Mantel's Thomas Cromwell novels: Wolf Hall, Bring Up the Bodies and The Mirror & the Light.

=== Television ===
- Laurence Naismith portrayed Edward Seymour in the 1962 Disneyland TV film The Prince and the Pauper.
- Daniel Moynihan portrayed Edward Seymour in the 1970 BBC series The Six Wives of Henry VIII.
- Bernard Kay portrayed Edward Seymour in the 1976 TV series The Prince and the Pauper.
- John Bowe portrayed Edward Seymour in the 1996 miniseries The Prince and the Pauper.
- Richard Felix portrayed Edward Seymour in the 2001 TV series The Six Wives of Henry VIII.
- Thomas Lockyer portrayed Edward Seymour in the 2003 TV serial Henry VIII.
- Max Brown portrayed Edward Seymour in Showtime's original historical fiction television series The Tudors, which portrayed him as a shrewd and ambitious political player.
- Ed Speleers portrayed Edward Seymour in the 2015 miniseries Wolf Hall. The role was recast for Wolf Hall: The Mirror and the Light with Seymour played by Will Tudor.
- John Heffernan portrayed Edward in the 2022 Starz series Becoming Elizabeth.
- Dominic Cooper portrayed Edward in the 2024 Amazon Prime series My Lady Jane.

=== Film ===
- Felix Aylmer portrayed Edward Seymour in the 1936 film Tudor Rose.
- Claude Rains portrayed Edward Seymour in the 1937 film The Prince and the Pauper.
- Guy Rolfe portrayed Edward Seymour in the 1953 film Young Bess.
- Michael Brill portrayed Edward Seymour in the 1969 musical film The Adventures of the Prince and the Pauper.
- Michael Byrne portrayed Edward Seymour in the 1972 film Henry VIII and His Six Wives.
- Harry Andrews portrayed Edward Seymour in the 1977 film The Prince and the Pauper.
- Jonathan Hyde portrayed Edward Seymour in the 2000 film The Prince and the Pauper.
- Thomas Lockyer portrayed Edward Seymour in the 2003 film The Other Boleyn Girl.

== See also ==
- Tudor period

== Citations ==
Political offices
Preceded by The Lord Russell	Lord High Admiral; 1542–1543	Succeeded by The Viscount Lisle
Preceded by The Duke of Norfolk	Lord High Treasurer; 1547–1549	Succeeded by The Marquess of Winchester
Preceded by The Duke of Norfolk	Earl Marshal; 1547–1549	Succeeded by The Earl of Warwick
Vacant Title last held by The Duke of Gloucester	Lord Protector of the Realm; 1547–1549	Vacant Title next held by Oliver Cromwell
Honorary titles
Preceded by The Duke of Suffolk	Lord Lieutenant of Berkshire; 1551–1552	Succeeded by The Marquess of Northampton
Peerage of England
New creation	Duke of Somerset; 1547–1552	Forfeit Title next held by William Seymour
