= Lord Edward Seymour (died 1593) =

English sheriff (c.1528–1593)

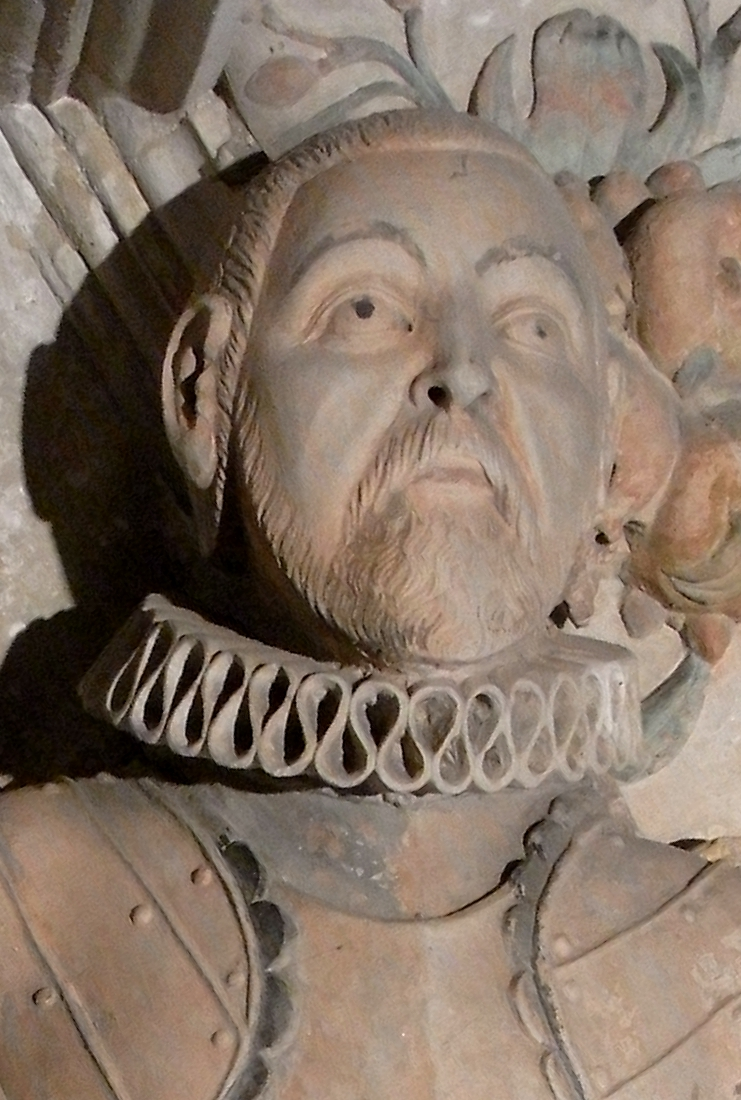
Detail of Seymour's effigy on the monument in Berry Pomeroy Church

Lord Edward Seymour (Note: The name 'Lord Edward Seymour' is per Vivian, Heraldic Visitations of Devon, 1895, p. 702, and as shown on the inscription on his monument in Berry Pomeroy Church: Here lyeth the bodies of the Honorable Lord Edward Seymour, knight, sonne unto th Right Honorable Edward Seymour Duke of Somerset...) (c. 1528 – 2 May 1593), knight, of Berry Pomeroy, Devon, was High Sheriff of Devon in 1583. He was knighted by his father the Duke of Somerset on the battlefield of Pinkie on 10 September 1547.

== Biography ==
Lord Edward Seymour was the second son of Edward Seymour, 1st Duke of Somerset by his first wife Catherine Fillol. The paternity of Catherine's two sons was questioned by her husband after it was alleged that she had had an affair. This resulted in both her sons being excluded in 1540 from their inheritances and their claims to their father's dignities in favour of his children by his second wife, Ann Stanhope; her eldest son succeeding his father as Duke of Somerset.

In June 1553, he received the manor of Berry Pomeroy, Devon, including Berry Pomeroy Castle.

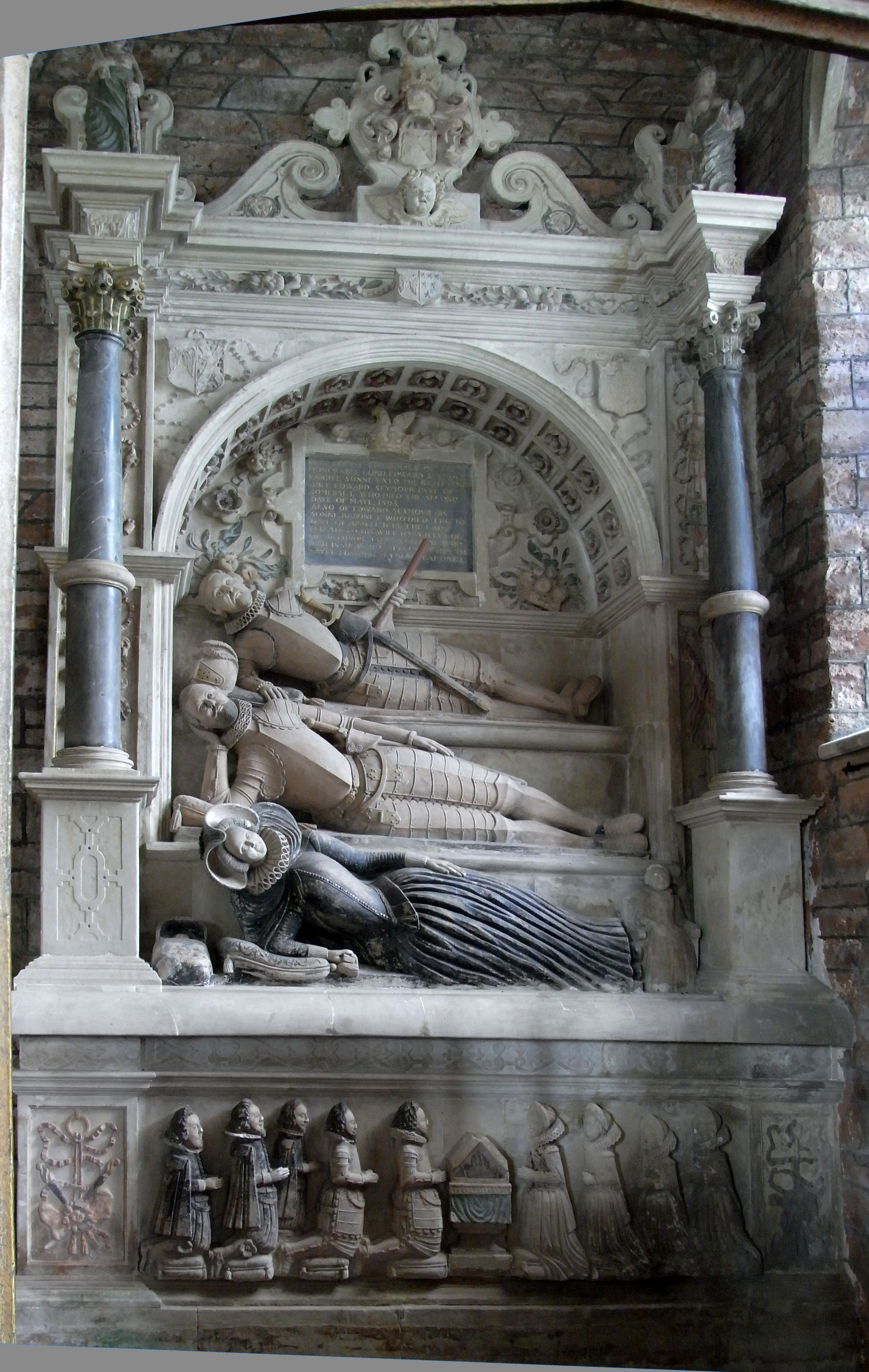
Monument to Lord Edward Seymour and to his son and daughter-in-law, Berry Pomeroy Church

Seymour married Margaret Walshe, a daughter and co-heiress of John Walshe of Cathanger, Fivehead, Somerset, Justice of the Common Pleas in 1563, MP. by whom he had one son, Sir Edward Seymour, 1st Baronet (d. 1613).

== Monument in Berry Pomeroy church ==
A monument to Lord Edward Seymour survives in St Mary's Church, Berry Pomeroy, standing against the north wall of the north aisle of the Seymour Chapel. It was described by the architectural historian Nikolaus Pevsner (1952) as: "The figure carving astonishingly naive. To think that the children of Lord Protector Somerset were satisfied with this!" Hoskins (1959) on the contrary called it "fine". Writing in 1909, John Stabb described the monument thus:

In the north wall of the chapel at the east end of the north aisle is a fine monument [...], erected to the memory of Lord Edward Seymour, the son of the Protector, who died in 1593, and of his son, Sir Edward Seymour, and his daughter-in-law, Elizabeth, daughter of Arthur Champernowne. The arch is ornamented with roses and pomegranates; beneath the arch lie the knights, clothed in plate armour, one above the other; below lies the lady, behind her head a cradle with a child in it, and at her feet a figure in a chair. On the panel beneath are the kneeling figures of the nine children, five male and four female.
