= St Mary's Church, Berry Pomeroy =

Anglican parish church in Devonshire

St. Mary's Church, Berry Pomeroy
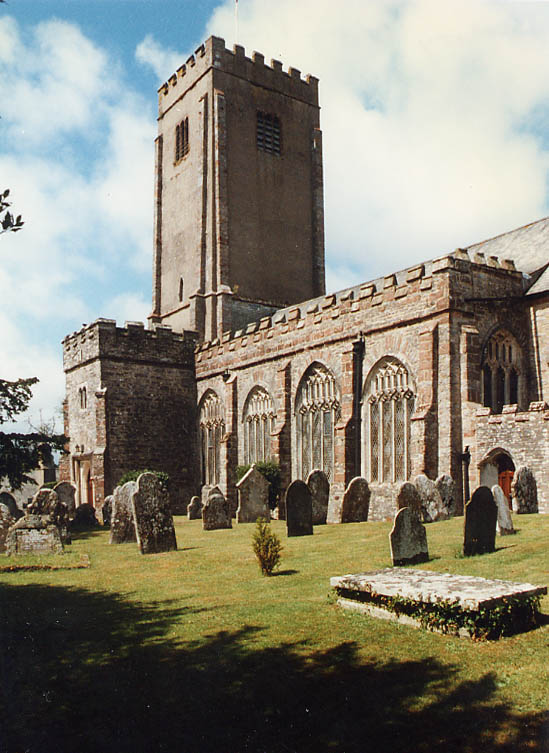
- St. Mary's Church, Berry Pomeroy
- 50.43725°N 3.65040°W
- Religious institute: Parish Church

Architecture
- Architectural type: Gothic
- Style: Perpendicular Style

Administration
- District: South Hams
- Archdeaconry: Totnes
- Parish: Berry Pomeroy

St Mary's Church of Berry Pomeroy is an Anglican parish church in Berry Pomeroy, with a full length, forty-two foot wide, rood screen which has been described as one of the most perfect in Devon. It is listed on the Heritage at Risk Register.

== The Building ==
The church was rebuilt by Richard de Pomeroy in the late 15th century at the site of a pre-existing church. The architecture is in the perpendicular style. The church comprises a nave and chancel in one, on the northern and southern range aisles and a porch with parvise and groined roof with bosses - as described by John Stabb: "bearing the arms of the Pomeroy family". The tower contains eight bells, which are dated from the years with four dated 1607, 1635, 1751, 1829. And four dated 1897 and 1909 . The church was restored in the late 17th century and in 1878-79.

== Interior ==
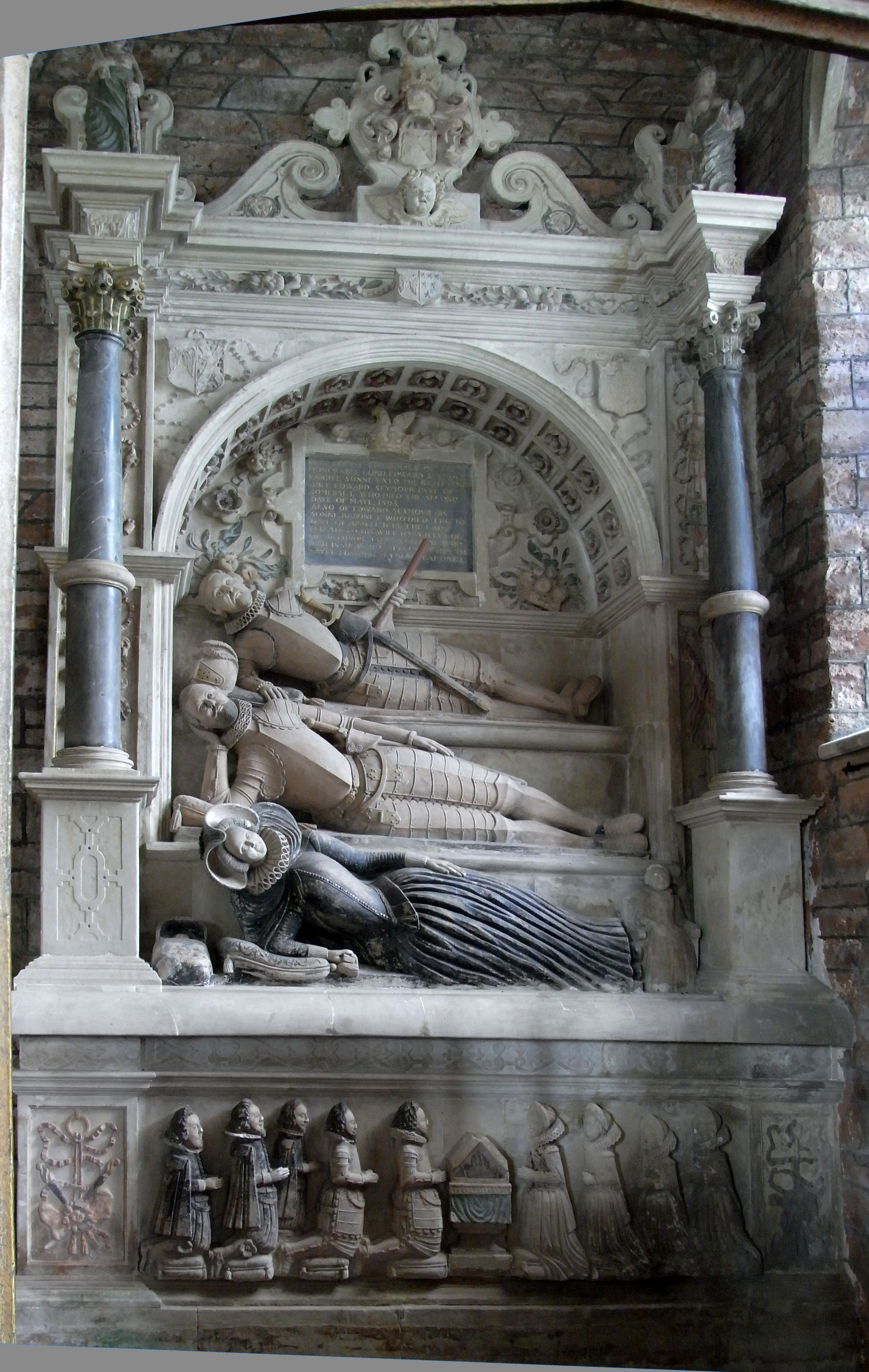
Monument to Lord Edward Seymour (d.1593). Lord Edward is the topmost reclining effigy, below whom is his son Sir Edward (d.1613), and the latter's wife at the lowest level, Elizabeth, née Champernowne

It has a forty-two feet long rood screen described by Nikolaus Pevsner as "one of the most perfect in Devon" It is unusual in being complete from the north to south walls and also in retaining its original coving, cornice and cresting. The wainscoting has painted figures. The stained-glass windows include a few reset old fragments, but are most notable for the panels by Christopher Whall, created in 1897 and 1908, and by his daughter, Veronica Whall, who installed one in 1926.

There are two notable monuments in the church. The older one on the north of the chancel originates from the end of the 15th century and it is described by Stabb as a tomb, which is synonymously described by English Heritage as a tomb chest - sarcophagi with quatrefoils and weepers in niches. This monument is dedicated to Sir Richard Pomeroy (died 1496) and his wife. This tomb had been robbed of all ornamentation before the 18th century, as the vicar John Prince reported in his book "Worthies of Devon".

A monument to Lord Edward Seymour stands against the north wall of the north aisle of the Seymour Chapel. It was described by the architectural historian Nikolaus Pevsner (1952) as: "The figure carving astonishingly naïve. To think that the children of Lord Protector Somerset were satisfied with this!" W. G. Hoskins (1959) on the contrary called it fine".

Writing in 1909, John Stabb described the monument thus:

In the north wall of the chapel at the east end of the north aisle is a fine monument [...], erected to the memory of Lord Edward Seymour, the son of the Protector, who died in 1593, and of his son, Sir Edward Seymour, and his daughter-in-law, Elizabeth, daughter of Arthur Champernowne. The arch is ornamented with roses and pomegranates; beneath the arch lie the knights, clothed in plate armour, one above the other; below lies the lady, behind her head a cradle with a child in it, and at her feet a figure in a chair. On the panel beneath are the kneeling figures of the nine children, five male and four female.

A tablet in the chancel remembers the vicar John Prince, who was the author of the book "Worthies of Devon".

In the southern porch are the arms of the Pomeroy family.

A carved effigy of St George with folding doors has been dedicated to fallen soldiers of the First World War by the Vicar of Totnes, Rev W. T. Wellacott in April 1920.

A display as a remembrance of the events during the Second World War—as American soldiers prepared for D-Day—is inside the church.

== Vicars of St Mary's ==
A continuous succession line of the Vicars of St Mary's Church, Berry Pomeroy is reported for a time of over 200 years:

- John Prince (1681–1723)
- Joseph Fox (1723–1789)
- John Edwards (1789–1834)
- Edward Brown (1834–1843)
- William Burrough Cosens (1843–1861)
- Arthur J. Everett (1861–1896)
- Henry Stewart Prinsep (1896–1908), nephew of Susan St Maur, Duchess of Somerset

In recent times there is no vicar at St. Mary's and the services are held by reverends from out of the village. The maintenance of the church is organized by the Friends of Berry Pomeroy Church.

== Recent Status ==
Since 1961 it is a Grade I listed building, and is on the Heritage at Risk Register. The condition is described as poor, suffering from 'slow decay—no solution agreed'. An association, called the Friends of Berry Pomeroy Church, maintains the building. Over £250,000 had been invested, mainly from donations. Further works are planned, as the tower and the roof on the south side could be repaired, and the bells could be renewed.

== Cinema ==
The church and the church yard were the film location for the making the final scene of Sense and Sensibility by Ang Lee, featuring Kate Winslet, Hugh Grant and Emma Thompson.

== See also ==
- Queene's Day
- Berry Pomeroy
