= Queen's Day (disambiguation) =

Queensday (Dutch: Koninginnedag), also spelt Queen's Day in English, was a national holiday in the Kingdom of the Netherlands, from 1890 to 2013, that was succeeded by Kingsday or Koningsdag.

Queensday may also refer to:

- International Women's Day, sometimes called Queen's Day
- Queen's Official Birthday, a celebration of the birthday of the Monarch of the United Kingdom and the other Commonwealth realms when the Monarch is a Queen
- Queene's Day, a celebration of the accession of Queen Elizabeth I
