= John Stabb =

John Stabb may refer to:

- John Stabb (musician) (1961–2016), American punk-rock vocalist
- John Stabb (ecclesiologist) (1865–1917), English ecclesiologist and antiquary

== See also ==
- Newton John Stabb (1868–1931), Canadian-born British banker in Hong Kong
