= Fillol's Hall =

Bygone manor house of Essex, England

Coordinates: 51.8434°N 0.6792°E

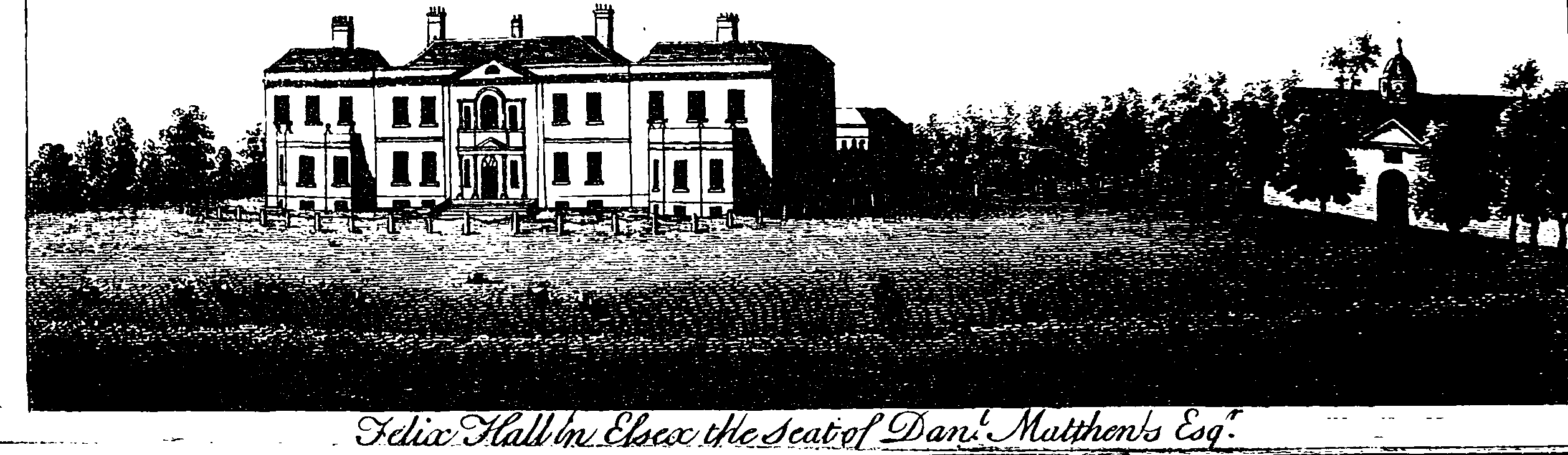
Felix Hall in 1776

Fillol's Hall or Felix Hall, Kelvedon, Essex was an English manor house. It belonged to the Fillol family, which included Catherine Fillol, Lady Seymour, the first wife of the future Lord Protector of England Sir Edward Seymour, 1st Duke of Somerset, uncle of King Edward VI.

In the mid eighteenth century the Hall was acquired by the plantation owner Daniel Mathew (1718-1777) and sold after his death. A fine family portrait c1763 painted by Johan Zoffany was part of the National Trust Clandon Park House collection, Guildford.

Charles Western, 1st Baron Western bought Felix Hall about 1790. Western in the early nineteenth century made additions there in classical style, to create a modern mansion. They were based on a drawing by Antoine Desgodetz of the Temple of Portunus.

In 1953 Felix Hall, then in ruins, was bought by Milner Gray and his wife.
