= Upavon =

Village in Wiltshire, England

Coordinates: 51.294°N 1.808°W

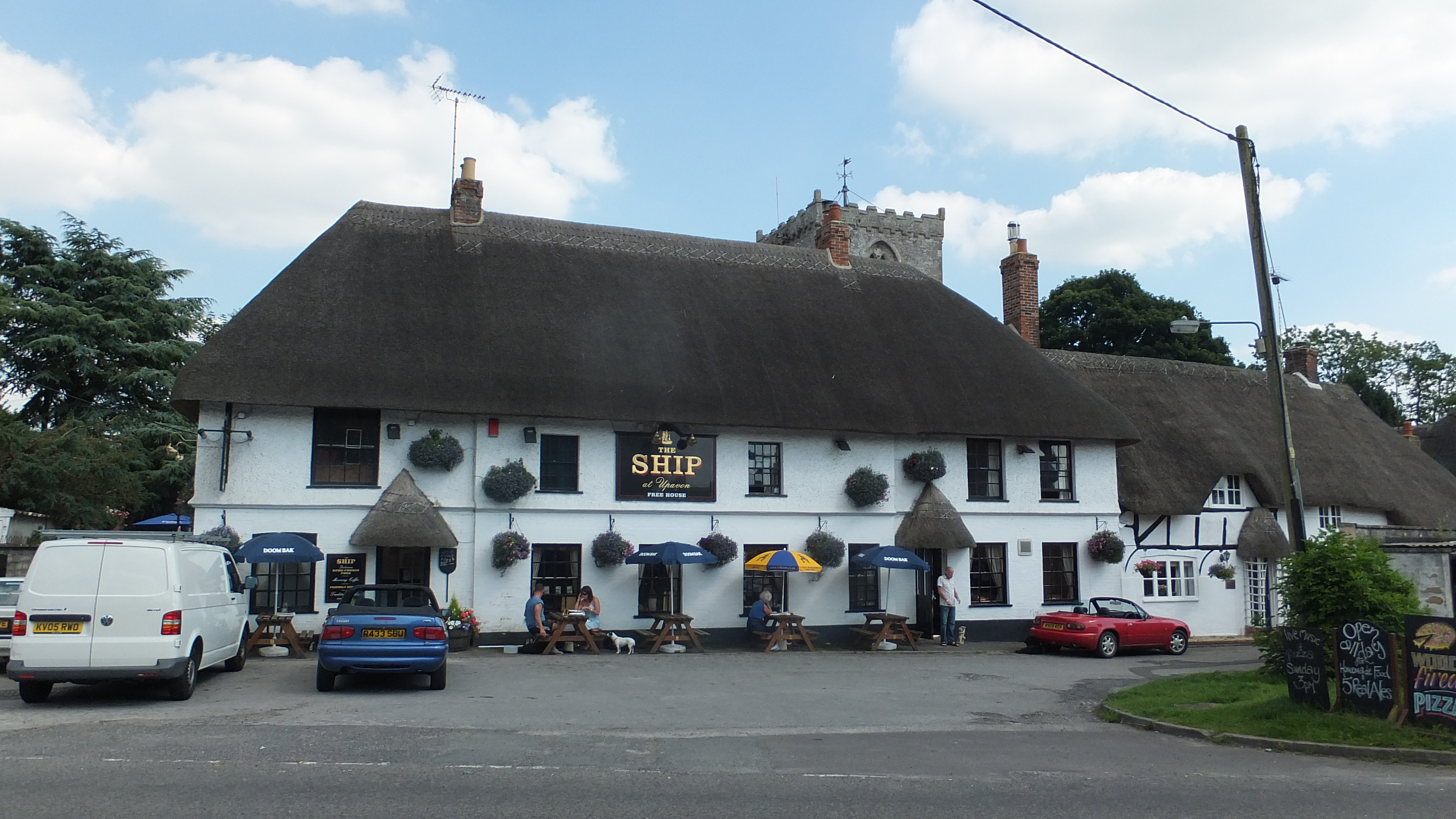
- The Ship, Upavon, with church tower behind

- Location within Wiltshire
- Population: 1,190 (in 2011)
- OS grid reference: SU135550
- Civil parish: Upavon
- Unitary authority: Wiltshire
- Ceremonial county: Wiltshire
- Region: South West
- Country: England
- Sovereign state: United Kingdom
- Post town: PEWSEY
- Postcode district: SN9
- Dialling code: 01980
- Police: Wiltshire
- Fire: Dorset and Wiltshire
- Ambulance: South Western
- UK Parliament: East Wiltshire
- Website: Parish Council

Upavon is a rural village and civil parish in the county of Wiltshire, England. As its name suggests, it is on the upper portion of the River Avon which runs from north to south through the village. It is on the north edge of Salisbury Plain about 4 miles (6.4 km) south of Pewsey, 10 miles (16 km) southeast of the market town of Devizes, and 20 miles (32 km) north of the cathedral city of Salisbury. The A345 and A342 roads run through the village.

== History ==
Occupation of the area dates back to the Iron Age and Romano-British settlement at Casterley Camp, approximately 1.5 miles (2.4 km) southwest of the current village, and to the southeast was the small Iron Age settlement of Chisenbury Camp. The first mention of Upavon is in the 1086 Domesday Book as Oppavrene; although no population was recorded, it can be estimated that the village supported some 200 to 250 people.

The village prospered during the 12th and 13th centuries and started to develop features that are recognisable today. A large Norman church replaced the previous Saxon one, a manor house was built in the south of the village and a market square developed west of the church, in the area that now lies between the two village pubs.

Land in the west of the parish was acquired in 1898 for an army firing range, and in the west a military airfield and flying school were begun in 1912. Council houses were built in the Avon Square area, about half a mile southeast of the village centre, in stages from c.1920.

== Geography ==
Upavon village lies in the valley where the headwaters of the Avon leave the Vale of Pewsey and cut through the north scarp of Salisbury Plain. The parish extends both east and west onto the downs above the valley.

== Governance ==
All significant local government services are provided by Wiltshire Council, a unitary authority with its headquarters in Trowbridge, and the parish is represented there by Paul Oatway. For Westminster elections, the parish is part of the East Wiltshire constituency.

== Military establishment ==
Upavon airfield, now called Trenchard Lines, and previously RAF Upavon, is situated about 1.5 miles (2.4 km) east of Upavon village. The site was originally constructed around 1912 as a Royal Flying Corps (RFC) base, and became the home of the RFC Central Flying School on 19 June 1912, later to be the RAF Central Flying School upon formation of the Royal Air Force. Upavon is referred to as the place where the Royal Air Force was formed.

Since 1993 the main function of the military base has changed, and it is now largely an MoD administrative centre, and home to administrative headquarters of the British Army. The grass airfield is still used by the RAF from time to time but is now most frequently associated with regular glider activity, with the only permanent RAF unit based there being No. 622 Volunteer Gliding Squadron, providing glider training to members of the Air Cadet Organisation. The Army Gliding Club also uses the airfield in co-operation with 622 VGS.

== Religious sites ==
=== Priory church and parish church ===
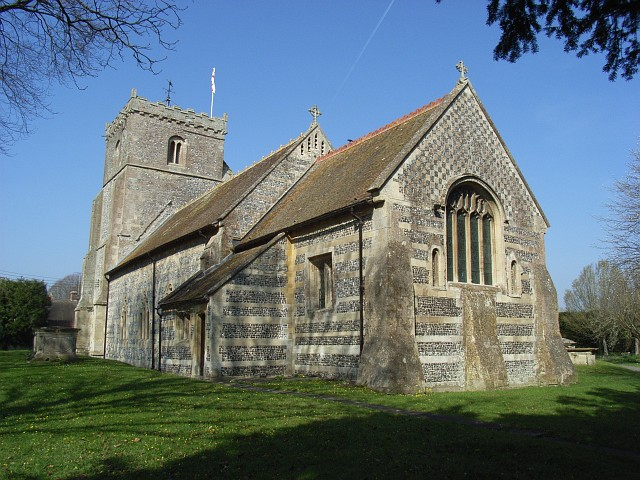
St Mary's Church, Upavon

The church is built of flint with stone banding and is dedicated to St Mary. It was designated as Grade I listed in 1964.

The Domesday Book of 1086 recorded a church, and land held by the Benedictine monastery of Saint-Wandrille, Normandy. A small priory was established in the 12th century, and the church was presumably rebuilt later in that century or early in the 13th, as the chancel and chancel arch are of that period. The substantial west tower was added in the late 13th. When foreign priories were expelled in 1378, there were only three monks. The octagonal font with elaborate carved decoration is from the 12th century, but mounted on a 19th-century base.

By the early 15th century the church was said to be ruinous, and the nave was re-roofed. The south aisle was removed sometime before 1859. Restoration in 1875 was by T.H. Wyatt (chancel) and J.P. Seddon (nave rebuilt). In 1910 the five bells were recast and a sixth added. Pevsner attributes the design of the stained glass in the 1918 east window to Henry Holiday.

The churches at Charlton St Peter and Rushall were dependent on Upavon. By the early 14th century the income from Charlton had been assigned to Upavon Priory, and in 1423 Upavon and Charlton were granted to the Augustinian canons of Ivychurch Priory, southeast of Salisbury, who held them until the Dissolution of the Monasteries. Rushall became fully independent in 1395.

The benefice of Upavon was combined with Rushall in 1924, but the parishes remained separate. Today the parish is part of the Vale of Pewsey benefice, a group of sixteen churches around Pewsey.

=== Others ===
Upavon Baptist Chapel, named for the Cave of Adullam in the Old Testament, was built in 1838 of rendered brick, with a slate roof.

A Methodist church was built at Avon Square in 1966, replacing an earlier tin chapel. It closed around 2006.

== Notable buildings ==
The High Street has several 18th-century buildings, many of them thatched. The Manor House, in grounds on the right bank of the river, began as a small 15th-century house which has been much altered and extended.

== Facilities ==
The village has two public houses – the Antelope (1765) and the Ship (early 18th century). There is a shop, a doctors' surgery, a small hairdressers salon, a village hall and a golf course.

The nearest secondary school is at Pewsey and the nearest primary school is at Rushall. A school was built at Avon Square in 1957, replacing a 19th-century building next to the church, to cater for children of RAF personnel; up to 200 pupils could be accommodated. Pupil numbers declined as RAF activity reduced and fell further after 1993 when the station was transferred to the Army, leading to closure of the school in 2009.

Service Children's Education has its headquarters at Trenchard Lines.

The nearest mainline railway station, with links to London Paddington, is Pewsey, about 3 1/2 miles (6 km) away.

== Notable people ==
- Brigadier John Bellman (1920–1998), ADC to Queen Elizabeth II, lived here in later life.
