= Fillol =

Fillol may refer to:

- Álvaro Fillol (born 1952), former professional tennis player
- Catherine Fillol, Duchess of Somerset
- Jaime Fillol (born 1946), former tennis player
- Jérôme Fillol (born 1978), French rugby player
- John Fillol, MP for Essex
- Ubaldo Fillol (born 1950), Argentinian footballer

== See also ==
- Fillols
