= Wilton Priory =

Priory in Wiltshire, England

Wilton Priory was a priory in Wiltshire, England.

== See also ==
- List of monastic houses in Wiltshire
