= Chisenbury Camp =

Iron Age hillfort in Wiltshire, England

- possibly Cissanbyrig
- Location within Wiltshire
- 51.2838°N 1.7836°W
- Periods: Iron Age
- Location: Wiltshire, England

Site notes
- Public access: no

Chisenbury Camp is the site of an Iron Age univallate hillfort in Broad Chalke parish in Wiltshire, England. The site comprises a small circular 5-acre enclosure that was levelled in 1931. The site was partially excavated in the 19th century and there were finds of ceramics, worked stone, worked animal bone and remains of human burial; some are held by the Wiltshire Museum at Devizes. It is a scheduled monument.

The site currently lies within the bounds of a small grass strip airfield, the former RAF Upavon, and is run through by the perimeter access road on the southern side of the field.

== Location ==
The site is at grid reference SU15195387, in Enford parish, about 1 1/2 miles (2.4 km) to the south-east of the village of Upavon.

The larger Iron Age hill fort of Casterley Camp lies on the other side of the River Avon valley, about 2 1/2 miles (4 km) to the west. There are also a number of other Iron Age earthworks in the area.

== See also ==
- List of hillforts in England
