= Casterley Camp =

Iron Age hillfort in Wiltshire, England

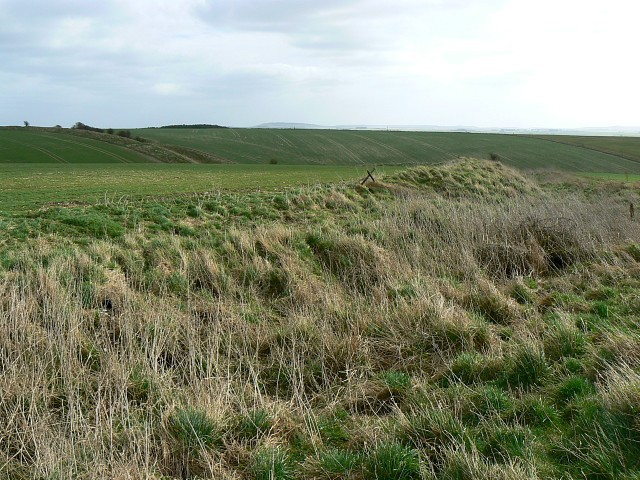
- Casterley Camp

- Location within Wiltshire
- 51.2805°N 1.8365°W
- Periods: Iron Age
- Location: Wiltshire, England
- Grid position: SU115535

Site notes
- Public access: yes

Casterley Camp is the site of an Iron Age univallate hillfort in Wiltshire, England, about 1 1/2 miles (2.4 km) south-west of the village of Upavon. The site comprises a large Iron Age/Romano-British enclosure, possibly non-defensive in function, and incomplete. It was partially excavated in the 19th century.

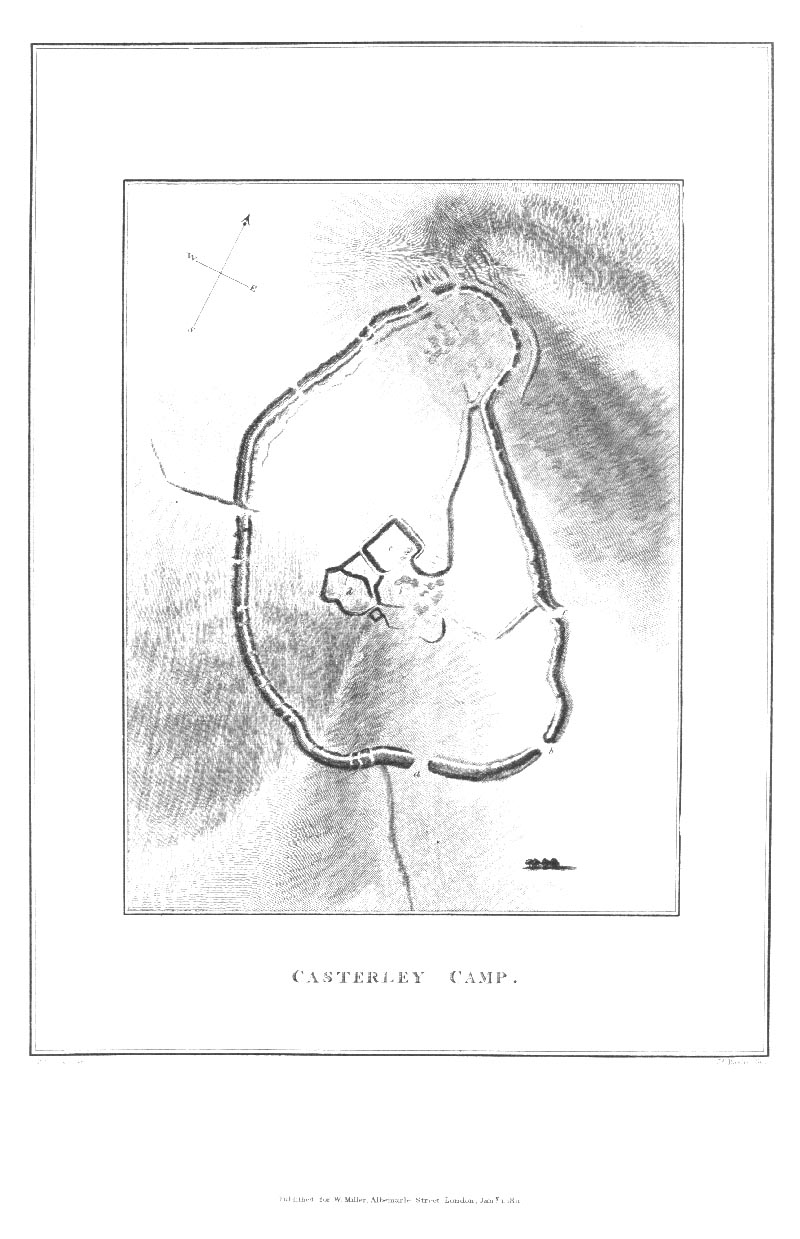
Pencil sketch of Castlerley camp by Sir Richard Colt Hoare, 1810, The Ancient History of Wiltshire

Three apparently related enclosures are identified within the site of Casterley Camp. Stock control and religious functions have been attributed to the enclosures. There is also an Iron Age/Romano-British trackway on the west side of the site, with traces of earth banks on both sides. The site is a scheduled monument.

There are public footpaths and bridleways to the north and west of the site. Since 1898, land immediately west and south has been part of the Salisbury Plain firing ranges.

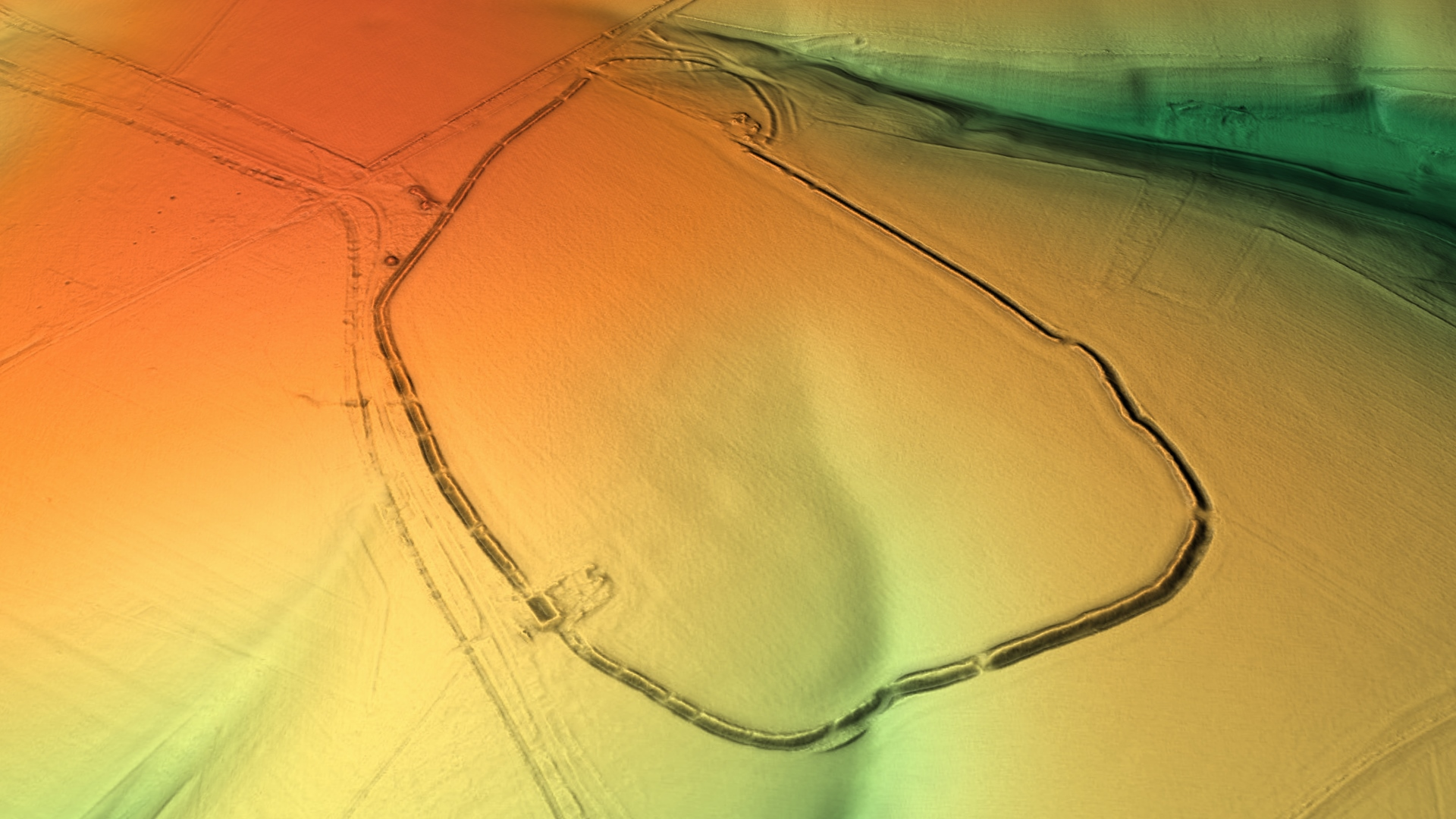
3D view of the digital terrain model

The site of a smaller Iron Age hill fort, Chisenbury Camp, lies on the other side of the River Avon valley, about 2 1/2 miles (4 km) to the east.

== See also ==
- List of hillforts in England
