= Ivychurch Priory =

Former priory in Alderbury, Wiltshire

Coordinates: 51.0481°N 1.7412°W

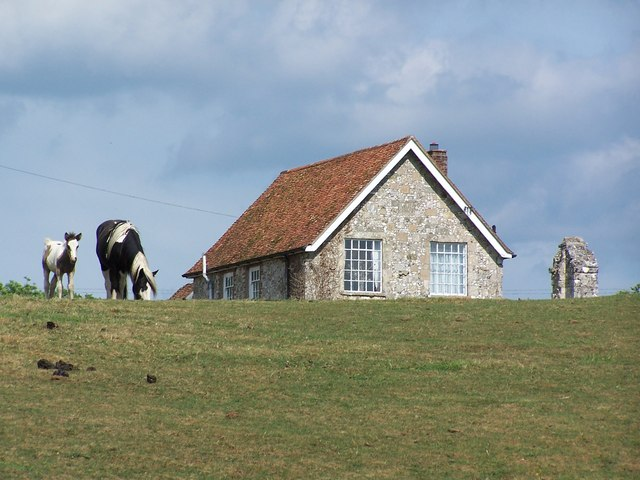
Ivychurch farmhouse and (right) part of the remains of the priory

Ivychurch Priory was a medieval monastic house in Alderbury, southeast of Salisbury, Wiltshire, England. According to Historic England, "all that remains is a cylindrical pier with multi-scalloped capital and part of the double-chamfered arch with a respond to the west with a half-pier and capital; this is attached to the west wall of the church which retains one buttress".

After the Dissolution of the Monasteries it became a private house and estate in the Herbert family. Sir Philip Sidney wrote most of his Arcadia there, and it lay within the sphere of Wilton House and the literary society which was encouraged there by Mary Sidney Herbert.

== History ==
The Augustinian monastery of Ivychurch, also called Monasterium Ederosum or 'Ederose', was claimed in 1274 to have been a royal foundation of King Stephen's, based upon a small minster chapel dependent upon Alderbury church, either by Stephen's confirmation of the gift of the chapel to Salisbury in 1139 or by a subsequent endowment. There is a tradition that Thomas Becket, Archbishop of Canterbury, stayed at the priory during the Council of Clarendon in 1164. The minster had a 12th-century cloister, and became the priory church, which also served as the parish church for the inhabitants of Clarendon Forest, in the environs of Clarendon Palace, throughout the mediæval period.

After successive royal endowments (which are recorded down to the time of King Edward III) in 1473 the priory held 'at least 740 acres of pasture and wood' in the park and forest. Other holdings included the farm which had been the land of the small Benedictine Upavon Priory, granted in 1423. The priory owned the manor of Whaddon in Alderbury and the advowson of the church, which were given by Robert de Bluntesdon, Canon of Salisbury: however in 1397, during the extravagant rule of Prior Virgo, when the number of canons at one point sank to only two, Richard II deprived Ivychurch of these holdings and placed them in the care of the Exchequer. However it was restored, and with right of warren, and pasture for 700 sheep, this was in 1535 the richest part of the Ivychurch priory holdings.

During the Black Death Ivychurch lost its Prior and twelve canons, leaving only one, who (since there could be no election) was therefore raised to Prior by Edward III. Impoverished under Prior Virgo, the priory recovered its fortunes during the fifteenth century; with prior, five canon priests and one novice, it was relatively prosperous and had some new buildings by 1536, when it was dissolved. The last prior was Richard Page, elected 1493, a friend of Lord and Lady Lisle. A full list of the priors and many details of their elections survive.

== Dissolution and after ==
In March 1537 Robert Seymour was granted a lease of 21 years on the priory, manors and lands, and this became a life grant in 1539. The reversion of these was purchased by John Barwicke, Wiltshire steward of the Earl of Hertford, in 1544, and the buildings came finally to Henry Herbert, 2nd Earl of Pembroke, who converted them into a private dwelling. Most of the priory buildings, including the early cloisters, stood until 1888 when they were pulled down. A carved chimney piece from the site was formerly in The Green Dragon pub in Alderbury, and a memorial water trough erected in 1902 on Alderbury village green has four re-used double capitals, probably from the cloisters.

An early resident at Ivychurch was Edward Penruddock of Arkleby (Cumbria) and his son Sir George Penruddock (d. 1581), a J.P. for Wiltshire from 1554, M.P. for Wiltshire in 1558 and 1572, and Sheriff of Wiltshire 1562–63, Steward to the first Earl of Pembroke. Sir George had gained great honour as standard-bearer under Pembroke at the Battle of St. Quentin (1557), during which he vanquished a French nobleman in single combat.

The Ivychurch house came through the Earl of Pembroke to Mary Sidney Herbert, the distinguished literary figure and patroness, sister of Sir Philip Sidney, and it is said that a large part of Sidney's Arcadia, called more fully The Countess of Pembroke's Arcadia, was written at Ivychurch. (Aubrey wrote: "...Ivy-church (which adjoyns to the parke pale of Clarindon Parke) situated on a hill that overlookes all the Country westwards, and North over Sarum and the plaines, and into that delicious parke (which was accounted the best of England) Eastwards. It was anciently a pleasant Monasterie (the Cloysters remayne still). ...These Romancy Plaines, and Boscages did no doubt conduce to the heightening of Sir Philip Sidneys Phansie.") It also gives its name to The Countess of Pembroke's Yvychurch of Abraham Fraunce. During the Civil War, Ivychurch was held by the royalists.

In 1985 the ruins of the priory were designated as a Grade II listed building. The Wiltshire Victoria County History provides a detailed history of this site since circa 1110.
