= Upavon Priory =

Monastery in Wiltshire, England

Coordinates: 51.295°N 1.806°W

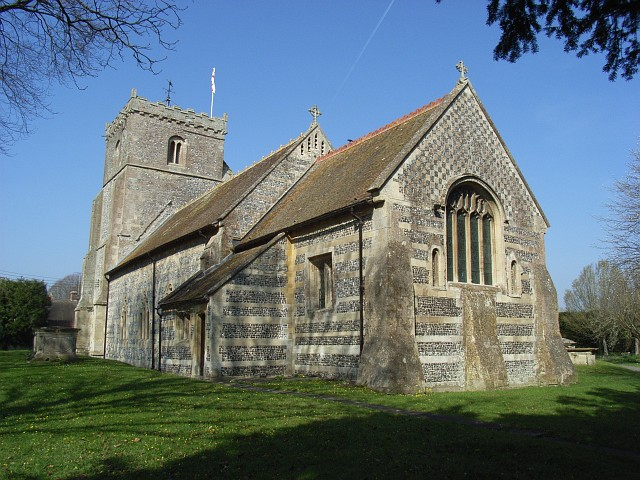
The former priory church: St Mary's, Upavon, begun in the 13th century

Upavon Priory was a small priory in Wiltshire, England.

Domesday Book in 1086 recorded land at Upavon held by the Benedictine monastery of Saint-Wandrille, Normandy. A priory was probably established in the 12th century, and in the 13th the church became a prebend of Salisbury. A valuation in 1324 found livestock, two horses, two beds, three tables and sparse chapel fittings. Around this time the nearby church at Charlton St Peter had been appropriated to the priory.

Monks of alien priories were expelled from England in 1378, and the priory became a farm. In 1423 Upavon Priory was granted to the Augustinian canons of Ivychurch Priory, south-east of Salisbury, who held it until the Dissolution.

There are intermittent records of priors of Upavon between 1262 and 1361. The last remaining building, a barn on a site between the church and the River Avon, was demolished in the early 1820s.
