= Salisbury Friary =

Dominican friary in Salisbury, England

Coordinates: 51.0695°N 1.7993°W

Salisbury Friary otherwise Salisbury Blackfriars was a Dominican friary in Salisbury, Wiltshire, England, in existence from 1281 to 1538.

In 1281, Edward I granted land to the Dominican friars which allowed them to move from the house they had established in 1245 at Wilton (Wilton Friary). The site was at grid reference SU 1416 3004 on the north-west edge of the city, on what is now Fisherton Street, just beyond the bridge over the Avon.

The friary received royal support for a time, and was granted building materials from Clarendon Park. The establishment was dissolved in 1538, when the prior and 13 friars surrendered their house to the king's visitor. The property was sold in 1545 and today no visible trace of the buildings remains. In 1978, after redevelopment of the Maltings area uncovered human remains, archaeologists found four burials and some wall foundations. Further test pits in 2019 found four more graves but no traces of buildings, therefore the position of the friary within the site remains unknown.
