= Salisbury Grey Friary =

Friary in Wiltshire, England

Coordinates: 51.0658°N 1.7925°W

Salisbury Grey Friary was a friary in Wiltshire, England between the 1230s and 1538.

The Franciscan Grey Friars came to England in 1224, and by 1230 Henry III was providing building materials for their church at St Ann Street, Salisbury, which may have been founded at the instigation of Richard Poore (bishop of Salisbury 1217–1228). Little is known of its later history until the institution was surrendered during the dissolution in October 1538, when its financial value was found to be low. No visible traces remain of the buildings.

The 17th-century house called The Priory, a short distance away at 95 Brown Street, may be on a site connected with the monastery.
