= Catherine Fillol =

English noblewoman (c.1507–1535)

Catherine Fillol (or Filliol; c. 1507 – c. 1535), Lady Seymour, was an English aristocrat and the first wife of Edward Seymour, 1st Duke of Somerset. The current Duke of Somerset is her distant but direct descendant.

== Family ==
Fillol was the daughter and co-heiress of Sir William Fillol (or Filliol; 1453 – 9 July 1527), of Woodlands, Horton, Dorset, and of Fillol's Hall, Essex.

She was the first wife of Sir Edward Seymour, who went on to become the first Duke of Somerset of a new creation. He was Lord Protector of England and the uncle of King Edward VI, after his sister Jane Seymour married King Henry VIII.

They had two sons:

- John Seymour (c. 1527 – buried 19 December 1552), who died unmarried and without issue in the Tower of London
- Edward Seymour (c. 1528 – 1593), Sheriff of Devon, who married Margaret Walshe, the daughter and co-heiress of John Walshe of Cathanger, Fivehead, Somerset. He had one son, Sir Edward Seymour, 1st Baronet (d. 1613).

Their paternity was questioned by her husband after it was discovered that she was "apt to bestow her favours too liberally."

== Alleged extramarital affair with her father-in-law ==
A 17th-century marginal note to a copy of Vincent's Baronage at the College of Arms alleged that she had had an affair with her father-in-law, Sir John Seymour. However, there is no contemporary evidence to support this. Fillol may have gone to a local convent, as this seems to be implied by a remark in her father's will. The will was challenged by her husband Sir Edward Seymour in 1531, on the basis that his father-in-law was not of sound mind.

== Death ==
In 1535, Sir Edward Seymour married his second wife, Anne Stanhope, indicating that Fillol had died no later than early 1535.

== Legacy ==
Edward Seymour had ten more children by his second wife Anne Stanhope (c. 1510–1587), including his eventual heir Edward Seymour, 1st Earl of Hertford. When he was later created Duke of Somerset, his children by his first marriage were still considered legitimate, but the patent of nobility provides that the dukedom is to descend first to his heirs by Anne, and only in the event of the failure of that line to his heirs by his first wife, Catherine Filliol.

Her son John Seymour successfully petitioned Parliament for the restoration of his maternal inheritance, but as her lands had been sold, he was awarded compensation in the form of the estate of Maiden Bradley in Wiltshire, a former Augustinian priory in Wiltshire granted to his father at the Dissolution of the Monasteries by Henry VIII, which had descended to his half-siblings. However, he did not live to enjoy the grant and bequeathed it with all his other lands and goods to his younger brother Edward Seymour.

With the death of Algernon Seymour, 7th Duke of Somerset, in 1750, the Seymour Baronets of Berry Pomeroy Castle inherited the title of Duke of Somerset. Consequently, the present Duke of Somerset John Seymour, 19th Duke of Somerset is directly descended from Catherine Filliol.
