= Berry Pomeroy =

Village in Devon, England

Coordinates: 50.44°N 3.65°W

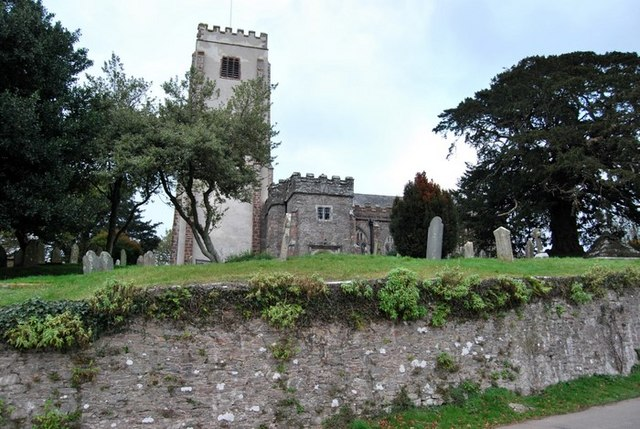
- St Mary's Church, Berry Pomeroy

- Location within Devon
- Population: 1,017 (2011)
- OS grid reference: SX828612
- Civil parish: Berry Pomeroy
- District: South Hams
- Shire county: Devon
- Region: South West
- Country: England
- Sovereign state: United Kingdom
- Post town: TOTNES
- Postcode district: TQ9
- Dialling code: 01803
- Police: Devon and Cornwall
- Fire: Devon and Somerset
- Ambulance: South Western
- UK Parliament: Totnes

Berry Pomeroy is a village and civil parish in the South Hams district of Devon, England, 2 miles (3 km) east of the town of Totnes. The parish is surrounded clockwise from the north by the parishes of Ipplepen, Marldon, Torbay (unitary authority), Stoke Gabriel, Ashprington, Totnes, and Littlehempston. In 2001 its population was 973, down from 1193 in 1901. The main road access is via the A385 road between Paignton and Totnes that runs through the parish, south of the village.

== History ==
Berry Pomeroy was the centre of the large feudal barony of Berry Pomeroy, which was held at the time of the Domesday Book (1086) by Ralph de Pomeroy. The Pomeroy family retained the barony until 1547.

William of Orange is said to have held his first parliament at Parliament Cottage in Longcombe within the parish, after landing at Brixham at the start of the Glorious Revolution in November 1688. He was afterwards entertained at Berry Pomeroy Castle by Sir Edward Seymour, 3rd Baronet.

Between 1681 and 1834 the village was served by just three vicars: John Prince, John Fox and John Edwards.

In World War II, American soldiers were stationed in the village during the build up to D-Day and were billeted in tents opposite the church, in which items of that time are on display. American veterans revisited Berry Pomeroy for the 60th anniversary of the invasion in 2004.

On 5 October 2019, more than fifty people were injured when a double-decker bus overturned at high speed on the A385 road in the parish.

== Berry Pomeroy Castle ==
Berry Pomeroy Castle, about one mile north-east of the village, was built as the home of the Pomeroy family probably in the late 15th century. In 1548 it was sold to Edward Seymour, 1st Duke of Somerset. The castle was abandoned in the late 17th century and was later considered a 'romantic ruin' by the Victorians. It is still owned by the Duke of Somerset, but is now maintained by English Heritage. The castle has often been cited as being the most haunted castle in Britain.

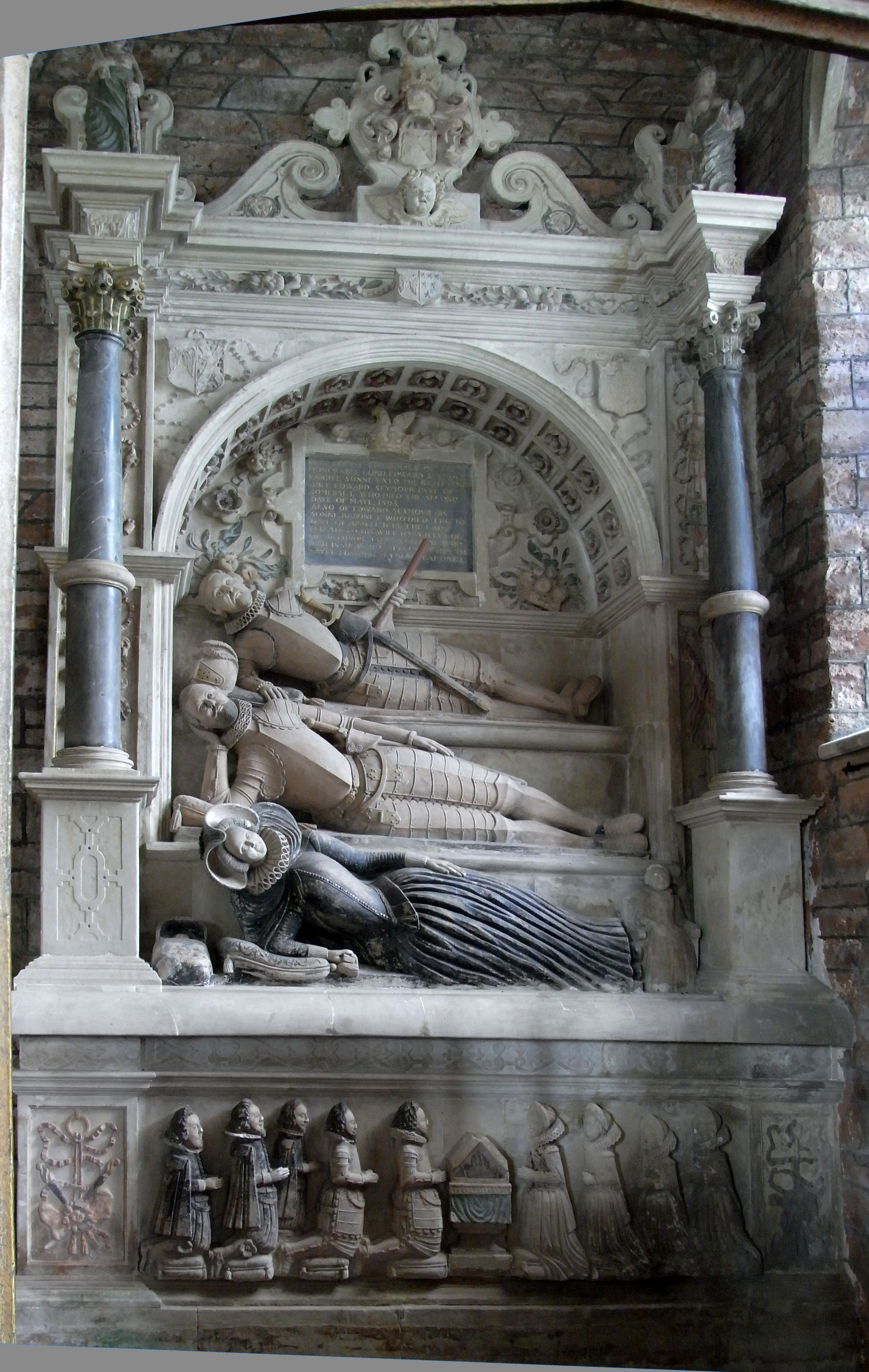
The monument to the Seymour family

== Parish church ==
St Mary's Church, in the village, has a rood screen forty-two feet long. Described by Pevsner as "one of the most perfect in Devon", it is unusual in being complete from the north to south walls and also in retaining its original coving, cornice and cresting. The wainscoting has painted figures. The stained-glass windows include a few reset old fragments, but are most notable for the panels by Christopher Whall (1897 and 1908) and by his daughter, Veronica Whall (1926).

Monuments in the church include a chest tomb to Sir Richard Pomeroy (died 1496) and his wife. Also a monument of 1613 to Lord Edward Seymour (died 1593) and his son, and daughter-in-law. The carving of its figures were described by Pevsner as "astonishingly naive".

A display as a remembrance of wartime events (WWII) is inside the church.

The church features in the final wedding scene of Ang Lee's 1995 film Sense and Sensibility.

== Today ==
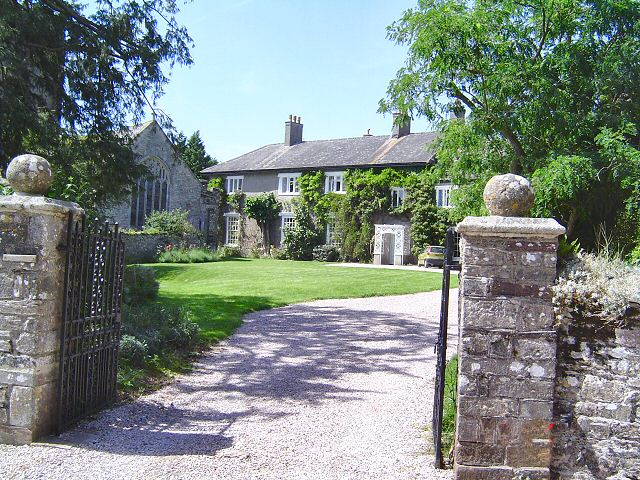
Manor House - Berry Pomeroy.

Berry Pomeroy's Parish Council meets at the Village Hall, next to Berry Pomeroy Parochial Primary School. Berry Pomeroy, along with nearby villages, is part of the East Dart ward which is represented by a councillor on the South Hams District Council.

Berry Pomeroy is also within the South Devon Area of Outstanding Natural Beauty (AONB).

To celebrate the Millennium in 2000, a new bench was erected opposite the War Memorial, and every summer, a fete is held in the grounds of the manor house next to the church, which includes maypole dancing, Devonshire cream teas and a coconut shy.

In 2005, Berry Pomeroy revived "Queene's Day", the anniversary of the accession of Elizabeth the First on 17 November. Celebrations begin with evensong in the parish church and culminate with a bonfire in the adjacent field, upon which is burned an effigy of Satan.
