= Tisbury Grange =

Former monastery in Wiltshire, England

Tisbury Grange was a priory in Wiltshire, England.

Records of it are scarce. Wintra, Abbot of Tisbury, is mentioned between 710 and 716, and the monastery is recorded in a charter of 759 which confirms a charter of 704. Its site is unknown; its lands were transferred to Shaftesbury Abbey in 984.
