= Queene's Day =

- Significance: accession of Queen Elizabeth I to the throne in 1558
- Date: 17 November
- Next time: 17 November 2025
- Frequency: annual

Queene's Day celebrates the accession of Queen Elizabeth I to the throne of England on 17 November 1558. Observance of the accession was a national holiday in England and Wales for about 300 years, often with the building of enormous bonfires. It was revived in the village of Berry Pomeroy in Devon in 2005.

Celebrations begin with evensong in St Mary's Church, Berry Pomeroy and culminate with a bonfire in the adjacent field, upon which is burned an effigy of the Devil.

== See also ==
- Accession Day tilt
