= John Stabb (ecclesiologist) =

English ecclesiologist and antiquary

John Stabb (1865–1917) of Torquay, Devon, England, was an ecclesiologist and antiquary of the county of Devon. He is best known for his three-volume publication Some Old Devon Churches, their Rood Screens, Pulpits, Fonts, etc. (1908, 1911, 1916), which he illustrated with several hundred of his own photographs.

== Career ==
Stabb was interested in ancient churches in Devon. He wrote and illustrated a series named Some Old Devon Churches. The first volume appeared in 1908, with 126 plates from photographs taken by himself, of rood screens, pulpits, fonts, bench ends, monuments, bells, and other objects of interest existing in each of the churches described by him. The second volume, with 162 plates, appeared in 1911. In 1916, the work was completed by the publication of vol. iii. with 112 plates and 400 illustrations, describing 264 churches in Devon.

Stabb was Treasurer of the Torquay Branch of the English Church Union, a member of the Guild of All Souls and of the Confraternity of the Blessed Sacrament. He was also a member of the Devonshire Association and of the Devon and Exeter Architectural Society, which he contributed to. At one time he was on the Committee of the Torquay Natural History Society, from which he retired on account of ill health, and occasionally lectured to.

He died at his residence Clanmarina, Torquay, on 2 August 1917, aged 52. He was buried in the Torquay Cemetery on 6 August 1917, a service at All Saints' Church, Babbacombe, preceding the funeral which was attended by numerous friends.

== List of works ==
- Some Old Devon Churches, Their Rood Screens, Pulpits, Fonts, Etc., 3 Vols., London: Vol 1, 1908, Index ; Vol.2, 1911; Vol.3, 1916.
- Devon Church antiquities: being a Description of Many Objects of Interest in the old Parish Churches of Devonshire. Vol 1. 1909.

== Sources ==
- Devon and Cornwall Notes and Queries, Vol.X, January 1918 - October 1919, pp. 18–19 (out of copyright text quoted)
