= Maiden Bradley Priory =

Augustinian priory in Wiltshire, England

Coordinates: 51°09′43.0″N 2°17′17.8″W

Maiden Bradley Priory was a priory in Wiltshire, England. It was founded as a leper colony in 1164, and in 1189 was handed over to the Augustinian order. It was dissolved in 1536. The last prior had six children, and claimed to have special permission from the pope to keep a "whore", according to the commissioners. He also told them that the nearby Glastonbury Thorn would flower on Christmas Eve, at the hour that Christ was born.
