= List of civil parishes in Wiltshire =

The civil parishes of Wiltshire

This is a list of civil parishes in the ceremonial county of Wiltshire, England. There are 275 civil parishes. The whole of the county is parished.

== Swindon ==
Since 2017, the Borough of Swindon (formerly Swindon Municipal Borough and the surrounding Highworth Rural District) is fully parished. There are 20 parishes:

Civil Parish	Civil Parish Population 2011	Area (km^{2}) 2011	Pre 1974 District
Bishopstone	693	22.98	Highworth Rural District
Blunsdon	12,414	18.05	Highworth Rural District
Castle Eaton	231	8.02	Highworth Rural District
Central Swindon North			
Chiseldon	2,667	21.58	Highworth Rural District
Covingham	3,566	0.90	Highworth Rural District
Hannington	240	10.38	Highworth Rural District
Haydon Wick	20,960	5.09	Highworth Rural District
Highworth (town)	8,151	26.15	Highworth Rural District
Inglesham	108	5.03	Highworth Rural District
Liddington	376	8.19	Highworth Rural District
Nythe, Eldene and Liden			
South Marston	836	7.74	Highworth Rural District
St Andrews			
South Swindon	62,871	16.04	
Stanton Fitzwarren	226	4.33	Highworth Rural District
Stratton St Margaret	22,698	9.30	Highworth Rural District
Wanborough	2,069	17.38	Highworth Rural District
West Swindon			
Wroughton	8,033	27.57	Highworth Rural District

South Swindon parish was created with the official name of Central Swindon South, but the parish council used the name and branding "South Swindon" from its creation. In October 2023, Swindon Borough Council consented to formally change the name to South Swindon.

== Wiltshire ==
The whole of the district is parished.

Civil Parish	Civil Parish Population 2011	Area (km^{2}) 2011	Pre 1974 District
Aldbourne	1,833	34.42	Marlborough and Ramsbury Rural District
Alderbury	2,223	9.15	Salisbury and Wilton Rural District
All Cannings	649	18.39	Devizes Rural District
Allington	493	10.70	Amesbury Rural District
Alton	249	10.32	Pewsey Rural District
Alvediston			Mere and Tisbury Rural District
Amesbury (town)	10,724	24.02	Amesbury Rural District
Ansty	117	5.59	Mere and Tisbury Rural District
Ashton Keynes	1,400	11.51	Cricklade and Wootton Bassett Rural District
Atworth	1,321	11.14	Bradford and Melksham Rural District
Avebury	615	22.47	Marlborough and Ramsbury Rural District
Barford St Martin	548	16.44	Salisbury and Wilton Rural District
Baydon	664	9.72	Marlborough and Ramsbury Rural District
Beechingstoke	157	2.93	Devizes Rural District
Berwick Bassett			Marlborough and Ramsbury Rural District
Berwick St James	142	10.12	Salisbury and Wilton Rural District
Berwick St John	438	28.68	Mere and Tisbury Rural District
Berwick St Leonard			Mere and Tisbury Rural District
Biddestone and Slaughterford	498	9.81	Calne and Chippenham Rural District
Bishops Cannings	1,784	35.98	Devizes Rural District
Bishopstone	684	23.61	Salisbury and Wilton Rural District
Bishopstrow	122	4.05	Warminster and Westbury Rural District
Bowerchalke	379	13.18	Salisbury and Wilton Rural District
Box	3,525	18.87	Calne and Chippenham Rural District
Boyton	244	21.28	Warminster and Westbury Rural District
Bradford-on-Avon (town)	9,402	8.67	Bradford on Avon Urban District
Bratton	1,248	14.95	Warminster and Westbury Rural District
Braydon	374	21.20	Cricklade and Wootton Bassett Rural District
Bremhill	967	31.14	Calne and Chippenham Rural District
Brinkworth	1,282	25.27	Malmesbury Rural District
Britford	592	8.70	Salisbury and Wilton Rural District
Brixton Deverill			Warminster and Westbury Rural District
Broad Chalke	680	28.17	Salisbury and Wilton Rural District
Broad Hinton	650	12.60	Marlborough and Ramsbury Rural District
Broad Town	574	8.25	Cricklade and Wootton Bassett Rural District
Brokenborough	190	10.87	Malmesbury Rural District
Bromham	1,846	19.13	Devizes Rural District
Broughton Gifford	851	6.58	Bradford and Melksham Rural District
Bulford	4,201	14.72	Amesbury Rural District
Bulkington	285	3.93	Warminster and Westbury Rural District
Burbage	1,772	17.43	Pewsey Rural District
Burcombe Without	156	7.07	Salisbury and Wilton Rural District
Buttermere	2,961	24.50	Marlborough and Ramsbury Rural District
Calne (town)	17,274	5.55	Calne Municipal Borough
Castle Combe	344	6.25	Calne and Chippenham Rural District
Chapmanslade	643	4.59	Warminster and Westbury Rural District
Charlton, Brinkworth	425	19.31	Malmesbury Rural District
Charlton St Peter	175	14.10	Pewsey Rural District
Cherhill	696	15.33	Calne and Chippenham Rural District
Cheverell Magna	987	7.46	Devizes Rural District
Chicklade			Mere and Tisbury Rural District
Chilmark	525	12.98	Mere and Tisbury Rural District
Chilton Foliat	363	8.91	Marlborough and Ramsbury Rural District
Chippenham Without	208	10.29	Calne and Chippenham Rural District
Chippenham (town)	35,800	13.46	Chippenham Municipal Borough
Chirton	406	7.79	Devizes Rural District
Chitterne	307	22.91	Warminster and Westbury Rural District
Cholderton	185	6.86	Amesbury Rural District
Christian Malford	705	10.87	Calne and Chippenham Rural District
Chute Forest	180	8.25	Pewsey Rural District
Chute	381	28.42	Pewsey Rural District
Clarendon Park	246	17.96	Salisbury and Wilton Rural District
Clyffe Pypard	289	13.23	Cricklade and Wootton Bassett Rural District
Codford	870	15.34	Warminster and Westbury Rural District
Colerne	2,972	15.66	Calne and Chippenham Rural District
Collingbourne Ducis	957	22.87	Pewsey Rural District
Collingbourne Kingston	511	20.18	Pewsey Rural District
Compton Bassett	258	10.41	Calne and Chippenham Rural District
Compton Chamberlayne	112	7.59	Salisbury and Wilton Rural District
Coombe Bissett	675	14.92	Salisbury and Wilton Rural District
Corsham (town)	13,004	26.60	Calne and Chippenham Rural District
Corsley	681	14.47	Warminster and Westbury Rural District
Coulston	158	8.02	Warminster and Westbury Rural District
Cricklade (town)	4,227	15.48	Cricklade and Wootton Bassett Rural District
Crudwell	1,057	19.82	Malmesbury Rural District
Dauntsey	590	13.48	Malmesbury Rural District
Derry Hill & Studley	2,796	42.86	Calne and Chippenham Rural District
Devizes (town)	17,005	13.79	Devizes Municipal Borough
Dilton Marsh	1,934	10.14	Warminster and Westbury Rural District
Dinton	696	14.16	Salisbury and Wilton Rural District
Donhead St Andrew	413	11.52	Mere and Tisbury Rural District
Donhead St Mary	1,155	21.11	Mere and Tisbury Rural District
Downton	3,073	29.56	Salisbury and Wilton Rural District
Durnford	368	13.25	Amesbury Rural District
Durrington	7,379	10.92	Amesbury Rural District
East Kennett			Marlborough and Ramsbury Rural District
East Knoyle	681	20.29	Mere and Tisbury Rural District
Easterton	524	12.31	Devizes Rural District
Easton Grey	253	8.97	Malmesbury Rural District
Easton (Easton Royal)			Pewsey Rural District
Ebbesborne Wake	222	15.22	Salisbury and Wilton Rural District
Edington	734	18.73	Warminster and Westbury Rural District
Enford	625	37.68	Pewsey Rural District
Erlestoke	210	8.33	Devizes Rural District
Etchilhampton	142	3.56	Devizes Rural District
Everleigh	211	13.28	Pewsey Rural District
Figheldean	628	22.01	Amesbury Rural District
Firsdown	581	5.28	Amesbury Rural District
Fittleton cum Haxton	261	13.00	Pewsey Rural District
Fonthill Bishop	140	11.05	Mere and Tisbury Rural District
Fonthill Gifford	102	6.22	Mere and Tisbury Rural District
Fovant	669	8.91	Salisbury and Wilton Rural District
Froxfield	382	9.27	Marlborough and Ramsbury Rural District
Fyfield	195	6.22	Marlborough and Ramsbury Rural District
Grafton	686	22.63	Marlborough and Ramsbury Rural District
Great Bedwyn	1,353	16.79	Marlborough and Ramsbury Rural District
Great Hinton	171	2.72	Warminster and Westbury Rural District
Great Somerford	737	6.71	Malmesbury Rural District
Great Wishford	368	6.81	Salisbury and Wilton Rural District
Grimstead	534	9.95	Salisbury and Wilton Rural District
Grittleton	539	18.18	Calne and Chippenham Rural District
Ham	210	13.72	Marlborough and Ramsbury Rural District
Hankerton	280	8.89	Malmesbury Rural District
Heddington	456	6.86	Calne and Chippenham Rural District
Heytesbury	773	39.53	Warminster and Westbury Rural District
Heywood	798	6.52	Warminster and Westbury Rural District
Hilmarton	749	21.09	Calne and Chippenham Rural District
Hilperton	4,967	7.66	Bradford and Melksham Rural District
Hindon	560	11.70	Mere and Tisbury Rural District
Holt	1,757	7.86	Bradford and Melksham Rural District
Horningsham	327	13.94	Warminster and Westbury Rural District
Hullavington	1,223	12.48	Malmesbury Rural District
Idmiston	2,130	22.21	Amesbury Rural District
Keevil	441	8.46	Warminster and Westbury Rural District
Kilmington	328	11.63	Mere and Tisbury Rural District
Kingston Deverill	331	28.46	Warminster and Westbury Rural District
Kington Langley	841	6.34	Calne and Chippenham Rural District
Kington St Michael	704	9.70	Calne and Chippenham Rural District
Knook			Warminster and Westbury Rural District
Lacock	1,159	15.40	Calne and Chippenham Rural District
Landford	1,271	11.04	Salisbury and Wilton Rural District
Langley Burrell Without	375	7.89	Calne and Chippenham Rural District
Latton	548	17.37	Cricklade and Wootton Bassett Rural District
Laverstock	5,472	8.96	Salisbury and Wilton Rural District
Lea and Cleverton	812	11.75	Malmesbury Rural District
Leigh	362	8.97	Cricklade and Wootton Bassett Rural District
Limpley Stoke	541	2.26	Bradford and Melksham Rural District
Little Bedwyn	250	17.11	Marlborough and Ramsbury Rural District
Little Cheverell	144	4.14	Devizes Rural District
Little Somerford	357	4.88	Malmesbury Rural District
Longbridge Deverill	821	22.28	Warminster and Westbury Rural District
Luckington	630	15.39	Malmesbury Rural District
Ludgershall (town)	4,427	7.81	Pewsey Rural District
Lydiard Millicent	1,570	6.29	Cricklade and Wootton Bassett Rural District
Lydiard Tregoze	495	16.00	Cricklade and Wootton Bassett Rural District
Lyneham and Bradenstoke	4,952	11.97	Cricklade and Wootton Bassett Rural District
Maiden Bradley with Yarnfield	331	18.62	Mere and Tisbury Rural District
Malmesbury (town)	5,380	2.83	Malmesbury Municipal Borough
Manningford	405	12.50	Pewsey Rural District
Marden	112	5.51	Devizes Rural District
Market Lavington	2,213	15.36	Devizes Rural District
Marlborough (town)	8,395	6.05	Marlborough Municipal Borough
Marston Meysey	207	5.33	Cricklade and Wootton Bassett Rural District
Marston	177	3.67	Devizes Rural District
Melksham Without	7,230	29.05	Bradford and Melksham Rural District
Melksham (town)	14,677	4.55	Melksham Urban District
Mere (town)			Mere and Tisbury Rural District
Mildenhall	477	16.87	Marlborough and Ramsbury Rural District
Milston	130	9.15	Amesbury Rural District
Milton Lilbourne	534	14.11	Pewsey Rural District
Minety	1,414	17.46	Malmesbury Rural District
Monkton Farleigh	460	7.53	Bradford and Melksham Rural District
Netheravon	1,060	14.29	Pewsey Rural District
Netherhampton	493	6.45	Salisbury and Wilton Rural District
Nettleton	693	16.22	Calne and Chippenham Rural District
Newton Tony	381	9.65	Amesbury Rural District
North Bradley	1,754	7.15	Warminster and Westbury Rural District
North Newnton	430	5.59	Pewsey Rural District
North Wraxall	401	9.24	Calne and Chippenham Rural District
Norton Bavant	116	7.49	Warminster and Westbury Rural District
Norton	201	12.64	Malmesbury Rural District
Oaksey	530	7.24	Malmesbury Rural District
Odstock	554	11.89	Salisbury and Wilton Rural District
Ogbourne St Andrew	417	21.78	Marlborough and Ramsbury Rural District
Ogbourne St George	495	14.44	Marlborough and Ramsbury Rural District
Orcheston	339	16.81	Amesbury Rural District
Patney	155	3.60	Devizes Rural District
Pewsey	3,634	19.09	Pewsey Rural District
Pitton and Farley	751	10.73	Salisbury and Wilton Rural District
Potterne	1,622	12.45	Devizes Rural District
Poulshot	370	6.21	Devizes Rural District
Preshute	193	16.34	Marlborough and Ramsbury Rural District
Purton	3,897	13.03	Cricklade and Wootton Bassett Rural District
Quidhampton	408	1.04	Salisbury and Wilton Rural District
Ramsbury	1,989	39.88	Marlborough and Ramsbury Rural District
Redlynch	3,448	25.59	Salisbury and Wilton Rural District
Rowde	1,382	10.49	Devizes Rural District
Royal Wootton Bassett (town)	11,385	20.48	Cricklade and Wootton Bassett Rural District
Rushall	143	8.92	Pewsey Rural District
Salisbury (city)	40,302	18.49	New Sarum Municipal Borough
Savernake	286	23.19	Marlborough and Ramsbury Rural District
Seagry	285	5.93	Calne and Chippenham Rural District
Sedgehill and Semley	601	16.83	Mere and Tisbury Rural District
Seend	1,132	11.47	Devizes Rural District
Semington	930	4.22	Bradford and Melksham Rural District
Shalbourne	558	19.65	Marlborough and Ramsbury Rural District
Sherrington			Warminster and Westbury Rural District
Sherston	1,639	17.12	Malmesbury Rural District
Shrewton	1,870	28.47	Amesbury Rural District
Sopworth	103	4.13	Malmesbury Rural District
South Newton	819	11.10	Salisbury and Wilton Rural District
South Wraxall	438	11.11	Bradford and Melksham Rural District
Southwick	1,953	9.12	Warminster and Westbury Rural District
St Paul Malmesbury Without	2,059	27.03	Malmesbury Rural District
Stanton St Bernard	189	8.25	Devizes Rural District
Stanton St Quintin	851	7.31	Calne and Chippenham Rural District
Stapleford	264	8.56	Salisbury and Wilton Rural District
Staverton	1,868	1.76	Bradford and Melksham Rural District
Steeple Ashton	935	10.29	Warminster and Westbury Rural District
Steeple Langford	515	20.39	Salisbury and Wilton Rural District
Stert	176	4.17	Devizes Rural District
Stockton	204	13.32	Warminster and Westbury Rural District
Stourton with Gasper	192	13.45	Mere and Tisbury Rural District
Stratford Tony			Salisbury and Wilton Rural District
Sutton Benger	1,045	7.76	Calne and Chippenham Rural District
Sutton Mandeville	232	8.16	Mere and Tisbury Rural District
Sutton Veny	734	16.02	Warminster and Westbury Rural District
Swallowcliffe	174	5.45	Mere and Tisbury Rural District
Teffont	248	9.93	Mere and Tisbury Rural District
Tidcombe and Fosbury			Marlborough and Ramsbury Rural District
Tidworth (town)	10,621	21.87	Andover Rural District
Tilshead	358	15.68	Amesbury Rural District
Tisbury (town)	2,233	16.36	Mere and Tisbury Rural District
Tockenham	219	5.11	Cricklade and Wootton Bassett Rural District
Tollard Royal	115	7.50	Mere and Tisbury Rural District
Trowbridge (town)	32,304	9.55	Trowbridge Urban District
Upavon	1,190	9.00	Pewsey Rural District
Upton Lovell	165	5.76	Warminster and Westbury Rural District
Upton Scudamore	295	9.52	Warminster and Westbury Rural District
Urchfont	1,075	19.28	Devizes Rural District
Warminster (town)	17,490	22.90	Warminster Urban District
West Ashton	737	8.21	Warminster and Westbury Rural District
West Dean	252	11.89	Salisbury and Wilton Rural District
West Knoyle	146	8.15	Mere and Tisbury Rural District
West Lavington	1,502	23.95	Devizes Rural District
West Overton	637	16.99	Marlborough and Ramsbury Rural District
West Tisbury	573	11.29	Mere and Tisbury Rural District
Westbury (town)	14,709	14.92	Westbury Urban District
Westwood	1,162	3.86	Bradford and Melksham Rural District
Whiteparish	1,504	24.19	Salisbury and Wilton Rural District
Wilcot, Huish and Oare	558	14.60	Pewsey Rural District
Wilsford cum Lake	101	9.27	Amesbury Rural District
Wilsford			Pewsey Rural District
Wilton (town)	3,579	10.61	Wilton Municipal Borough
Wingfield	321	8.18	Bradford and Melksham Rural District
Winsley	1,920	7.95	Bradford and Melksham Rural District
Winterbourne Bassett	159	8.85	Marlborough and Ramsbury Rural District
Winterbourne Monkton	203	13.10	Marlborough and Ramsbury Rural District
Winterbourne Stoke	205	14.41	Amesbury Rural District
Winterbourne	1,238	10.90	Amesbury Rural District
Winterslow	2,064	20.52	Salisbury and Wilton Rural District
Woodborough	292	4.16	Pewsey Rural District
Woodford	443	13.20	Amesbury Rural District
Wootton Rivers	228	7.05	Pewsey Rural District
Worton	624	3.96	Devizes Rural District
Wylye	412	16.19	Salisbury and Wilton Rural District
Yatton Keynell	825	7.12	Calne and Chippenham Rural District
Zeals	658	6.43	Mere and Tisbury Rural District
Lands common to the parishes of Broughton Gifford and Melksham Without			

== See also ==
- List of places in Swindon
- List of places in Wiltshire
- List of settlements in Wiltshire by population
