= List of places in Wiltshire =

The eight most populous settlements of Wiltshire

This is a list of cities, towns and villages in the ceremonial county of Wiltshire, England.

== A ==
- Ablington
- Addeston
- Alcombe
- Aldbourne
- Alderbury
- Alderton
- All Cannings
- Allington (near Chippenham)
- Allington (near Devizes)
- Allington (near Salisbury)
- Alton Barnes
- Alton Priors
- Alvediston
- Amesbury
- Ansty
- Ashley
- Ashton Gifford
- Ashton Keynes
- Asserton
- Atworth
- Aughton
- Avebury
- Avon
- Avoncliff
- Axford

== B ==
- Badbury
- Badbury Wick
- Bagshot, Wiltshire
- Bapton
- Barford St Martin
- Barrow Street
- Bathampton
- Baverstock
- Baydon
- Beanacre
- Beardwell
- Bearfield
- Beechingstoke
- Bemerton
- Berryfield
- Berwick Bassett
- Berwick St James
- Berwick St John
- Berwick St Leonard
- Beversbrook
- Biddesden
- Biddestone
- Bigley
- Birdbush
- Bishop Fowley
- Bishops Cannings
- Bishopstone near Salisbury
- Bishopstone near Swindon
- Bishopstrow
- Blackland
- Blagdon Hill
- Blunsdon St Andrew
- Bodenham
- Bonham
- Boreham
- Boscombe
- Bottlesford
- Bowerchalke
- Bowerhill
- Bowood House
- Box
- Boyton
- Bradenstoke
- Bradford Leigh
- Bradford on Avon
- Bratton
- Braydon
- Bremhill
- Bridmore
- Brigmerston
- Brinkworth
- Britford
- Brixton Deverill
- Broad Blunsdon
- Broad Chalke
- Broad Hinton
- Broad Town
- Brokenborough
- Brokerswood
- Bromham
- Broughton Gifford
- Brunton
- Bugley
- Bugmore
- Bulbridge
- Bulford
- Bulkington
- Bullenhill
- Bupton
- Burbage
- Burcombe
- Burderop
- Burton
- Bushton
- Buttermere

== C ==
- Calne
- Castle Combe
- Castle Eaton
- Chapmanslade
- Charlton, Brinkworth
- Charlton, Pewsey Vale
- Charlton-All-Saints
- Cherhill
- Chicklade
- Chilmark
- Chilton Foliat
- Chippenham
- Chirton
- Chisbury
- Chiseldon
- Chitterne
- Chittoe
- Cholderton
- Christian Malford
- Chute Cadley
- Chute Forest
- Coate
- Codford
- Colerne
- Collingbourne Ducis
- Collingbourne Kingston
- Compton Bassett
- Compton Chamberlayne
- Coombe (near Donhead St Mary)
- Coombe (near Enford)
- Coombe Bissett
- Corsham
- Corsley
- Corston, Wiltshire
- Coulston
- Covingham
- Cricklade
- Croucheston
- Crudwell

== D ==
- Dauntsey
- Dauntsey Lock
- Devizes
- Dilton Marsh
- Dinton
- Ditteridge
- Donhead St Andrew
- Donhead St Mary
- Downton
- Durrington
- Derry Hill
- Draycot Cerne
- Draycot Foliat

== E ==
- East Chisenbury
- East Everleigh
- East Grafton
- East Grimstead
- East Kennett
- East Knoyle
- Easterton
- Easton Grey
- Easton Royal
- Ebbesbourne Wake
- Edington
- Enford
- Erlestoke
- Etchilhampton
- Everleigh

== F ==
- Figheldean
- Fifield
- Fifield Bavant
- Firsdown
- Fisherton Delamere
- Fittleton
- Fonthill Bishop
- Fonthill Gifford
- Ford (North Wiltshire)
- Ford (Laverstock and Ford)
- Fosbury
- Fovant
- Foxham
- Foxley
- Froxfield
- Fugglestone St Peter
- Fyfield
- Fyfield (Pewsey)

== G ==
- Gasper
- Goatacre
- Great Bedwyn
- Great Chalfield
- Great Cheverell
- Great Durnford
- Great Hinton
- Great Somerford
- Great Wishford
- Greatfield
- Green Hill, Wiltshire
- Grittleton
- Gastard

== H ==
- Hannington
- Hannington Wick
- Haydon Wick
- Ham
- Ham Hill
- Hampton
- Hamptworth
- Harnham
- Hawkstreet
- Haxton
- Hayes Knoll
- Heytesbury
- Heywood
- Highworth
- Hilmarton
- Hilperton
- Hindon
- Hinton Parva
- Hodson
- Holt
- Honeystreet
- Horningsham
- Horton
- Huish
- Hullavington

== I ==
Imber

== K ==
- Keevil
- Kilmington
- Kington Langley
- Kington St Michael
- Knook

== L ==
- Lacock
- Lacock Abbey
- Lake
- Langley Burrell
- Larkhill
- Laverstock
- Lea
- Leigh Delamere
- Liddington
- Limpley Stoke
- Little Bedwyn
- Little Cheverell
- Little Salisbury
- Little Somerford
- Littlecote House
- Littlecott
- Littleton Drew
- Littleworth
- Lockeridge
- Longbridge Deverill
- Longstreet
- Lover
- Lower Chute
- Lower Everleigh
- Lower Woodford
- Ludgershall
- Ludwell
- Lydeway
- Lydiard Millicent
- Lydiard Tregoze
- Lyneham

== M ==
- Maddington
- Maiden Bradley
- Malmesbury
- The Manningfords
- Manton
- Marden
- Market Lavington
- Marlborough
- Marlborough Downs
- Marston
- Marston Meysey
- Marten
- Melksham
- Mere
- Middle Woodford
- Milbourne
- Mile Elm
- Milton Lilbourne
- Mildenhall
- Minety
- Monkton Farleigh
- Morgan's Vale
- Mountain Bower

== N ==
- Neston
- Nettleton
- Netherstreet
- Netheravon
- New Town
- New Zealand
- Nine Elms
- Nomansland
- North Bradley
- North Tidworth
- North Wraxall
- Norton Bavant
- Notton
- Nunton

== O ==
- Oare
- Odstock
- Ogbourne St George
- Ogbourne St Andrew
- Ogbourne Maizey
- Old Dilton
- Oxenwood
- Oaksey

== P ==
- Patney
- Paxcroft Mead
- Perham Down
- Pertwood
- Pewsey
- Pitton
- Potterne
- Poulshot
- Poulton
- Purton
- Purton Stoke

== R ==
- Ramsbury
- Redlynch
- Restrop
- Ridge
- Rivar
- Rockley
- Rollestone
- Roundway
- Royal Wootton Bassett
- Rowde
- Rushall

== S ==
- St Andrews
- St. Edith's Marsh
- Salisbury
- Sandridge
- Sandy Lane
- Seagry Heath
- Sedgehill
- Seend
- Sells Green
- Semley
- Sevenhampton
- Sevington
- Shalbourne
- Shaw
- Sherrington
- Sherston
- Shrewton
- Slaughterford
- Snap
- Sopworth
- South Marston
- South Newton
- Stanton St Bernard
- Stanton St Quintin
- Stapleford
- Startley
- Steeple Ashton
- Steeple Langford
- Stert
- Stitchcombe
- Stockley
- Stockton
- Stourton
- Stratford-sub-Castle
- Stratford Tony
- Stype
- Sutton Benger
- Sutton Mandeville
- Sutton Veny
- Swallowcliffe
- Swanborough
- Swindon

== T ==
- Teffont Evias
- Teffont Magna
- The Shoe
- The Strand
- Tidcombe
- Tiddleywink
- Tidworth
- Tilshead
- Tisbury
- Tockenham
- Tollard Royal
- Trowbridge
- Tytherington

== U ==
- Upavon
- Upper Chute
- Upper Seagry
- Upper Upham
- Upper Woodford
- Upper Wraxall
- Upton Lovell
- Upton Scudamore
- Urchfont

== V ==
Vale of Pewsey

== W ==
- Wanborough
- Wardour
- Warminster
- Washpool
- Wedhampton
- West Ashton
- West Chisenbury
- West Dean
- West Grafton
- West Grimstead
- West Kennett
- West Kington
- West Knoyle
- West Lavington
- West Overton
- West Stowell
- Westbrook
- Westbury
- Westwood
- Wexcombe
- Whaddon (near Salisbury)
- Whaddon (near Trowbridge)
- Whiteparish
- Whitley
- Widham
- Wilcot
- Wilsford (near Amesbury)
- Wilsford (near Pewsey)
- Wilton (near Salisbury)
- Wilton (near Marlborough)
- Wingfield
- Winsley
- Winterbourne Bassett
- Winterbourne Dauntsey
- Winterbourne Earls
- Winterbourne Gunner
- Winterbourne Monkton
- Winterbourne Stoke
- Winterslow
- Woodborough
- Woodfalls
- Wootton Rivers
- Worton
- Wroughton
- Wylye

== Y ==
- Yarnbrook
- Yatesbury
- Yatton Keynell

== Z ==
Zeals

== See also ==
- List of settlements in Wiltshire by population
- List of civil parishes in Wiltshire
- List of places in England
