= West Wiltshire District Council elections =

Local government elections in Wiltshire, England

West Wiltshire was a non-metropolitan district in Wiltshire, England. It was abolished on 1 April 2009 and replaced by Wiltshire Council.

== Political control ==
From the first election to the council in 1973 until its abolition in 2009, political control of the council was held by the following parties:

Party in control	Years
No overall control	1973–1979
Conservative	1979–1991
Liberal Democrats	1991–2003
No overall control	2003–2007
Conservative	2007–2009

=== Leadership ===
The leaders of the council from 2003 until the council's abolition in 2009 was:

Councillor	Party	From	To
Tony Phillips	Independent	14 May 2003	11 May 2005
Sarah Content	Liberal Democrats	11 May 2005	May 2007
Graham Payne	Conservative	16 May 2007	31 Mar 2009

== Council elections ==
- 1973 West Wiltshire District Council election
- 1976 West Wiltshire District Council election
- 1979 West Wiltshire District Council election
- 1983 West Wiltshire District Council election (New ward boundaries)
- 1987 West Wiltshire District Council election
- 1991 West Wiltshire District Council election
- 1995 West Wiltshire District Council election
- 1999 West Wiltshire District Council election
- 2003 West Wiltshire District Council election (New ward boundaries)
- 2007 West Wiltshire District Council election (New ward boundaries)

== Results maps ==
2003 results map

2007 results map

== By-election results ==
=== 1995–1999 ===
Adcroft By-Election 14 November 1996
Party	Candidate	Votes	%	±%
Labour		198	41.3	
Liberal Democrats		144	30.1	
Conservative		137	28.6	
Majority		54	11.2	
Turnout		479		
Labour gain from Liberal Democrats		Swing		

College By-Election 14 November 1996
Party	Candidate	Votes	%	±%
Labour	Jeffrey Bryan Osborn	325	35.4	
Conservative		284	30.9	
Liberal Democrats		246	26.8	
Independent		63	6.9	
Majority		41	4.5	
Turnout		918		
Labour gain from Liberal Democrats		Swing		

Adcroft By-Election 11 September 1997
Party	Candidate	Votes	%	±%
Liberal Democrats	Debra Hawken	151	29.8	−6.0
Labour		112	22.1	−8.7
Independent	Anthony Jay	110	21.7	+4.5
Conservative		79	15.6	−0.7
Independent		54	10.7	+10.7
Majority		39	7.7	
Turnout		506	20.6	
Liberal Democrats gain from Labour		Swing		

Drynham By-Election 12 November 1998
Party	Candidate	Votes	%	±%
Liberal Democrats	Marcus Francis	334	44.1	+16.9
Conservative		182	24.0	−6.3
Independent	Frederick Anthony Durrant	113	14.9	+0.9
Labour		84	11.1	−17.5
Green		45	5.9	+5.9
Majority		152	20.1	
Turnout		758	18.5	
Liberal Democrats gain from Labour		Swing		

=== 1999–2003 ===
Blackmore Forest By-Election 14 September 2000
Party	Candidate	Votes	%	±%
Conservative	Andrew Milton	337	53.7	+15.6
Liberal Democrats		290	46.3	+8.0
Majority		47	7.4	
Turnout		627	17.8	
Conservative gain from Liberal Democrats		Swing		

Westbury and Storridge By-Election 17 October 2002
Party	Candidate	Votes	%	±%
Liberal Democrats	Michael Raymond Pearce	694	36.3	−1.9
Conservative	Russell Mark Jonathan Hawker	659	34.4	+10.1
Labour	Michael Sutton	561	29.3	+7.4
Majority		35	1.9	
Turnout		1,914	22.6	
Liberal Democrats hold		Swing		

=== 2003–2007 ===
Melksham North By-Election 15 July 2004
Party	Candidate	Votes	%	±%
Labour	Vic Oakman	373	44.7	+13.3
Conservative	Kenneth Williams	237	28.4	+28.4
Liberal Democrats	Malcolm Paton	224	26.9	−30.1
Majority		136	16.3	
Turnout		834	19.8	
Labour gain from Liberal Democrats		Swing		

Trowbridge College By-Election 15 July 2004
Party	Candidate	Votes	%	±%
Liberal Democrats	Sarah Content	416	52.7	+5.1
Conservative	Peter Fuller	283	35.8	+1.8
Green	Timothy Unsworth	52	6.6	−4.0
Independent	Liam Silcocks	39	4.9	−2.7
Majority		133	16.9	
Turnout		790	20.0	
Liberal Democrats hold		Swing		

Warminster East By-Election 20 April 2006
Party	Candidate	Votes	%	±%
Liberal Democrats	David Lovell	777	44.3	+23.6
Conservative	William Parks	736	42.0	−14.6
Independent	Michael Turner	121	6.9	−3.7
Independent	May Law	120	6.8	+6.8
Majority		41	2.3	
Turnout		1,754	28.6	
Liberal Democrats gain from Conservative		Swing		

Warminster West By-Election 2 November 2006
Party	Candidate	Votes	%	±%
Conservative	Philippa Ridout	572		
Liberal Democrats	Roger John Coveney	448		
Independent	Michael Turner	332		
Majority		124		
Turnout		1,342	21.2	
Conservative gain from Independent		Swing		

=== 2007–2009 ===
Trowbridge Central By-Election 10 July 2008
Party	Candidate	Votes	%	±%
Conservative	David Halik	452	55.3	+21.9
Liberal Democrats	John Knight	366	44.7	+3.8
Majority		86	10.6	
Turnout		818	18.1	
Conservative gain from Liberal Democrats		Swing		
