= West Wiltshire =

Former local government district in Wiltshire, England

Coordinates: 51°19′N 2°13′W

West Wiltshire District
- Shown within Wiltshire
- Area
  - 2009: 516.92 km^{2} (Ranked 96th)
- Population
  - 2009: ?
  - Ethnicity: 98.1% White
- History
  - Created: 1 April 1974
  - Abolished: 1 April 2009
  - Succeeded by: Wiltshire Council
- Status: District
- ONS code: 46UF
- Government: West Wiltshire District Council
  - Type: Leader & Committees, later Leader & Cabinet
  - HQ: Trowbridge
- Contained within
  - Region: South West England
  - Admin. County: Wiltshire

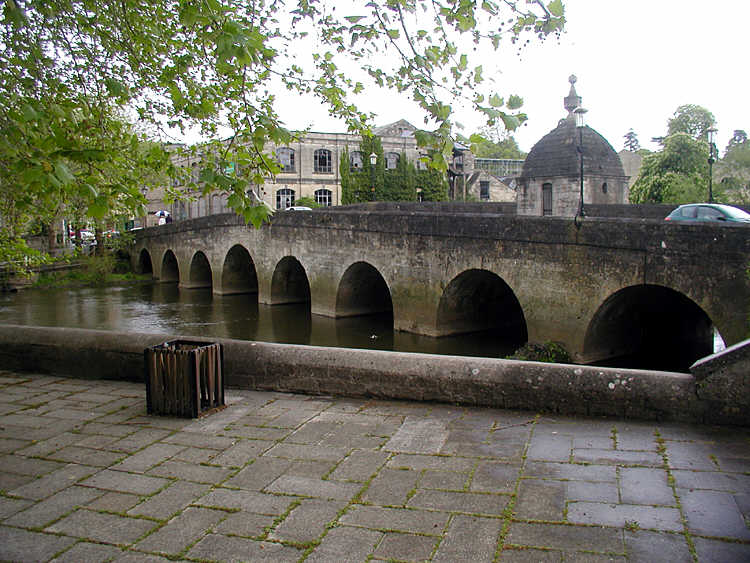
Bridge over the River Avon at Bradford-on-Avon

West Wiltshire was a local government district in Wiltshire, England, between 1974 and 2009, when it was superseded by the new Wiltshire unitary area.

The district was formed on 1 April 1974, further to the Local Government Act 1972, as a merger of the former urban districts of Bradford-on-Avon, Melksham, Trowbridge, Warminster and Westbury, along with Bradford and Melksham Rural District and the Warminster and Westbury Rural District. There were five towns in the district – Bradford-on-Avon, Melksham, Trowbridge, Warminster and Westbury – each surrounded by rural parishes. About two-thirds of the district's population was in those towns.

The district council was based at purpose-built offices in Bradley Road, Trowbridge. It was abolished on 1 April 2009 as part of the structural changes to local government in England, when its functions were taken over by the new Wiltshire unitary authority.

== District Council ==
West Wiltshire District Council had forty-four members, all elected together for a four-year term of office. The first elections were held in 1973 and the last in 2007.

=== Political control ===
Initially, in 1973, the district council had no overall control. The Conservatives took control during the 1980s, and then the Liberal Democrats from 1991 to 2003. At the elections of May 2003, 19 Conservatives, 19 Liberal Democrats, two Labour members and four Independents were elected. In this hung council, an administration of Conservatives and Independents led by Councillor A. G. Phillips (Independent) held office from May 2003 to May 2005, followed by a coalition of Liberal Democrats and Independents led by Councillor Sarah Content (Liberal Democrat), from May 2005 to May 2007. At the elections of May 2007, 26 Conservatives, 14 Liberal Democrats, and four Independents were elected as members of the Council, giving the Conservatives overall control for the first time since 1990. The Conservatives appointed Graham Payne (Conservative) as Leader and A. G. Phillips (by now also a Conservative) as Deputy Leader.

== Parliamentary representation ==
At the parliamentary level, most of the district of West Wiltshire was in the Westbury constituency, with the remaining two parishes coming under Devizes. Throughout the district's existence, both seats were held by Conservative Members of Parliament, latterly Andrew Murrison (Westbury) and Michael Ancram (Devizes).

== Parishes and settlements ==
The district contained the following civil parishes:

- Atworth
- Bishopstrow, Boyton, Bradford-on-Avon, Bratton, Brixton Deverill, Broughton Gifford, Bulkington
- Chapmanslade, Chitterne, Codford, Corsley, Coulston
- Dilton Marsh
- Edington
- Great Hinton
- Heytesbury, Heywood, Hilperton, Holt, Horningsham
- Keevil, Knook
- Limpley Stoke, Longbridge Deverill
- Melksham, Melksham Without, Monkton Farleigh
- North Bradley, Norton Bavant
- Semington, Sherrington, South Wraxall, Southwick, Staverton, Steeple Ashton, Stockton, Sutton Veny
- Trowbridge
- Upton Lovell, Upton Scudamore
- Warminster, West Ashton, Westbury, Westwood, Wingfield, Winsley

The district also contained the former parish of Imber and the country estates of Ashton Gifford and Longleat.

== See also ==
- Wiltshire County Council
