= Warminster and Westbury Rural District =

Former local government area in the UK

Coordinates: 51.24°N 2.19°W

The Warminster and Westbury Rural District was a rural district in Wiltshire, England from 1935 to 1974.

With effect from 1935, it was formed by a County Review Order under the Local Government Act 1929 as a merger of the Warminster Rural District and the Westbury and Whorwellsdown Rural District. It entirely surrounded the urban districts of Warminster and Westbury.

The district included the parishes of Bishopstrow, Boyton, Bratton, Brixton Deverill, Bulkington, Chapmanslade, Chitterne, Codford, Corsley, Dilton Marsh, East Coulston, Edington, Great Hinton, Heytesbury, Heywood, Horningsham, Imber, Keevil, Kingston Deverill, Knook, Longbridge Deverill, North Bradley, Norton Bavant, Sherrington, Southwick, Steeple Ashton, Stockton, Sutton Veny, Upton Lovell, Upton Scudamore, and West Ashton.

In 1974, it was abolished as a result of the Local Government Act 1972, the whole of its area becoming part of the new West Wiltshire district.
