= 2007 West Wiltshire District Council election =

2007 UK local government election

- 3 May 2007

All 44 seats to West Wiltshire District Council 23 seats needed for a majority
	First party	Second party	Third party
	Con	LD	Ind
Party	Conservative	Liberal Democrats	Independent
Last election	19 seats, 36.9%	19 seats, 35.6%	4 seats, 13.0%
Seats won	26	14	4
Seat change	▲7	▼5	Steady
Popular vote	17,339	12,040	4,687
Percentage	48.1%	33.4%	12.6%
Swing	▲11.2%	▼2.2%	▼0.4%
- Results of the 2007 West Wiltshire District Council election
Council control before election
No overall control
Council control after election
Conservative

Elections to West Wiltshire District Council were held on 3 May 2007. The whole council was up for election and the Conservatives took control.

Most wards had boundary changes or were new. One ward, Shearwater, was uncontested.

Of the 44 new members, 21 were not members of the outgoing council.

The district councillors were elected on 3 May 2007 for a four-year term of office, but a review of local government determined in 2008 that the four district councils of Wiltshire should be merged with Wiltshire County Council to form a new unitary authority for Wiltshire with effect from 1 April 2009, when the district councillors' term of office would end. The county council was treated as a "continuing authority", and elections to the new Wiltshire Council unitary council took place in June 2009.

== Results ==
Result of West Wiltshire District Council elections, 2007
Party	Seats	Gains	Losses	Net gain/loss	Seats %	Votes %	Votes	+/−
Conservative	26			+9	59.1	49.5	32,397	+ 8.0%
Liberal Democrats	14			-4	31.8	36.5	23,895	– 1.4%
Independent	4			-2	9.1	7.7	5,020	– 1.3%
Labour	0	0	3	-3	0	4.6	2,988	– 1.0%
UKIP	0	0	0	0	0	1.8	1,197	+ 1.8%
Green	0	0	0	0	0	0	0	– 5.9%

== Ward results ==
=== Atworth, Whitley and South Wraxall ===
Atworth, Whitley and South Wraxall
Party	Candidate	Votes	%	±%
Independent	Terry Chivers	616	55.6	
Conservative	Colin Henry Callow	386	34.9	
Liberal Democrats	Peter Hayes	105	9.5	
Majority		430	38.8	
Turnout		1,107	46.9	
Independent gain from Liberal Democrats		Swing		

=== Avonside ===
Avonside (3 seats)
Party	Candidate	Votes	%	±%
Independent	Ernie Clark	1,514		
Liberal Democrats	Trevor William Carbin	1,129		
Conservative	David James Binding	902		
Conservative	Marion Mortimer	871		
Liberal Democrats	Ian James Crook	837		
Liberal Democrats	Fran Lewis	677		
Conservative	Bob Munden	555		
Majority		31		
Turnout			42.5	
Independent win (new seat)				
Liberal Democrats win (new seat)				
Conservative win (new seat)				

=== Bradford-on-Avon North ===
Bradford-on-Avon North (2 seats)
Party	Candidate	Votes	%	±%
Liberal Democrats	David John Bolwell	1,137		
Liberal Democrats	Janet Lindsay Repton	1,119		
Conservative	Sheila Allen	892		
Conservative	Neil Cocking	792		
Majority		245		
Turnout			48.1	
Liberal Democrats hold		Swing		
Liberal Democrats hold		Swing		

=== Bradford-on-Avon South ===
Bradford-on-Avon South (2 seats)
Party	Candidate	Votes	%	±%
Liberal Democrats	Isabel Catherine Martindale	998		
Liberal Democrats	Rosemary Brown	997		
Conservative	Gwen Allison	966		
Conservative	Mike Roberts	950		
Majority		31		
Turnout			46.2	
Liberal Democrats hold		Swing		
Liberal Democrats hold		Swing		

=== Dilton ===
Dilton
Party	Candidate	Votes	%	±%
Conservative	Linda Conley	476	48.3	
Liberal Democrats	Alison Mary Irving	371	37.7	
Independent	Francis Morland	77	7.8	
UKIP	Keith Malcolm Green	61	6.2	
Majority		105	10.7	
Turnout		985	43.5	
Conservative win (new seat)				

=== Ethandune ===
Ethandune
Party	Candidate	Votes	%	±%
Conservative	Julie Swabey	855	76.3	
Liberal Democrats	Alan Rigg	265	23.7	
Majority		590	52.7	
Turnout		1120	44.9	
Conservative hold		Swing		

=== Manor Vale ===
Manor Vale
Party	Candidate	Votes	%	±%
Conservative	Carolyn Joy Walker	676	63.3	
Liberal Democrats	Richard George Crofts	392	36.7	
Majority		284	26.6	
Turnout		1068	43.2	
Conservative hold		Swing		

=== Melksham East ===
Melksham East (2 seats)
Party	Candidate	Votes	%	±%
Conservative	Philip Alford	533		
Conservative	Mark Griffiths	520		
Liberal Democrats	Terri Welch	476		
Labour	Vic Oakman	411		
Labour	Tony Palmer	319		
Majority		44		
Turnout			29.0	
Conservative win (new seat)				
Conservative win (new seat)				

=== Melksham Spa ===
Melksham Spa (2 seats)
Party	Candidate	Votes	%	±%
Conservative	Geoffrey Carr	689		
Conservative	Brian Mudge	642		
Liberal Democrats	Steve Petty	536		
Labour	Louise Anne Smith	402		
Labour	Gordon Cox	365		
Majority		106		
Turnout			32.2	
Conservative hold		Swing		
Conservative hold		Swing		

=== Melksham Without ===
Melksham Without (3 seats)
Party	Candidate	Votes	%	±%
Conservative	Richard Wiltshire	861		
Conservative	Roy Sidney While	813		
Conservative	Rod Eaton	773		
Liberal Democrats	Jon Hubbard	345		
Labour	Margaret White	322		
Liberal Democrats	Sarah Content	310		
Labour	Jim McGee	276		
Liberal Democrats	John Landell Mills	247		
UKIP	Paul Robert Carter	253		
UKIP	David Gordon Sedgewick	222		
Majority		432		
Turnout			30.0	
Conservative hold		Swing		
Conservative hold		Swing		
Conservative win (new seat)				

=== Mid Wylye Valley ===
Mid Wylye Valley
Party	Candidate	Votes	%	±%
Independent	Christopher Newbury	591	50.3	
Conservative	Steve Welling	464	39.5	
UKIP	Charlotte Kirsten Mozley	121	10.3	
Majority		127	10.8	
Turnout		1,176	52.8	
Independent hold		Swing		

=== Shearwater ===
Shearwater
Party	Candidate	Votes	%	±%
Conservative	Michael Mounde	unopposed	n/a	n/a
Conservative hold		Swing		

=== Summerham ===
Summerham
Party	Candidate	Votes	%	±%
Conservative	Virginia Fortescue	686	75.7	
Liberal Democrats	Mark Gregory Littledale	420	24.3	
Majority		266	29.4	
Turnout		906	48.4	
Conservative hold		Swing		

=== Trowbridge and North Bradley ===
Trowbridge and North Bradley
Party	Candidate	Votes	%	±%
Conservative	Graham David Payne	589	66.6	
Liberal Democrats	Marcus Alexander Francis	295	33.4	
Majority		294	33.2	
Turnout		884	38.4	
Conservative win (new seat)				

=== Trowbridge and Southwick ===
Trowbridge and Southwick
Party	Candidate	Votes	%	±%
Conservative	Tony Phillips	453	59.4	
Liberal Democrats	Bob Brice	310	40.6	
Majority		143	18.8	
Turnout		884	38.4	
Conservative win (new seat)				

=== Trowbridge Central ===
Trowbridge Central (2 seats)
Party	Candidate	Votes	%	±%
Liberal Democrats	Graham Thomas Hedley	548		
Liberal Democrats	Terry Couchman	525		
Conservative	George Chamulewicz	448		
Conservative	Geoffrey Kenneth Whiffen	433		
Independent	Sarah Jane Beatrice Newbury	344		
Independent	Tony Durrant	333		
Majority		77		
Turnout			29.7	
Liberal Democrats win (new seat)				
Liberal Democrats win (new seat)				

=== Trowbridge East ===
Trowbridge East (3 seats)
Party	Candidate	Votes	%	±%
Conservative	Peter Fuller	812		
Conservative	Derek Coop	798		
Liberal Democrats	Andrew James Bryant	786		
Conservative	Trace Senior	749		
Liberal Democrats	Paul William Scrimgeour	677		
Liberal Democrats	Rollie Cleere	672		
Majority		37		
Turnout			31.0	
Conservative win (new seat)				
Conservative win (new seat)				
Liberal Democrats win (new seat)				

=== Trowbridge North East ===
Trowbridge North East (2 seats)
Party	Candidate	Votes	%	±%
Liberal Democrats	Nicholas Blakemore	672		
Liberal Democrats	Tom James	667		
Conservative	Richard Arthur Ing	621		
Conservative	Stephen Nash	606		
Majority		46		
Turnout			32.6	
Liberal Democrats win (new seat)				
Liberal Democrats win (new seat)				

=== Trowbridge North West ===
Trowbridge North West
Party	Candidate	Votes	%	±%
Conservative	Philip Kevin Seager	320	43.5	
Independent	John Knight	287	39.0	
Liberal Democrats	Chris Beaver	129	17.6	
Majority		33	4.5	
Turnout			32.6	
Conservative win (new seat)				

=== Trowbridge South West ===
Trowbridge South West (2 seats)
Party	Candidate	Votes	%	±%
Liberal Democrats	Jeff Osborn	989		
Liberal Democrats	Helen Bridget Osborn	948		
Conservative	Adam John Berrisford	384		
Conservative	Gerald Clive Burnan	383		
Majority		564		
Turnout			32.0	
Liberal Democrats win (new seat)				
Liberal Democrats win (new seat)				

=== Warminster East ===
Warminster East (3 seats)
Party	Candidate	Votes	%	±%
Conservative	Andrew Davis	1,510		
Conservative	Chris March	1,426		
Conservative	Bill Parks	1,346		
Liberal Democrats	May Joan Law	521		
Liberal Democrats	Simon Rowland Fisher	431		
Liberal Democrats	Neil Alan Pocock	423		
Majority		825		
Turnout			34.2	
Conservative hold		Swing		
Conservative hold		Swing		
Conservative hold		Swing		

=== Warminster West ===
Warminster West (3 seats)
Party	Candidate	Votes	%	±%
Conservative	Pip Ridout	1,027		
Conservative	Keith Maurice Humphries	957		
Conservative	Veronica Dorothy Anne Burden	930		
Liberal Democrats	Paul Batchelor	867		
Liberal Democrats	David John Lovell	691		
Liberal Democrats	Roger John Coveney	603		
Independent	Michael John Turner	535		
Majority		63		
Turnout			33.2	
Conservative hold		Swing		
Conservative gain from Independent		Swing		
Conservative gain from Liberal Democrats		Swing		

=== Westbury Ham ===
Westbury Ham (3 seats)
Party	Candidate	Votes	%	±%
Liberal Democrats	Gordon Ian King	749		
Liberal Democrats	David Jenkins	738		
Independent	Russell Mark Jonathan Hawker	723		
Conservative	Michael Barry Hawkins	640		
Conservative	Ian Taylor	573		
Conservative	Bill Braid	501		
Liberal Democrats	Malcolm Jonathon Rosier	393		
Labour	Peter John Ezra	234		
Majority		83		
Turnout			29.6	
Liberal Democrats gain from Conservative		Swing		
Liberal Democrats gain from Labour		Swing		
Independent win (new seat)				

=== Westbury Laverton ===
Westbury Laverton (2 seats)
Party	Candidate	Votes	%	±%
Conservative	Georgie Denison-Pender	703		
Conservative	Sue Ezra	676		
Labour	Christine Linda Mitchell	215		
Labour	Dot Large	211		
Majority		461		
Turnout			25.1	
Conservative hold		Swing		
Conservative hold		Swing		

== See also ==
- West Wiltshire local elections
