= List of settlements in Wiltshire by population =

The 19 largest settlements of the county of Wiltshire, with its only city in bold, and administrative centres in yellow.

This is a list of settlements in Wiltshire by population based on the results of the 2011 census. In 2011, there were 19 built-up area subdivisions with 5,000 or more inhabitants in Wiltshire. These are shown in the table below along with some less populous settlements.

== Population ranking ==
#	Settlement	Administrative Area	Population		Designation
#	Settlement	Administrative Area	2001	2011	Designation
1	Swindon	Swindon	155,700	182,441	Town
2	Salisbury	Wiltshire	43,400	44,748	City
3	Trowbridge	Wiltshire	33,100	39,409	Town
4	Chippenham	Wiltshire	33,190	35,800	Town
5	Melksham	Wiltshire	18,210	19,357	Town
6	Devizes	Wiltshire	14,380	18,064	Town
7	Warminster	Wiltshire	17,377	17,490	Town
8	Calne	Wiltshire	13,790	17,274	Town
9	Westbury	Wiltshire	13,360	16,989	Town
10	Corsham	Wiltshire	11,320	13,432	Town
11	Wootton Bassett	Wiltshire	10,936	11,265	Town
12	Amesbury	Wiltshire	8,310	10,116	Town
13	Tidworth	Wiltshire	6,540	9,174	Town (garrison town)
14	Bradford on Avon	Wiltshire	9,072	9,149	Town
15	Bulford Camp	Wiltshire	9,310	8,556	Military camp
16	Marlborough	Wiltshire	7,710	8,092	Town
17	Highworth	Swindon	7,996	7,886	Town
18	Wroughton	Swindon	6,279	6,474	Village
19	Malmesbury	Wiltshire	5,280	6,318	Town
20	Hilperton	Wiltshire	4,284	4,967	Village
21	Lyneham	Wiltshire	5,319	4,945	Village
22	Ludgershall	Wiltshire	3,775	4,427	Town
23	Purton	Wiltshire	3,934	4,228	Village
24	Cricklade	Wiltshire	4,132	4,227	Town
25	Bulford	Wiltshire	4,698	4,201	Village
26	Pewsey	Wiltshire	3,237	3,634	Village
27	Wilton	Wiltshire	3,873	3,579	Town
28	Box	Wiltshire	3,439	3,525	Village
29	Redlynch	Wiltshire	3,475	3,448	Village
30	Downton	Wiltshire	2,869	3,073	Village
31	Colerne	Wiltshire	2,807	2,972	Village

== Gallery of some of the settlements ==
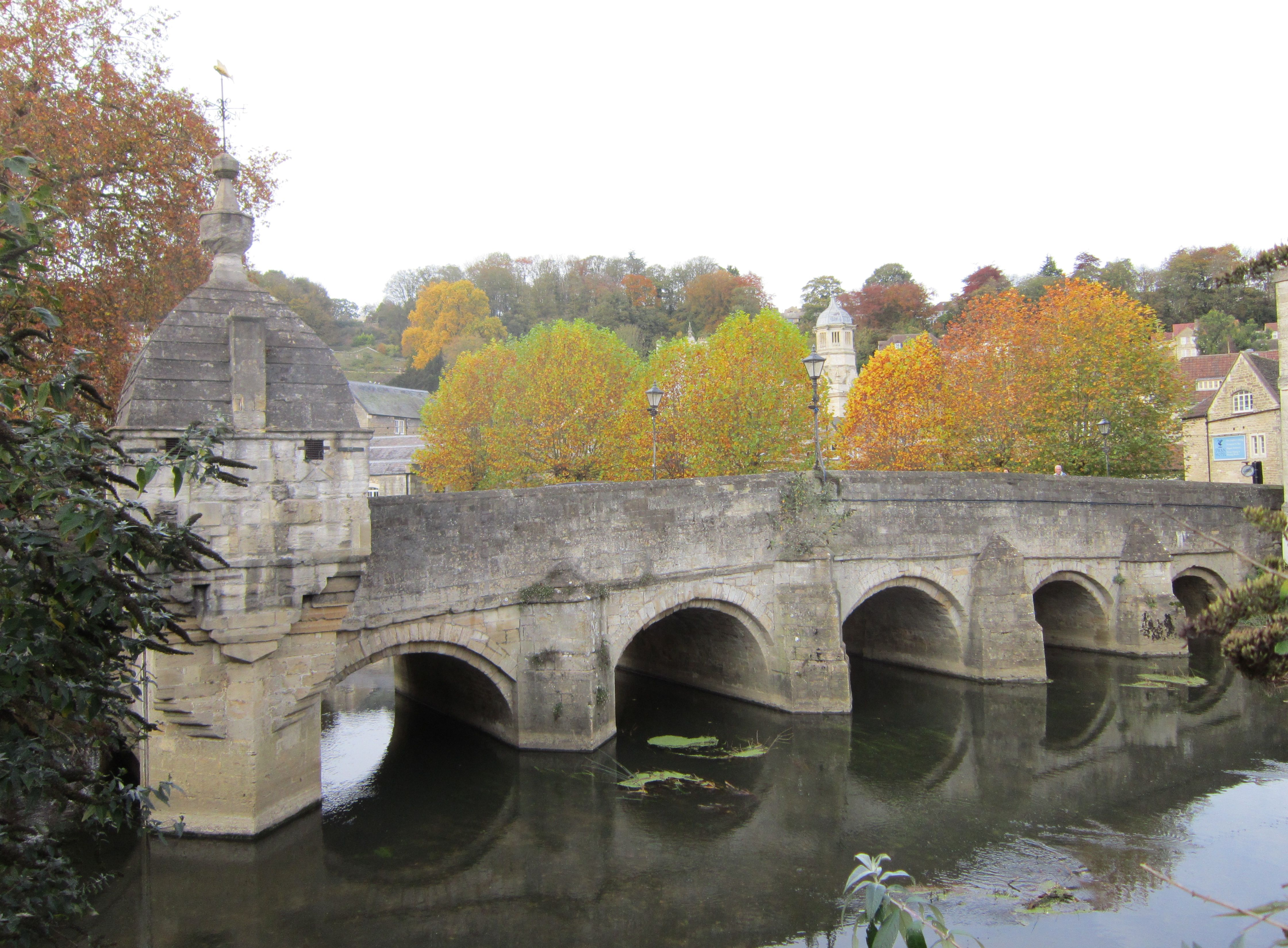
Bradford on Avon Town Bridge

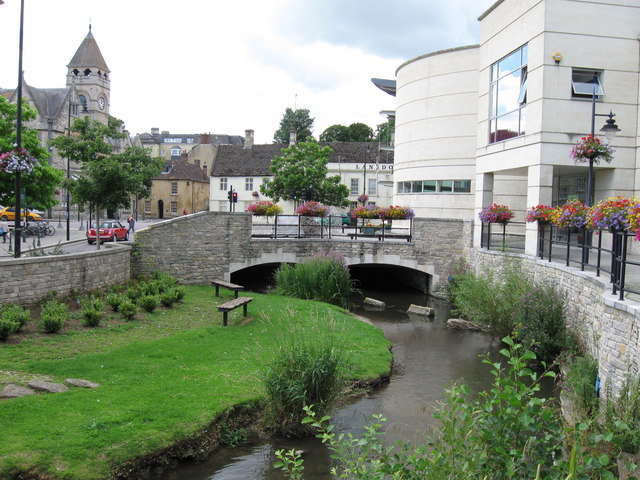
Calne River Marden

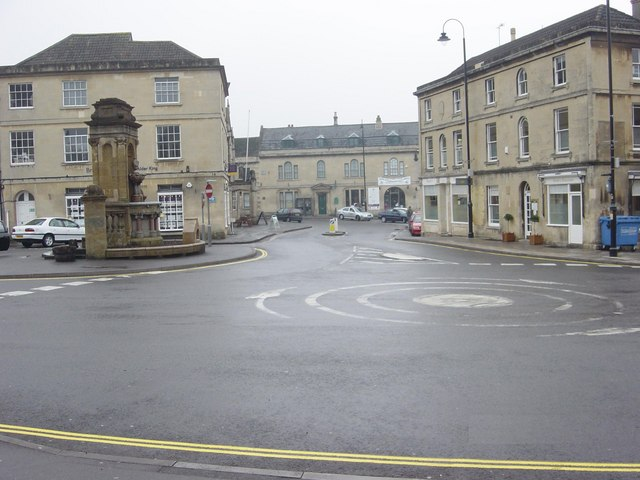
Chippenham Cenotaph

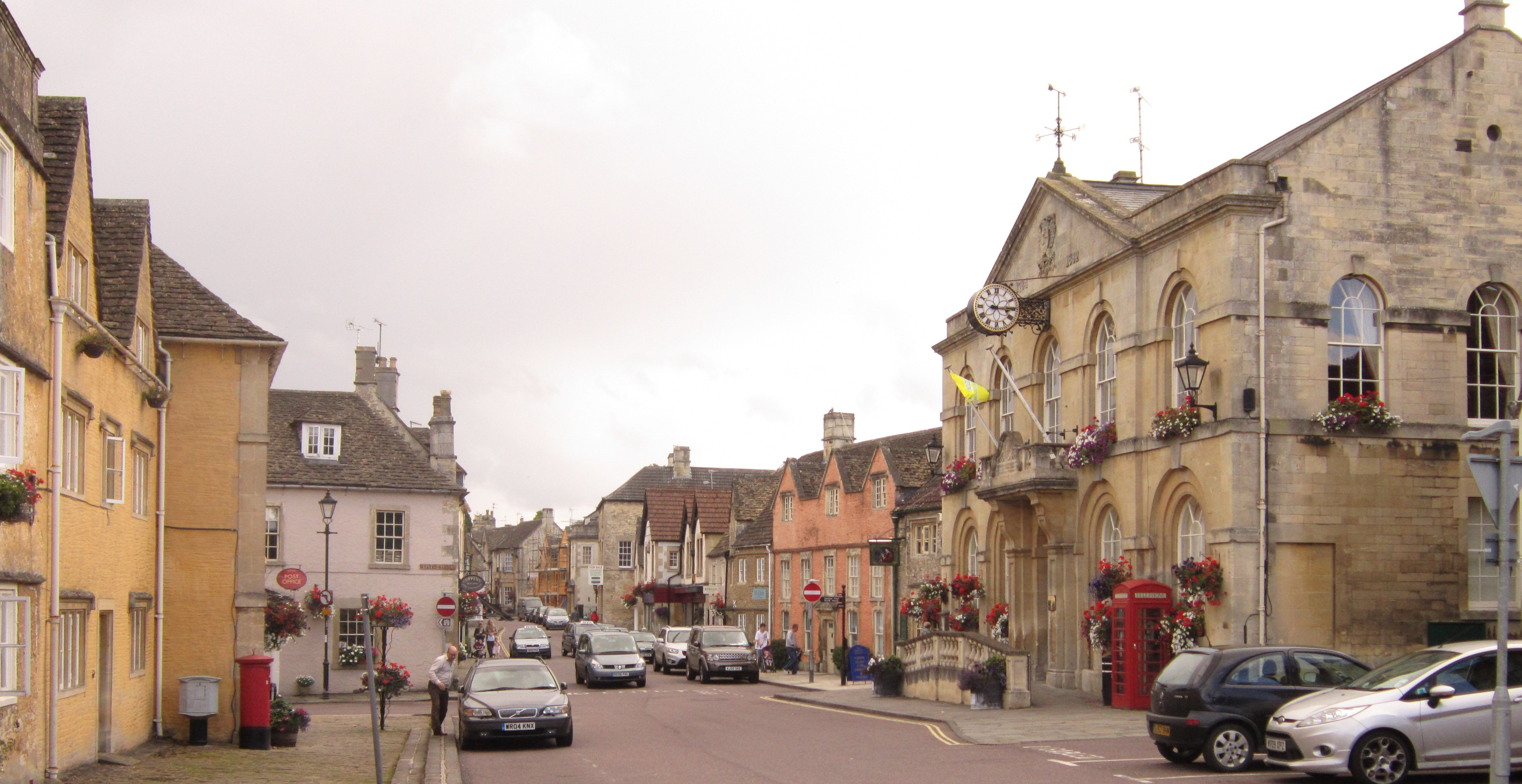
Corsham High Street

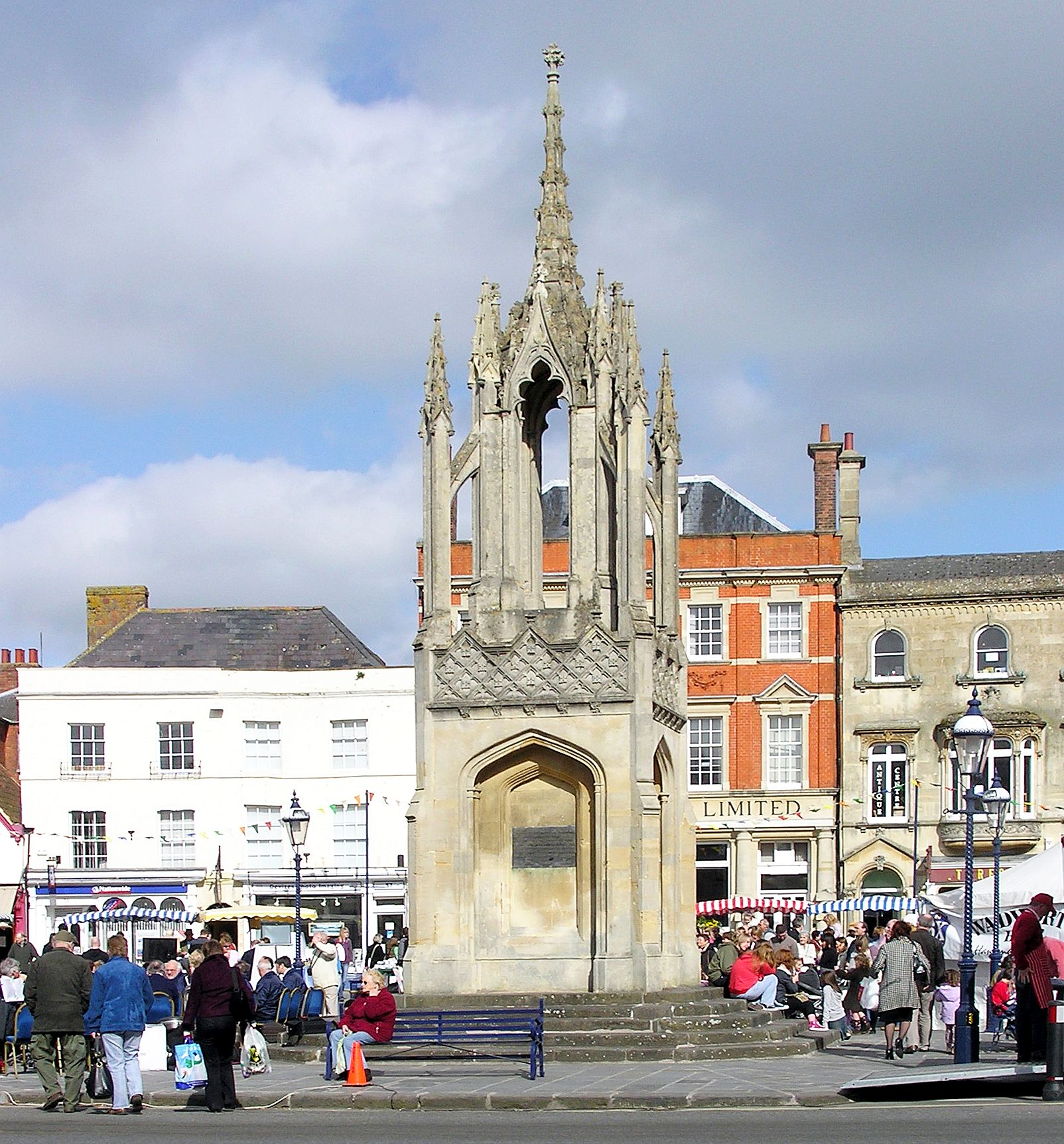
Devizes Market Cross

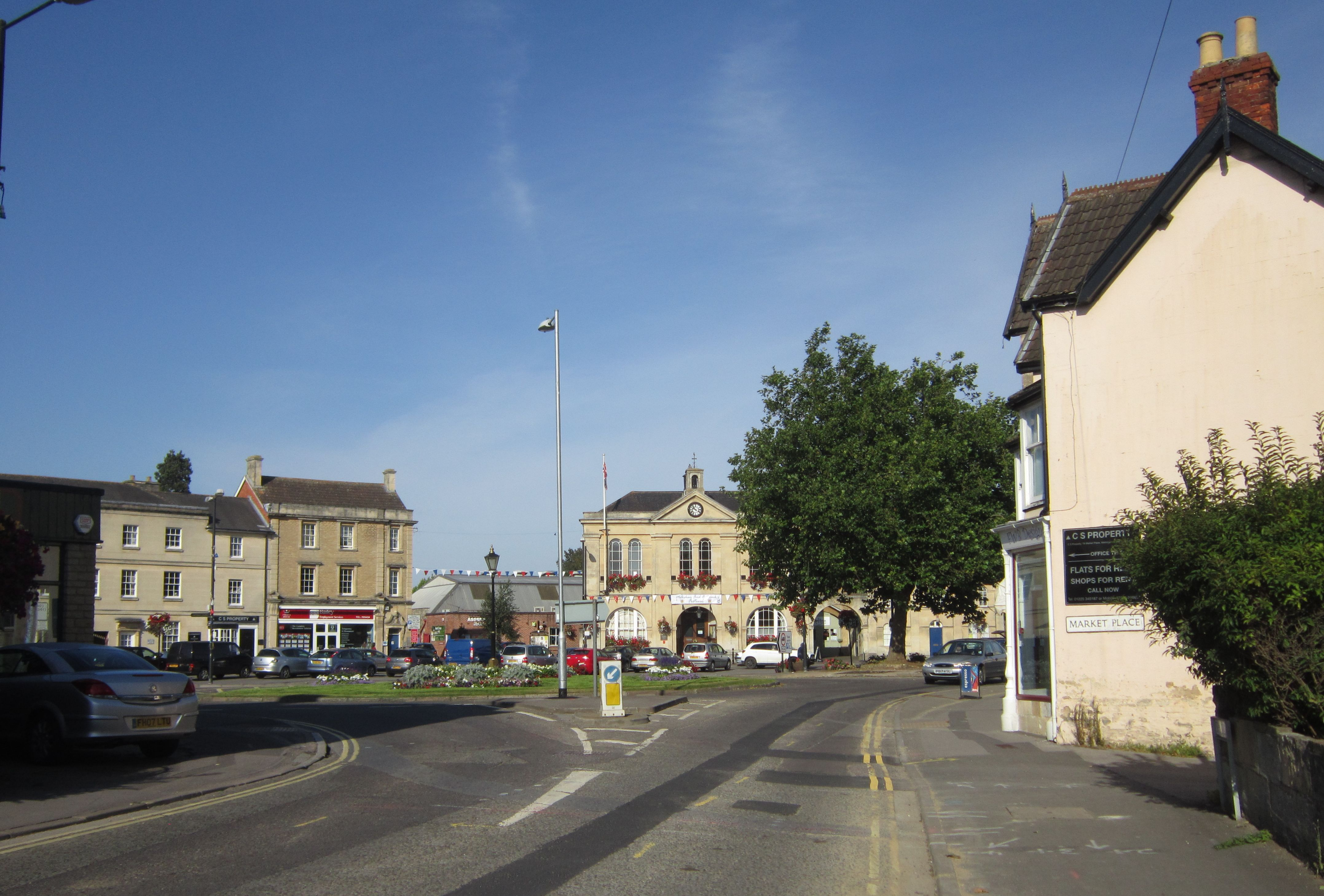
Melksham Market Place

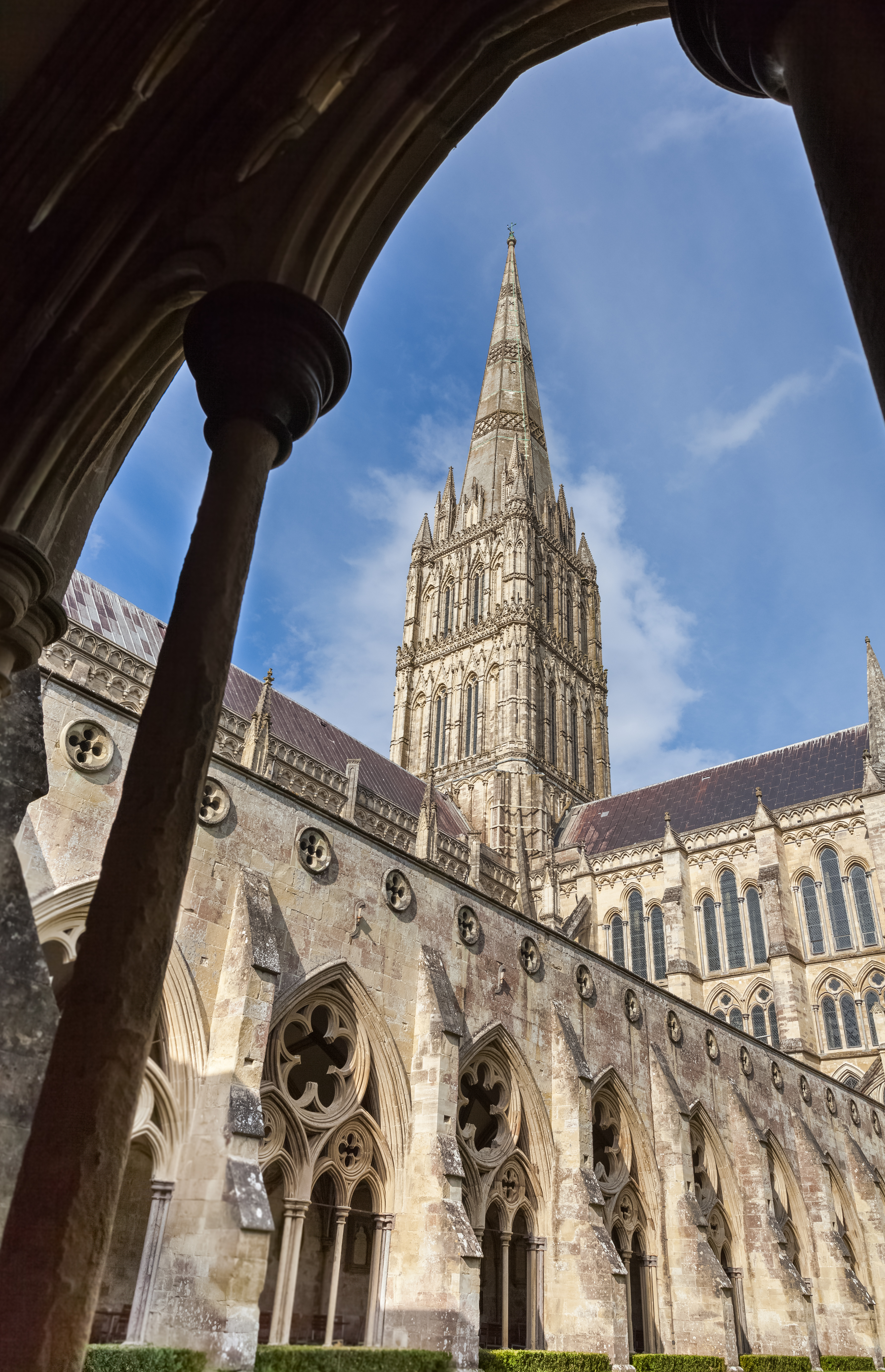
Salisbury Cathedral

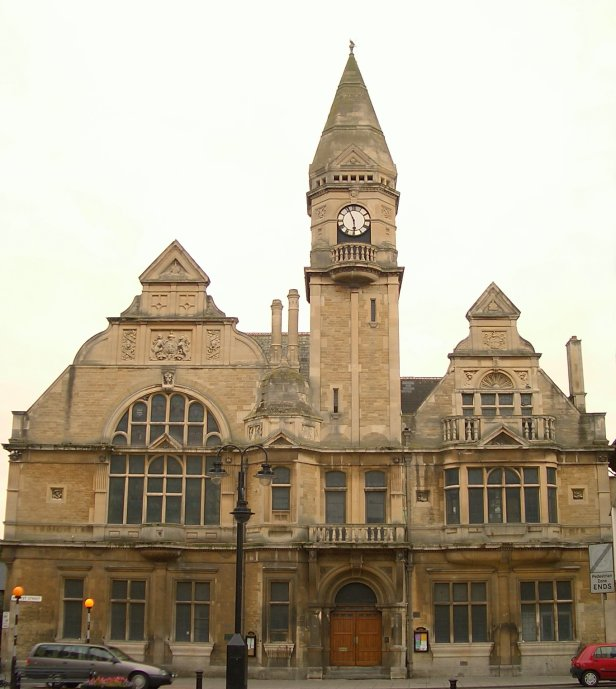
Trowbridge Town Hall

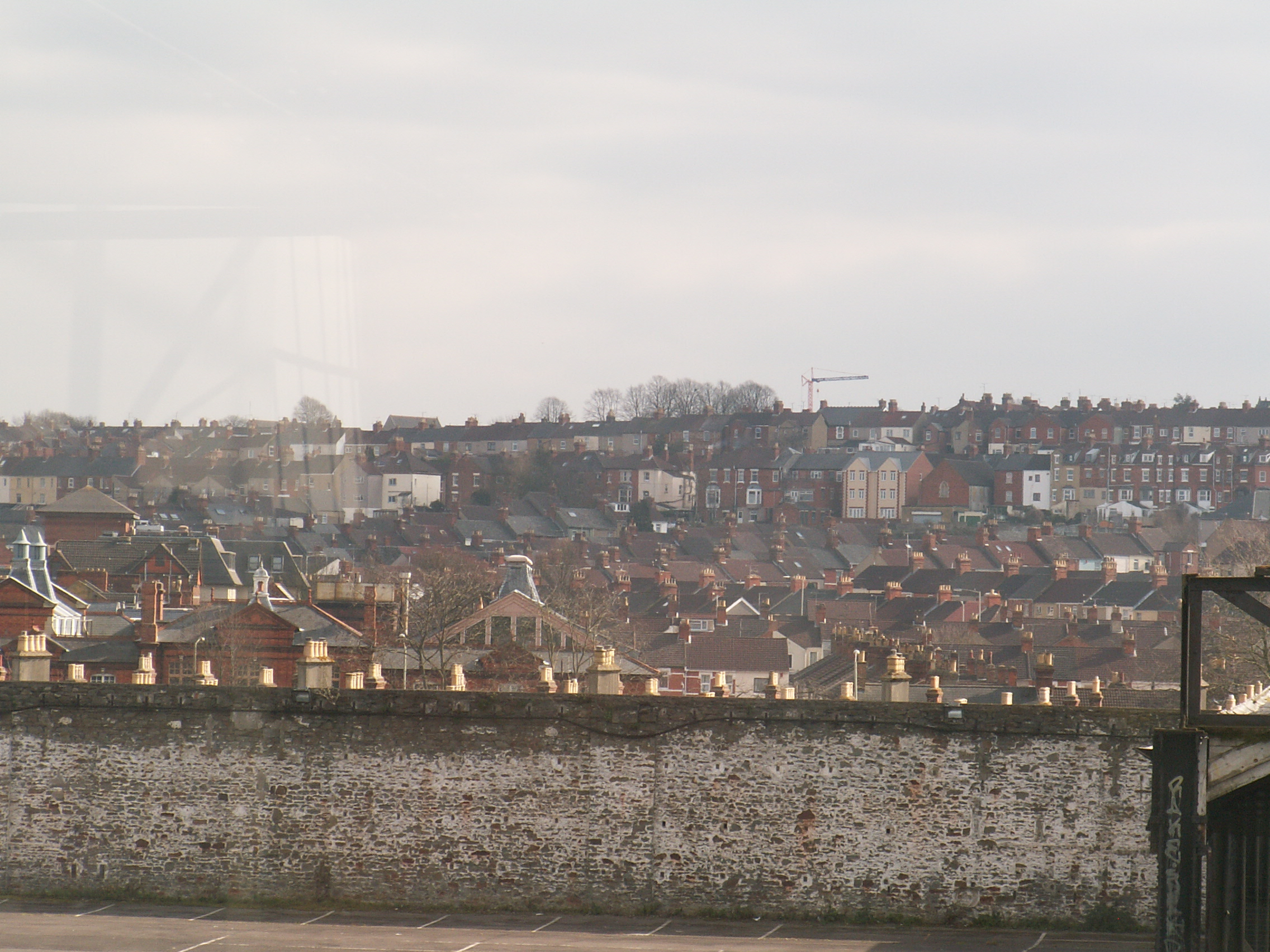
Swindon

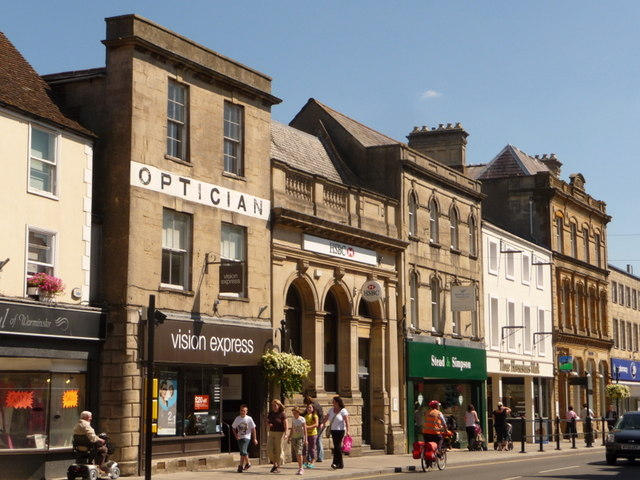
Warminster Town Centre

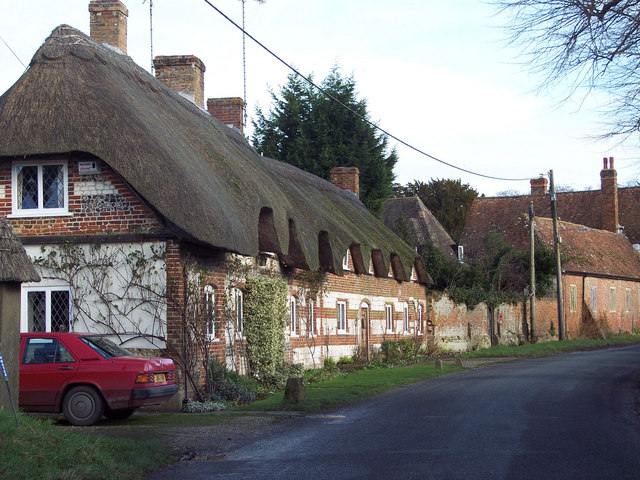
West Amesbury Thatched Cottages

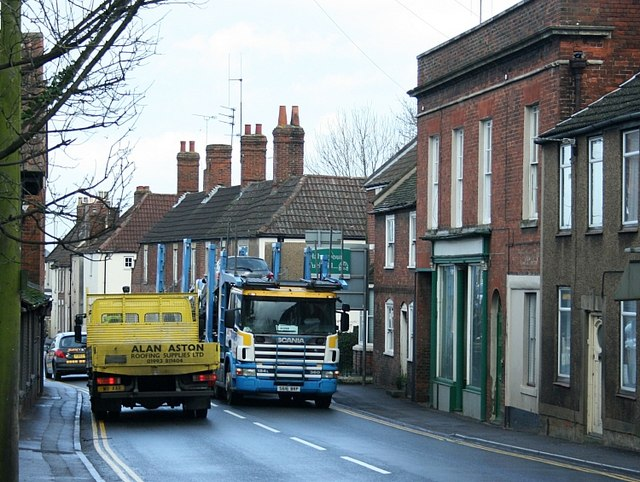
Westbury

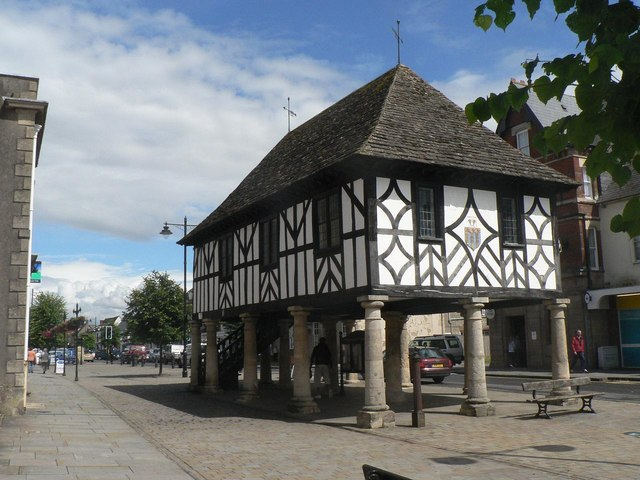
Wootton Bassett Town Hall

== See also ==
- Wiltshire
- List of places in Wiltshire
- List of civil parishes in Wiltshire
