= Marlborough Rural District =

Rural District in Wiltshire, England

Coordinates: 51°26′N 01°46′W

Marlborough
- History
  - Created: 1894
  - Abolished: 1934
  - Succeeded by: Marlborough and Ramsbury
- Status: Rural district

Marlborough Rural District was a rural district in the county of Wiltshire, England. It surrounded the town and municipal borough of Marlborough. In 1934 it merged with the Ramsbury Rural District to form Marlborough and Ramsbury Rural District.

== Civil parishes ==
At the time of its dissolution it consisted of the following civil parishes to the west of Marlborough.

- Avebury
- Berwick Bassett
- Broad Hinton
- East Kennett
- Fyfield
- Mildenhall
- North Savernake (abolished to create Savernake CP in 1934)
- Ogbourne St Andrew
- Ogbourne St George
- Overton Heath (extra-parochial area merged with Fyfield in 1896)
- Preshute
- South Savernake with Brimslade and Cadley (abolished to create Savernake CP in 1934)
- Savernake (created 1934)
- West Overton
- Winterbourne Bassett
- Winterbourne Monkton
