= 2003 West Wiltshire District Council election =

2003 UK local government election

- 1 May 2003

All 44 seats to West Wiltshire District Council 23 seats needed for a majority
	First party	Second party
	Con	LD
Party	Conservative	Liberal Democrats
Last election	10 seats, 35.6%	27 seats, 47.9%
Seats won	19	19
Seat change	▲9	▼8
Popular vote	20,996	19,185
Percentage	41.5%	37.9%
Swing	▲5.9%	▼10.0%
	Third party	Fourth party
	Ind	Lab
Party	Independent	Labour
Last election	4 seats, 6.3%	2 seats, 5.2%
Seats won	4	2
Seat change	Steady	Steady
Popular vote	4,565	2,856
Percentage	9.0%	5.6%
Swing	▲2.3%	▲0.4%
- Results of the 2003 West Wiltshire District Council election
Council control before election
Liberal Democrats
Council control after election
No overall control

Elections to West Wiltshire District Council were held on 1 May 2003. The whole council was up for election and the Liberal Democrats lost their majority, leaving the council with no overall control.

Many wards had boundary changes, and some were new. None were uncontested.

== Results ==
West Wiltshire local election result 2003
Party	Seats	Gains	Losses	Net gain/loss	Seats %	Votes %	Votes	+/−
Conservative	19				43.2	41.5	20,966	
Liberal Democrats	19				43.2	37.9	19,185	
Independent	4				9.1	9.0	4,565	
Labour	2				4.5	5.6	2,856	
Green	0				0	5.9	3,006	

== Ward results ==
=== Atworth and Whitley ===
Atworth and Whitley
Party	Candidate	Votes	%	±%
Liberal Democrats	Terrence Peter Chivers	566		
Conservative	Robert George Ian Elliott	209		
Labour	Gregory Anthony Coombes	117	9.5	
Majority		357		
Turnout		892	45.7	
Liberal Democrats win (new seat)				

=== Bradford-on-Avon North ===
Bradford-on-Avon North (2 seats)
Party	Candidate	Votes	%	±%
Liberal Democrats	Janet Lindsay Repton	639		
Liberal Democrats	Sophie Farkas	632		
Conservative	Bryan Joseph Earp	548		
Conservative	Anthony Ivan Moore	445		
Green	Susan Karen Nowell-Kelley	242		
Labour	James Henry Joseph Tracey	226		
Majority		84		
Turnout			40.2	
Liberal Democrats hold		Swing		
Liberal Democrats hold		Swing		

=== Bradford-on-Avon South ===
Bradford-on-Avon South (2 seats)
Party	Candidate	Votes	%	±%
Liberal Democrats	Frances Lewis	665		
Liberal Democrats	Rosanna Rosemary Brown	661		
Conservative	David John Bolwell	587		
Conservative	Gwendoline Mary Allison	573		
Green	Helen Jane Rich	177		
Labour	Angela Womersley	155		
Green	Stephen Trevor Harding	150		
Majority		74		
Turnout			39.6	
Liberal Democrats hold		Swing		
Liberal Democrats hold		Swing		

=== Dilton Marsh ===
Dilton Marsh (2 seats)
Party	Candidate	Votes	%	±%
Conservative	Julian Thurstan Syndercombe Bower	695		
Conservative	Linda Mary Conley	658		
Liberal Democrats	Alison Mary Irving	586		
Liberal Democrats	John Andrew Moody	428		
Independent	Francis Morland	392		
Green	David John Howells	155		
Green	Kevan James Corcoran	152		
Majority		72		
Turnout			39.6	
Conservative gain from Liberal Democrats		Swing		
Conservative win (new seat)				

=== Ethandune ===
Ethandune
Party	Candidate	Votes	%	±%
Conservative	Julie Swabey	493		
Liberal Democrats	Richard George Crofts	206		
Green	Diana Kathleen Corcoran	106		
Majority		287		
Turnout			39.4	
Conservative gain from Independent		Swing		

=== Holt ===
Holt
Party	Candidate	Votes	%	±%
Liberal Democrats	Duncan John Hames	485		
Conservative	Philip Kevin Seager	285		
Green	Sonja Nicolson	33		
Majority		200		
Turnout			41.4	
Liberal Democrats hold		Swing		

=== Manor Vale ===
Manor Vale (2 seats)
Party	Candidate	Votes	%	±%
Conservative	William Campbell Viles	817		
Liberal Democrats	Judith Cunliffe-Jones	751		
Liberal Democrats	Godfrey Randall Hall	455		
Green	Simon George Allen	300		
Majority		296		
Turnout			40.8	
Conservative hold		Swing		
Liberal Democrats hold		Swing		

=== Melksham North ===
Melksham North (2 seats)
Party	Candidate	Votes	%	±%
Liberal Democrats	Angela Betty Barker	599		
Liberal Democrats	Jacqueline Wells	439		
Labour	Davina Margaret Griffin	330		
Labour	Geoffrey Alan Mitcham	283		
Green	Hilary Jane Millichamp	122		
Majority		109		
Turnout			24.3	
Liberal Democrats win (new seat)				
Liberal Democrats win (new seat)				

=== Melksham Spa ===
Melksham Spa (2 seats)
Party	Candidate	Votes	%	±%
Conservative	Brian Stanley Mudge	571		
Labour	William Charles Gordon Cox	361		
Liberal Democrats	Malcolm Paton	351		
Liberal Democrats	Helen Bridget Osborn	254		
Green	Lex Hepenstall	146		
Majority		10		
Turnout			25.9	
Conservative win (new seat)				
Labour win (new seat)				

=== Melksham Without ===
Melksham Without (2 seats)
Party	Candidate	Votes	%	±%
Conservative	Richard George Wiltshire	484		
Conservative	Roy Sidney While	482		
Liberal Democrats	Simon Rowland Fisher	211		
Liberal Democrats	John Vladimir Landell-Mills	172		
Independent	Stephen Bryan Petty	345		
Majority		271		
Turnout			26.9	
Conservative win (new seat)				
Conservative win (new seat)				

=== Melksham Woodrow ===
Melksham Woodrow
Party	Candidate	Votes	%	±%
Liberal Democrats	Malcolm Jonathon Rosier	295		
Labour	Margaret Ethel White	163		
Majority		132		
Turnout		458	24.0	
Liberal Democrats hold		Swing		

=== Mid Wylye Valley ===
Mid Wylye Valley
Party	Candidate	Votes	%	±%
Independent	Christopher Newbury	715		
Conservative	William Daniel Hurd	200		
Liberal Democrats	Victoria Christine Scott Landell-Mills	33		
Green	Karen Ann Cunningham	22		
Majority		515		
Turnout		970	49.0	
Independent hold		Swing		

=== Paxcroft ===
Paxcroft (2 seats)
Party	Candidate	Votes	%	±%
Liberal Democrats	Trevor William Carbin	913		
Independent	Ernest Frederick (Ernie) Clark	735		
Liberal Democrats	Brian Cullern	642		
Conservative	Marina Vassiliev	427		
Conservative	Derek Frederick Thomas Stimpson	346		
Majority		93		
Turnout			38.9	
Liberal Democrats hold		Swing		
Independent win (new seat)				

=== Shearwater ===
Shearwater
Party	Candidate	Votes	%	±%
Conservative	Michael Mounde	548		
Liberal Democrats	Piers Gibbon	154		
Green	Stephen Sainsbury	79		
Majority		394		
Turnout			39.4	
Conservative hold		Swing		

=== Southwick and Wingfield ===
Southwick and Wingfield
Party	Candidate	Votes	%	±%
Independent	Anthony Guy Phillips	460		
Liberal Democrats	Shirley Margaret Brooks	99		
Green	Hilary Carberry	60		
Majority		361		
Turnout		619	37.0	
Independent win (new seat)				

=== Summerham ===
Summerham
Party	Candidate	Votes	%	±%
Conservative	Virginia Fortescue	572		
Liberal Democrats	Douglas Malcolm Firmager	329		
Majority		243		
Turnout			50.4	
Conservative gain from Liberal Democrats		Swing		

=== Trowbridge Adcroft ===
Trowbridge Adcroft (2)
Party	Candidate	Votes	%	±%
Liberal Democrats	Nicholas Blakemore	490		
Liberal Democrats	Thomas Raymond James	476		
Conservative	Molly Hopkins	325		
Conservative	Jennifer Jane Murrison	301		
Labour	Peter John Ezra	139		
Green	Richard Douglas Mills	122		
Majority		151		
Turnout			26.1	
Liberal Democrats hold		Swing		
Liberal Democrats hold		Swing		

=== Trowbridge College ===
Trowbridge College (2 seats)
Party	Candidate	Votes	%	±%
Liberal Democrats	Jeff Osborn	553		
Liberal Democrats	Stephen John Squires	426		
Conservative	Suzanne Yvonne Gordon	395		
Conservative	Anthony Kennerdale	361		
Green	Nigel John Pratt	126		
Independent	Geoffrey Kenneth Whiffen	88		
Majority		31		
Turnout			26.4	
Liberal Democrats hold		Swing		
Liberal Democrats hold		Swing		

=== Trowbridge Drynham ===
Trowbridge Drynham (2 seats)
Party	Candidate	Votes	%	±%
Conservative	Graham David Payne	601		
Conservative	Gerald Clive Burnan	488		
Liberal Democrats	Grace Hill	448		
Liberal Democrats	Marcus Alexander Francis, Jr.	434		
Green	Patrick Drinkwater	153		
Majority		40		
Turnout			25.9	
Conservative hold		Swing		
Conservative gain from Liberal Democrats		Swing		

=== Trowbridge John of Gaunt ===
Trowbridge John of Gaunt (2 seats)
Party	Candidate	Votes	%	±%
Conservative	John Roland Wallace Knight	454		
Liberal Democrats	Robert John Brice	453		
Conservative	Graeme Stuart Hawley	446		
Liberal Democrats	Joan Mary Stacey	420		
Green	Amanda Griffiths	119		
Majority		7		
Turnout			25.1	
Conservative gain from Liberal Democrats		Swing		
Liberal Democrats hold		Swing		

=== Trowbridge Park ===
Trowbridge Park (2 seats)
Party	Candidate	Votes	%	±%
Liberal Democrats	Andrew James Bryant	742		
Liberal Democrats	Stephen John Oldrieve	707		
Conservative	Peter Fuller	670		
Conservative	Derek Coop	612		
Independent	Stephen Nash	299		
Green	Laura Michelle Pictor	156		
Majority		37		
Turnout			32.9	
Liberal Democrats hold		Swing		
Liberal Democrats gain from Conservative		Swing		

=== Warminster East ===
Warminster East (3 seats)
Party	Candidate	Votes	%	±%
Conservative	Andrew Davis	1,311		
Conservative	Christopher March	1,235		
Conservative	Kay Carol Whatley-Gibbs	1,019		
Liberal Democrats	Giacinto Giovanni (John) Barberio	479		
Liberal Democrats	Graham Thomas Hedley	377		
Green	Roland Peter Noyce	282		
Independent	Stephen James Upton	246		
Majority		540		
Turnout			29.6	
Conservative hold		Swing		
Conservative hold		Swing		
Conservative hold		Swing		

=== Warminster West ===
Warminster West (3 seats)
Party	Candidate	Votes	%	±%
Independent	John Edward Syme	791		
Conservative	Martin John Baker	665		
Liberal Democrats	Paul Batchelor	605		
Conservative	Alvin Robert Smith	572		
Conservative	William John Parks	568		
Liberal Democrats	David John Lovell	517		
Independent	Leslie George Rose	494		
Liberal Democrats	Mark Houghton Brown	387		
Green	Ashley John Cunningham	163		
Majority		33		
Turnout			28.6	
Independent gain from Liberal Democrats		Swing		
Conservative gain from Liberal Democrats		Swing		
Liberal Democrats hold		Swing		

=== Westbury Ham ===
Westbury Ham (2 seats)
Party	Candidate	Votes	%	±%
Conservative	John Frederick Clegg	512		
Labour	Elisha Manasseh	510		
Conservative	Charles Thomas Finbow	483		
Labour	Christine Linda Mitchell	365		
Liberal Democrats	William David Charles Tout	331		
Green	Kathryn Jennifer Toyne	141		
Majority		27		
Turnout			24.9	
Conservative win (new seat)				
Labour win (new seat)				

=== Westbury Laverton ===
Westbury Laverton (2 seats)
Party	Candidate	Votes	%	±%
Conservative	Marion Clegg	512		
Conservative	Russell Mark Jonathan Hawker	496		
Liberal Democrats	Horace John Prickett	493		
Liberal Democrats	Gordon Ian King	482		
Labour	Stephen John Davies	108		
Labour	Michael Sutton	99		
Majority		3		
Turnout			30.3	
Conservative win (new seat)				
Conservative win (new seat)				
