= Ramsbury Rural District =

Former local government area in the UK

Coordinates: 51.443°N 1.605°W

Ramsbury was a rural district in Wiltshire, England from 1894 to 1934 around the village of Ramsbury.

It was formed under the Local Government Act 1894 from that part of the Hungerford rural sanitary district that was in Wiltshire. It was abolished in 1934 under a County Review Order and merged into the Marlborough and Ramsbury Rural District.
