= Ramsbury =

Village in Wiltshire, England

Coordinates: 51.442°N 1.606°W

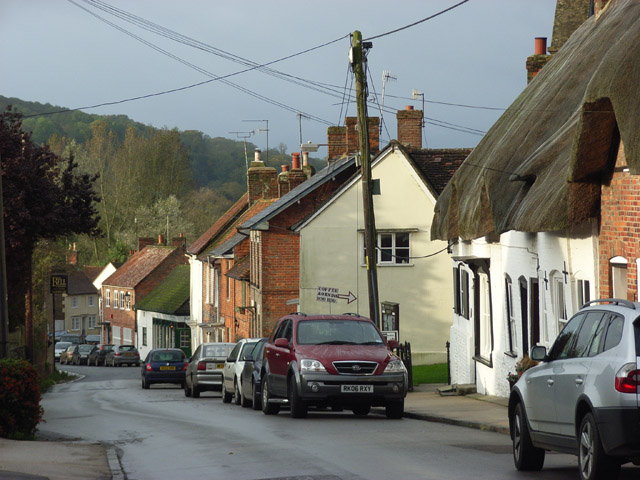
- Oxford Street, Ramsbury

- Location within Wiltshire
- Population: 1,989 (in 2011)
- OS grid reference: SU2771
- Civil parish: Ramsbury
- Unitary authority: Wiltshire
- Ceremonial county: Wiltshire
- Region: South West
- Country: England
- Sovereign state: United Kingdom
- Post town: Marlborough
- Postcode district: SN8
- Dialling code: 01672
- Police: Wiltshire
- Fire: Dorset and Wiltshire
- Ambulance: South Western
- UK Parliament: East Wiltshire
- Website: Parish Council

Ramsbury is a village and civil parish in the English county of Wiltshire. The village is in the Kennet Valley near the Berkshire boundary. The nearest towns are Hungerford about 4.5 miles (7.2 km) east and Marlborough about 5.5 miles (8.9 km) west. The much larger town of Swindon is about 12 miles (19 km) to the north.

Until at least the late 19th century, Ramsbury was considered to be a town, and from 1894 to 1974 its name was used for the much larger Ramsbury Rural District and Marlborough and Ramsbury Rural District.

The civil parish includes the hamlet of Axford about 2.5 miles (4.0 km) west of Ramsbury, and three smaller hamlets: New Town, close to Ramsbury to the southeast, and Knighton and Whittonditch, both about 1 mile (1.6 km) to the east. The 2011 Census recorded a parish population of 1,989.

== History ==
The Domesday Book of 1086 recorded a large settlement of 156 households at Ramesberie.

Littlecote Roman Villa is in the parish. The earliest written history of Ramsbury can be traced from the Saxon era, when the bishopric of Ramsbury was created in 909 AD.

Throughout the Middle Ages, Ramsbury traditionally held two annual fairs – a livestock fair in the spring, and a hiring fair or Mop fair at Michaelmas. Nearby Marlborough's tradition of holding one Mop each side of Michaelmas ("Little Mop" on the Saturday before and "Big Mop" on the Saturday after) was originally a means to accommodate the (then) more prestigious Ramsbury Mop. By the 19th century, both fairs had become cattle fairs. The spring cattle fair (traditionally held on 14 May) ceased in 1939. The Michaelmas fair slowly lost its original agricultural connections, becoming purely a funfair in 1946 before ceasing in the 1950s.

Between 1942 and 1946, during the Second World War, there was a Royal Air Force airfield known as RAF Ramsbury on a ridge of high ground to the south of the village.

An annual carnival was instituted to replace the fairs and survived until the 1990s, but has in turn been replaced with a biennial street fair which sees the High Street closed from the Square to the Memorial Hall.

=== Ramsbury Building Society ===
The Provident Union Investment Society was founded in Ramsbury in 1846, becoming the Ramsbury Building Society in 1928. It had its headquarters in the Square until 1982 and took as its logo the ancient wych-elm which grew immediately opposite. Subsequent mergers saw the building society subsumed into the Regency and West of England Building Society, then the Portman Building Society, and finally the Nationwide Building Society.

== Religion ==
=== Medieval episcopal see ===
In Saxon times, Ramsbury was an important location for the Church, and several of its early bishops went on to become Archbishops of Canterbury. The episcopal see of Ramsbury was created in AD 909 when Wiltshire and Berkshire were taken from the bishopric of Winchester to form the new diocese of Ramsbury. It was occasionally referred to as the bishopric of Ramsbury and Sonning. In 1058 it was joined with the bishopric of Sherborne to form the diocese of Sarum (Salisbury), and the see was translated to Old Sarum in 1075.

Although no longer a diocesan see, the bishopric of Ramsbury is now an episcopal title used by a suffragan bishop of the Church of England Diocese of Salisbury (see Bishop of Ramsbury), and is included in the Catholic Church's list of titular sees.

=== Parish church ===
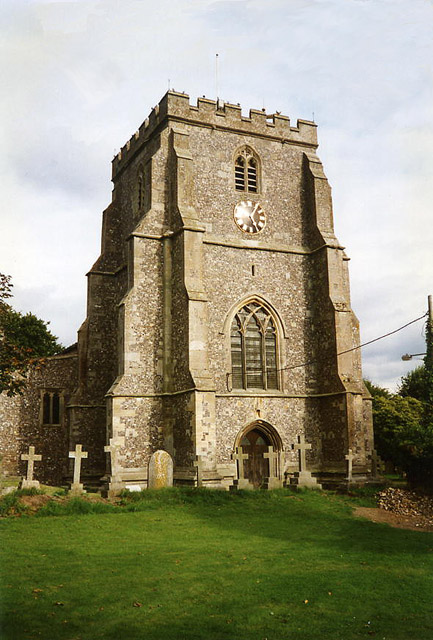
Church of the Holy Cross

The Church of England parish church of the Holy Cross was begun in the 13th century, possibly on the site of the former 11th century cathedral of the Diocese of Ramsbury, and enlarged later that century or in the early 14th. In the 15th century the chancel was lengthened and re-roofed. In 1891–2 the aisles were rebuilt and the south porch rebuilt.

The building is of flint with limestone dressings, and the chancel is finished in roughcast. The west tower is described as "massive" and has substantial corner buttresses.

The collection of stone fragments held in the church includes four which appear to be Norman. The font bowl is 12th century. The interior fittings, which include two brass chandeliers dated 1751, are described by Pevsner as "quite an uncommon wealth". The tower has six bells, five of them dated 1708 and made by the elder Abraham Rudhall. The church was recorded as Grade I listed in 1966.

In 1973 Ramsbury (with Axford) was united with the benefice of Aldbourne and Baydon to form the Whitton benefice and a team ministry was established. Chilton Foliat and Froxfield were added to Whitton in 1976.

=== Others ===
Until the 1790s, when it became an independent ecclesiastical parish, Baydon was a chapelry of Ramsbury parish. A chapel of ease dedicated to St Michael was built in 1856 at Axford and continues in use.

Presbyterians, Congregationalists, Primitive Methodists and Wesleyan Methodists met at Ramsbury and Axford. The last to close was the Methodist Church, in the late 2010s.

== Notable buildings ==
The parish has two Grade I listed buildings in addition to Holy Cross church. Ramsbury Manor was built in the 1680s by Robert Hooke for Sir William Jones, lawyer, Attorney General and member of Parliament. The house has two storeys and an attic, with nine bays at the front; to the south is a courtyard of servants' cottages. It stands in parkland to the west of the village, on the north bank of the Kennet, which has been dammed to form a lake. At the park's main entrance are Grade II* listed gates and lodges.

Also Grade I listed is Axford Farmhouse, built in the 17th century and altered in the 19th, with an attached 13th-century chapel.

There are three Grade II* listed houses: Riverside House, Axford (16th and 17th centuries, part timber-framed); Parliament Piece, Ramsbury (five bays, 17th century, extended 19th); and Crowood House, north of Ramsbury (also five bays, late 17th and early 19th).

== Education ==
From 1786 to the 1840s, Edward and Arthur Meyrick ran a school at Ramsbury Hill House on Back Lane and a girls' school was funded by Louisa Read of Crowood House (d.1879). In 1878, Mary Jane Lanfear left £600 to fund apprenticeships for local boys. The Lanfear Educational Trust still operates, making small educational grants to young people in Ramsbury and Axford.

In 1875, a board school was built on Back Lane, opposite Isles Road. It is now a private residence. Today, Ramsbury Pre-School and Primary School are in modern buildings on Isles Road, while secondary education is provided at St John's School, Marlborough.

== Governance ==
Ramsbury has an elected parish council and also falls within the area of the Wiltshire Council unitary authority, which is responsible for all of the most significant local government services.

The parish was part of Ramsbury Rural District from 1894 until 1934, Marlborough and Ramsbury Rural District until 1974, and Kennet District until the creation of the unitary authority in 2009.

== The Tree ==
For centuries, Ramsbury was known for its Tree – a large wych elm which stood in the Square at the heart of the village. The Tree was first mentioned in a report in 1751, by which time it must have already been well established. In its prime, its spread was said to have touched the buildings on all sides of the Square. Photographs from the early 20th century show the Tree in apparently fine health, although perhaps reduced from its former size. But, by the 1920s, the Tree was in noticeable decline. It gradually succumbed to old age, eventually dying in 1983 by which time it would have been well over 230 years old.

The gnarled stump remained in the Square for several years while a replacement was discussed. Many villagers wanted to keep the old tree, dead or not, where it had stood for so many centuries. However, after a referendum which threatened to split the village, it was eventually agreed that it should be replaced. Over the course of the second half of the 20th century, Dutch elm disease had ravaged the native populations of elm species and so an oak sapling (sponsored by Portman Building Society) was sourced from Epping Forest and planted to replace the old tree.

== Notable residents ==
Local people are known as Ramsbury Bulldogs, contrasting with the neighbouring village of Aldbourne, where the locals are known as Dabchicks.

The village's notable residents have included Sir Francis Burdett (1770–1844), a radical Whig politician, and his daughter Angela Burdett-Coutts. In 1837 Angela became the richest woman in England when she inherited her grandfather's fortune. Over several years she gave most of this money away to good causes: nearly three million pounds by the time she died in 1906. Both lived in Ramsbury Manor. Other owners of the manor include William Rootes (from 1958), industrialist and motor manufacturer; and Harry Hyams (from 1964 until his death in 2015), property developer.

Stefan Persson, the owner of H&M, has a main residence on the outskirts of Ramsbury. He also owns the Ramsbury microbrewery which brews Ramsbury Gold bottled beer, amongst others. Composer David Fanshawe lived near Ramsbury until his death in July 2010.

== Food and drink ==
There are two pubs situated in Ramsbury: The Bell on the Square and the Crown and Anchor on the corner of Crowood Lane and Oxford Street, as well as the Royal British Legion's branch on the High Street. In addition to the Ramsbury Brewery, Distillery and Smokehouse, several other notable local food and drink producers are based in Ramsbury. The Ramsbury Tea Company, in particular, has won several national awards.
