= Axford, Wiltshire =

Coordinates: 51.429°N 1.659°W

Axford
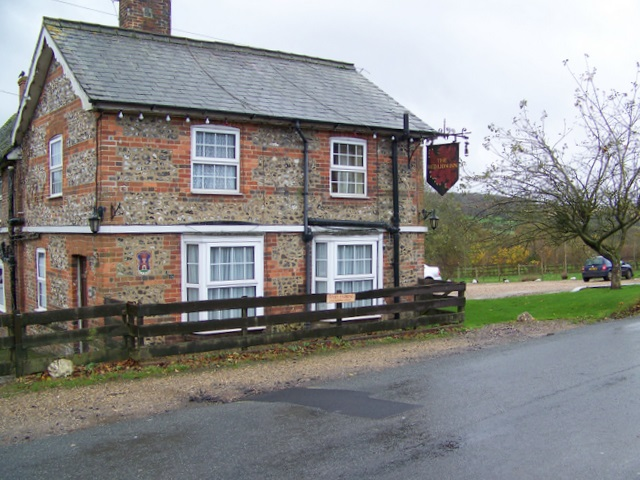
- The Red Lion Inn in 2009

- Location within Wiltshire
- OS grid reference: SU2370
- Civil parish: Ramsbury
- Unitary authority: Wiltshire
- Ceremonial county: Wiltshire
- Region: South West
- Country: England
- Sovereign state: United Kingdom
- Post town: Marlborough
- Postcode district: SN8
- Dialling code: 01672
- Police: Wiltshire
- Fire: Dorset and Wiltshire
- Ambulance: South Western
- UK Parliament: East Wiltshire
- Website: Ramsbury & Axford Community

Axford is a small village in Ramsbury parish in the English county of Wiltshire. It lies on the north bank of the River Kennet, about 3 miles (4.8 km) south-west of Ramsbury village and the same distance east of Marlborough.

== History ==
Axford was one of seven Saxon settlements along the Kennet Valley in modern-day Wiltshire in the 5th and 6th centuries.

During the 15th and 16th centuries, Axford manor was centred on Priory Farm a short distance from the village itself. The majority of housing was built to the south of the main road through the village; the area to the north was developed during the late 18th and early 19th century.

St Michael's church was built in 1856 to designs of William White, as a chapel of ease to Holy Cross at Ramsbury.

A military camp was sited near Axford during the Second World War.

== Notable buildings ==
Axford has a Grade I listed building, Axford Farmhouse, which has medieval origins. Riverside House, Grade II* listed, has a 16th-century wing, partly timber framed; the house was enlarged in the 17th century.

== Local government ==
Axford is in Ramsbury civil parish; the parish council styles itself as Ramsbury & Axford Parish Council. The second tier of local government is Wiltshire Council. The two councils are responsible for different aspects of local government.

== Amenities ==
Axford is close to the A4 road. Bus services are provided by the Swindon's Bus Company route 48 between Swindon and Marlborough.

The village pub, the Red Lion, closed in 2019.
