= Cricklade and Wootton Bassett Rural District =

Rural district in the county of Wiltshire, England

Coordinates: 51°34′N 01°56′W

Cricklade and Wootton Bassett
- History
  - Created: 1894
  - Abolished: 1974
  - Succeeded by: North Wiltshire
- Status: Rural district

Cricklade and Wootton Bassett Rural District was a rural district in the county of Wiltshire, England. It lay to the west and southwest of the town and municipal borough of Swindon.

Following the Local Government Act 1972, on 1 April 1974 the district was merged into the local government district of North Wiltshire.

== Civil parishes ==
At the time of its dissolution it consisted of the following civil parishes to the south and west of Swindon.

- Ashton Keynes
- Braydon
- Broad Town (created 1884 from parts of Clyffe Pypard and Broad Hinton, in Marlborough Rural District)
- Clyffe Pypard
- Cricklade (created 1899)
- Cricklade St Mary (abolished to create Cricklade CP in 1899)
- Cricklade St Sampson (abolished to create Cricklade CP in 1899)
- Eisey
- Latton
- Leigh
- Lydiard Millicent
- Lydiard Tregoze (now part of Swindon)
- Lyneham
- Marston Meysey
- Purton
- Tockenham
- Wootton Bassett
