= Heywood, Wiltshire =

Village in Wiltshire, England

Coordinates: 51.281°N 2.184°W

Heywood
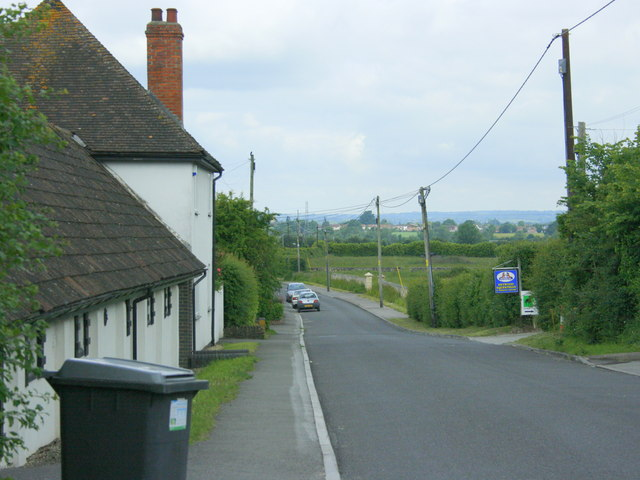
- Church Road, Heywood

- Location within Wiltshire
- Population: 798 (in 2011)
- OS grid reference: ST873536
- Civil parish: Heywood
- Unitary authority: Wiltshire
- Ceremonial county: Wiltshire
- Region: South West
- Country: England
- Sovereign state: United Kingdom
- Post town: Westbury
- Postcode district: BA13
- Dialling code: 01373
- Police: Wiltshire
- Fire: Dorset and Wiltshire
- Ambulance: South Western
- UK Parliament: South West Wiltshire
- Website: Parish Council

Heywood is a civil parish and small village in the county of Wiltshire in southwestern England. The village is approximately 1.5 miles (2.4 km) north of Westbury and 3.5 miles (5.6 km) south of the county town of Trowbridge.

Heywood village, which has approximately 200 inhabitants, lies between the A350 national route and the B3461 road, which links nearby Yarnbrook and the Westbury industrial area. The hamlet of Dursley lies directly to the west of the village on the other side of the railway line. The parish also includes the hamlets of Hawkeridge and Norleaze; in the south are the West Wilts Trading Estate and part of The Ham, close to Westbury.

The Biss Brook forms the west and north-west boundary of the parish.

== History ==
For most of its history, Heywood formed part of the parish and hundred of Westbury. From the 13th century the manor of Heywood was an estate of Stanley Abbey. It was acquired by Sir Edward Bayntun in 1537; later landowners included the Long family and the Earls of Marlborough.

In 1848 the Wilts, Somerset and Weymouth Railway was built through the parish, passing between Heywood and Dursley, to link the Swindon-Bath line (near Chippenham) with Westbury via Trowbridge. This line remains open.

The civil parish of Heywood was created in 1896 from the northern section of Westbury parish; part of Heywood was transferred back to Westbury in 1909.

=== Brook Hall ===
Brook Hall, in the west of Heywood parish near the Biss Brook, is a c. 1600 farmhouse which incorporates a Grade I listed wing of a 15th-century manor house.

=== Heywood House ===
Heywood House is a country house on the other side of the A350 from the village. It was built in 1839 in Jacobean style for H. G. G. Ludlow; his descendants included Henry Lopes, 1st Baron Ludlow (1828–1899), a Lord Justice of Appeal and member of Parliament. In 2015 the Grade II* listed house was divided into offices.

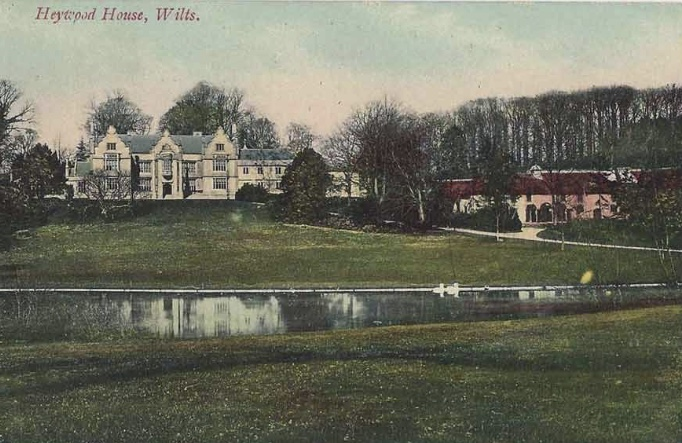
Heywood House, built 1837–1839, from a photo by Richard Wilkinson (1839–1901)

== Governance ==
From 1935 until 1974, Heywood was part of the Warminster and Westbury Rural District, which was abolished by the Local Government Act 1972, when it joined the new West Wiltshire district. Since the abolition of West Wiltshire as a district in 2009, all significant local government functions have been carried out by the new Wiltshire Council unitary authority.

Heywood falls within the South West Wiltshire parliamentary constituency, which has been represented since 2001 by Andrew Murrison (Conservative).

== Religious sites ==
A small Congregational church was built at Hawkeridge in 1844. As of 2015 the church remains in use.

The Church of England parish church of the Holy Trinity was built in 1849 and served a new ecclesiastical parish which was formed from the northern part of the parish of Westbury. The building is in the 13th-century style; Pevsner describes the east window of 1876 as "especially horrible". The church closed in 1981 and was converted for residential use.

== Amenities ==
There is a pub at Hawkeridge, the Royal Oak.

The village primary school was closed in 1971. It had been built in 1836 at the expense of Henry G.G. Ludlow of Heywood House and educated children of all ages until 1930.

The Eaves Learning Centre, just over the north boundary of the parish near Dursley, is a small independent school for children with special needs aged 8 to 19, run by Witherslack Group.

== Notable people ==
- Thomas Phipps (c. 1648 – 1715), of Heywood House, a City of London merchant
- William Phipps (c. 1681 – 1748), Governor of Bombay
- John Barnard Bush, Lord Lieutenant of Wiltshire 2004 to 2012, farmed at Heywood.
