= Baydon =

Coordinates: 51.500°N 01.597°W

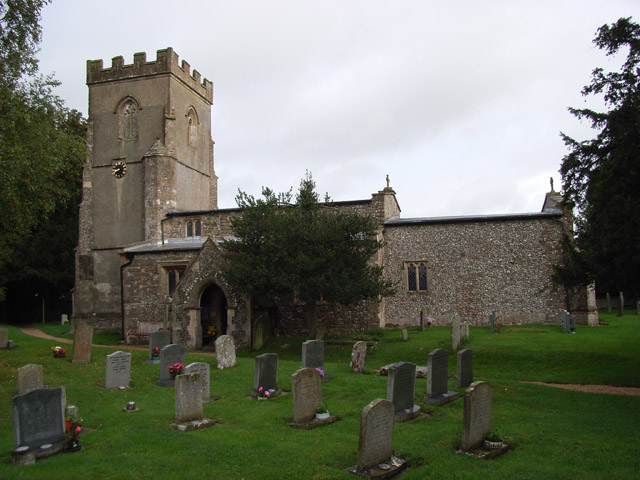
- St. Nicholas' parish church

- Location within Wiltshire
- Population: 653 (in 2021)
- OS grid reference: SU281780
- Unitary authority: Wiltshire
- Ceremonial county: Wiltshire
- Region: South West
- Country: England
- Sovereign state: United Kingdom
- Post town: Marlborough
- Postcode district: SN8
- Dialling code: 01672
- Police: Wiltshire
- Fire: Dorset and Wiltshire
- Ambulance: South Western
- UK Parliament: East Wiltshire
- Website: www.baydon.org

Baydon is a village and civil parish in Wiltshire, England about 10 miles (16 km) south-east of Swindon. The eastern boundary of the parish forms part of the county boundary with Berkshire, and the village is about 7 miles (11 km) north-west of the West Berkshire market town of Hungerford.

== History ==
Baydon is close to the Ridgeway, a pre-Roman road. The village is on the Ermin Way Roman road which runs north-west towards Cirencester and forms part of the western boundary of the parish. (The road is called Ermin Street locally but is not to be confused with the Ermine Street between London and York.)

The name Baydon likely means 'Beage's hill', derived from the Old English given name Beage (itself derived from Old English beag 'ring, armlet, torque') and Old English dun "hill, mountain".

The earliest known reference to Baydon is in 1196. The land was part of the Bishop of Salisbury's Ramsbury estate until most of it was sold in the later 17th century. Later landowners include Sir Francis Burdett (1770–1844), a long-serving Member of Parliament who married Sophia Coutts, a daughter of the wealthy banker Thomas Coutts. Their daughter Angela inherited the Coutts fortune, and her philanthropy included rebuilding several cottages in the village between 1875 and 1890.

Bailey Hill farm, the demesne land of Ramsbury manor in the north of the parish, was sold in 1681 and passed through several owners until it was bought by Lord Craven in 1800; it remained in Craven ownership until 1947. In the south of the parish, the land of Baydon House farm also had a succession of owners from the 17th century. The Wiltshire Victoria County History traces the ownership of other smaller estates. One source states that Sir Isaac Newton had an estate at Baydon, which he gave away shortly before his death in 1727.

The population of the parish peaked at 380 around the time of the 1861 census, then fell steadily to 213 in 1921 before rising sharply from the 1960s, as it became a dormitory community for people working in Swindon.

Until the 1790s, when it became an independent ecclesiastical parish, Baydon was a tithing and chapelry of Ramsbury parish within Ramsbury hundred.

The M4 motorway which passes just north of the village was opened on 22 December 1971.

== Religious sites ==
=== Parish church ===
The Church of England parish church, dedicated since the 19th century to Saint Nicholas, has a Norman nave and two-bay north arcade, while the south aisle and northern clerestory are Early English Gothic. The north aisle was rebuilt in 1857–1858 by the Gothic Revival architect G.E. Street, who also designed a new east window. The south clerestory is Perpendicular Gothic. The west window, dated 1928, is by Edward Woore and is a memorial to the Rev. Augustus Gibson. The church is Grade II* listed.

The font, partly octagonal, is probably from the 13th century. The three bells are dated 1744 (cast nearby at Aldbourne by John Stares), 1670 and 1650.

The church was dependent on Holy Cross at Ramsbury, and the prebendary of Ramsbury appointed chaplains until the living became a perpetual curacy in the 19th century. In 1956 the incumbent was authorised to hold both Aldbourne and Baydon, and the two benefices were united in 1965. Today the church is one of six in the Whitton grouping.

=== Others ===
A Particular Baptist chapel named Providence Chapel was built in 1806; it closed between 1885 and 1922, then was demolished. A Wesleyan Methodist chapel was built in 1823; by 1939 it was a private house.

== Notable buildings ==
A barn at Finches Farm, with flint walls and a generous thatched roof, is from the 17th century. Baydon House Farmhouse has a 1744 date-stone. The school (1843, next to the church) and the former vicarage (1857, west of the church) were designed by Wiltshire architect T. H. Wyatt, in brick with flint bands.

The water tower on Finches Lane near the M4, designed in the 1970s by Edmund Percey for Scherrer and Hicks, is described by Pevsner as "a striking design ... the tank clasped by tapering concrete piers".

== Amenities ==
The village school is now Baydon St Nicholas Church of England Voluntary Aided Primary School.

Baydon Village Stores incorporates a Post Office. The village pub, the Red Lion (closed in 2019), has however reopened as a restaurant/bar under the new name Fancy B.

Baydon is close the local Motorway, the M4, which provides easy access to Bristol to the west and London to the east.

== Notable residents ==
Ian Lomax (1931–1996, cricketer) farmed near Baydon.

Kevin Wilkinson (1958–1999, pop musician) lived at Baydon.
