= Highworth Rural District =

Former local government area in the UK

Coordinates: 51°37′N 01°42′W

Highworth
- History
  - Created: 1894
  - Abolished: 1974
  - Succeeded by: Thamesdown
- Status: Rural district

Highworth Rural District was a rural district in the county of Wiltshire, England. It lay to the north and east of the town and municipal borough of Swindon.

Following the Local Government Act 1972, on 1 April 1974 the district was merged with the municipal borough of Swindon to form the Borough of Thamesdown.

== Civil parishes ==
At the time of its dissolution it consisted of the following civil parishes to the north and east of Swindon.

- Bishopstone
- Blunsdon St Andrew
- Castle Eaton
- Chiseldon (included Draycot Foliat, added to Chiseldon in 1894)
- Hannington
- Haydon Wick
- Highworth
- Inglesham
- Liddington
- Little Hinton
- Rodbourne Cheney
- South Marston
- Stanton Fitzwarren
- Stratton St Margaret
- Wanborough
- Wroughton
