= Marlborough and Ramsbury Rural District =

Former local government area in the UK

Coordinates: 51.420°N 1.730°W

Marlborough and Ramsbury was a rural district in Wiltshire, England from 1935 to 1974.

It was formed by a County Review Order in 1935 as a merger of the Marlborough Rural District and the Ramsbury Rural District. It entirely surrounded the municipal borough of Marlborough.

In 1974, it was abolished under the Local Government Act 1972, becoming part of the new Kennet district.

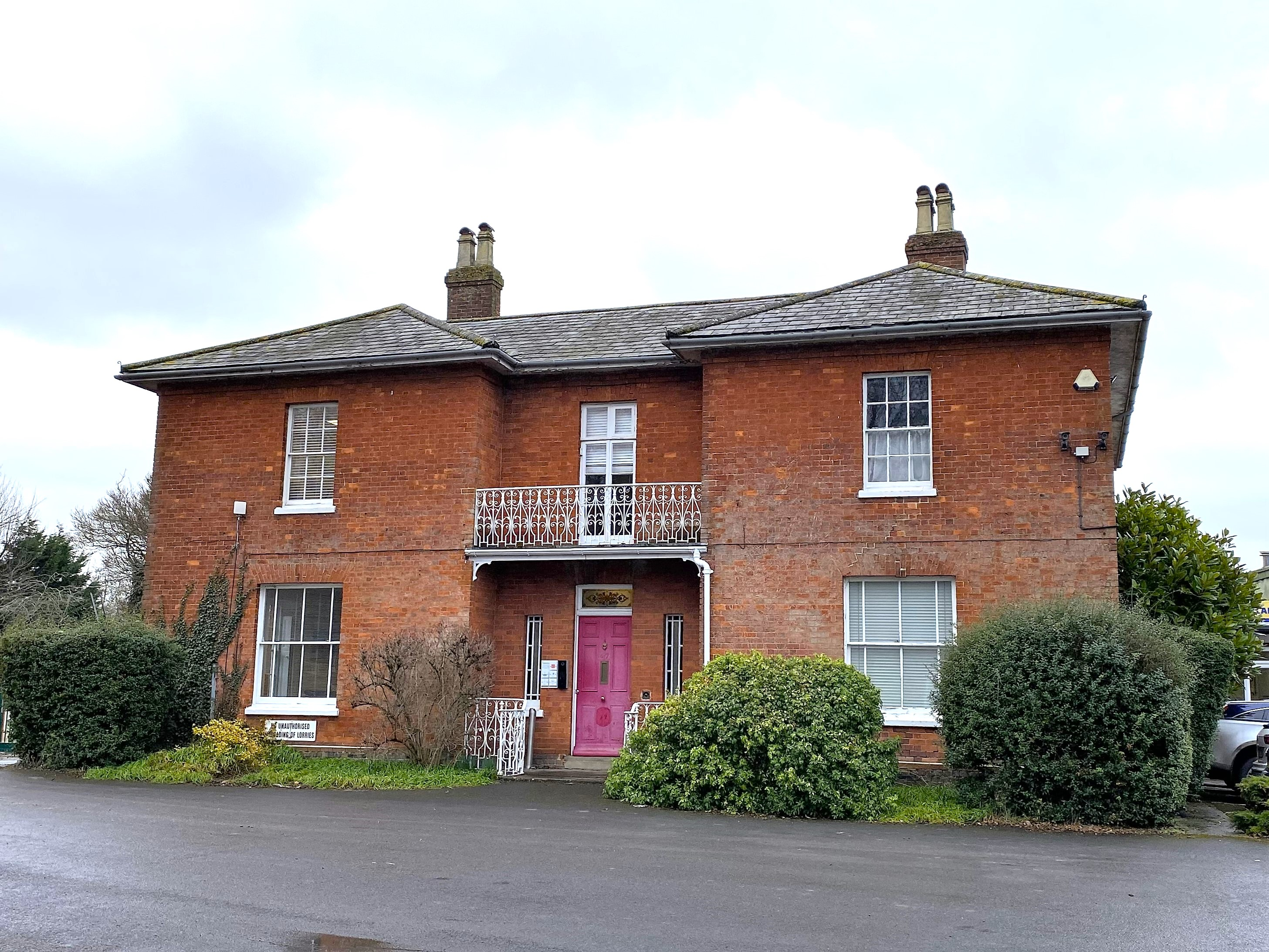
Axholme House, 47 London Road, Marlborough

In 1945 the council bought a large Georgian house called Axholme House at 47 London Road in Marlborough and converted it to become its headquarters. The council remained based there until its abolition in 1974.
