= Sherrington =

Village in Wiltshire, England

Coordinates: 51.151°N 2.059°W

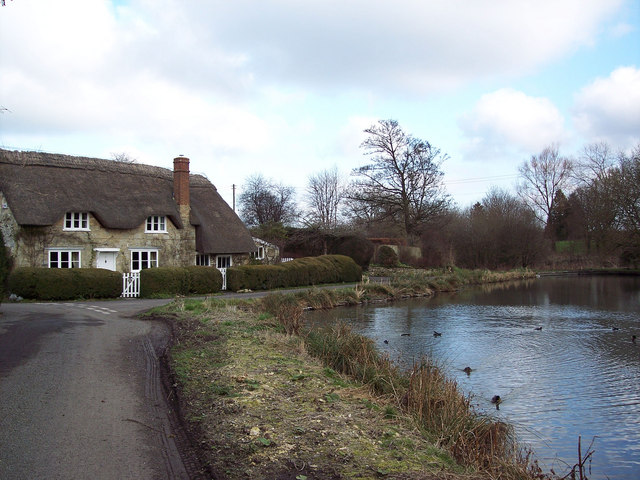
- Sherrington Pond

- Location within Wiltshire
- Population: 66 (in 2011)
- OS grid reference: ST959391
  - London: 88 mi (142 km) ENE
- Civil parish: Sherrington
- Unitary authority: Wiltshire
- Ceremonial county: Wiltshire
- Region: South West
- Country: England
- Sovereign state: United Kingdom
- Post town: WARMINSTER
- Postcode district: BA12
- Dialling code: 01985
- Police: Wiltshire
- Fire: Dorset and Wiltshire
- Ambulance: South Western
- UK Parliament: South West Wiltshire

Sherrington is a small village and civil parish on the River Wylye in Wiltshire, England.

The part of the Great Ridge Wood known as Snailcreep Hanging lies entirely within Sherrington.

== Location ==
Sherrington is near the larger village of Codford and is near the edge of Salisbury Plain. It is 7 miles (11 km) southeast of the town of Warminster and 13 miles (21 km) northwest of the city of Salisbury. Sherrington is part of the Cranborne Chase & West Wiltshire Downs Area of Outstanding Natural Beauty.

== History ==
There are a number of prehistoric barrows in the parish.

Sherrington has the remains of a motte-and-bailey castle, presumed to have been made late in the 11th or early in the 12th century. Now a scheduled ancient monument, the mound rises to a height of 5.5 m and is 48 m across.

The village has a large mill pond.

The Post Office Directory of Hampshire, Wiltshire, and Dorsetshire (1855) says of Sherrington:

SHERRINGTON is a township and parish on the river Wily, in the Hundred of Branch and Dole, and Warminster Union, South Wilts, 7½ miles south of Warminster station, 121½ from London, and 4 from Heytesbury. The living is a rectory, value £238, in the archdeaconry and diocese of Salisbury, and in the patronage of the Rev. Arthur Fane, B. A., vicar of Warminster, to whom the manor belongs; the Rev. Mason Anderson is the incumbent. The church of St Michael is a small edifice, with a bell turret; its east and west windows are finely decorated. Population, in 1851, 189; acreage, 1,280; rateable value, £1,023. On the downs are some ancient relics.

== Parish church ==
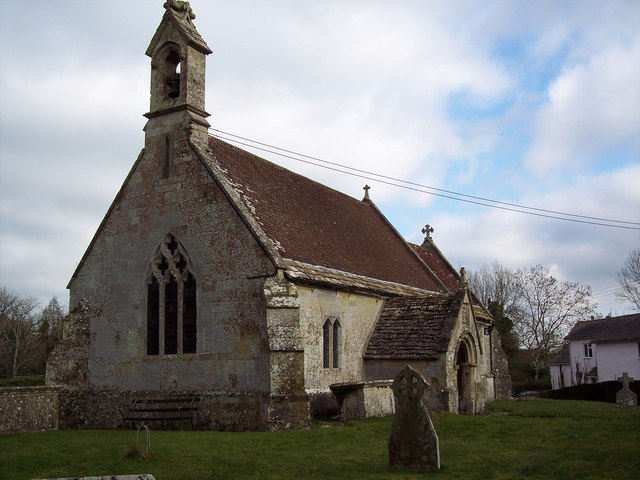
Church of St Cosmas and St Damian

Sherrington had a parish church by 1252, which was dedicated to Saints Cosmas and Damian by 1341. It was completely rebuilt in 1624, re-using the early 14th century east and west windows of the original building. The west bellcot was added in the 19th century.

The octagonal stone font is from the 13th century. Other fittings, including pews and the pulpit, are 17th-century and described by English Heritage as "little altered". On the plaster walls are painted cartouches with Biblical texts, one dated 1630. The church was recorded as Grade I listed in 1968.

The benefice was united with Boyton in 1909, although the parishes remained distinct. Today the parish is served by the Upper Wylye Valley Team, which covers ten rural parishes.

== Other buildings ==
The Old Rectory is a late 17th-century building, extended and altered in the 19th. Under the thatched roof, the north front is in dressed limestone.

== Local government ==
Most local government services are provided by Wiltshire Council, which has its offices in Trowbridge, some twelve miles to the north. With fewer than one hundred residents, Sherrington has no elected parish council, and instead has a Parish Meeting at which all electors may attend and vote.

Boundary changes in 2010 created a new constituency of South West Wiltshire which incorporates the parish. Sherrington's current Member of Parliament is Andrew Murrison, while its representative in the Wiltshire Council unitary authority is Christopher Newbury. Both are Conservatives.

== Sources ==
- Baggs, A. P.; Freeman, Jane; Stevenson, Janet H. (1995). "Parishes: Sherrington". In Crowley, D. A. (ed.). A History of the County of Wiltshire, Volume 15. Victoria County History. University of London. pp. 234–242 – via British History Online.
- Pevsner, Nikolaus; Cherry, Bridget (revision) (1975). The Buildings of England: Wiltshire. Harmondsworth: Penguin Books. p. 469. ISBN 0-14-071026-4.
