= Great Hinton =

Village in Wiltshire, England

Coordinates: 51.330°N 02.134°W

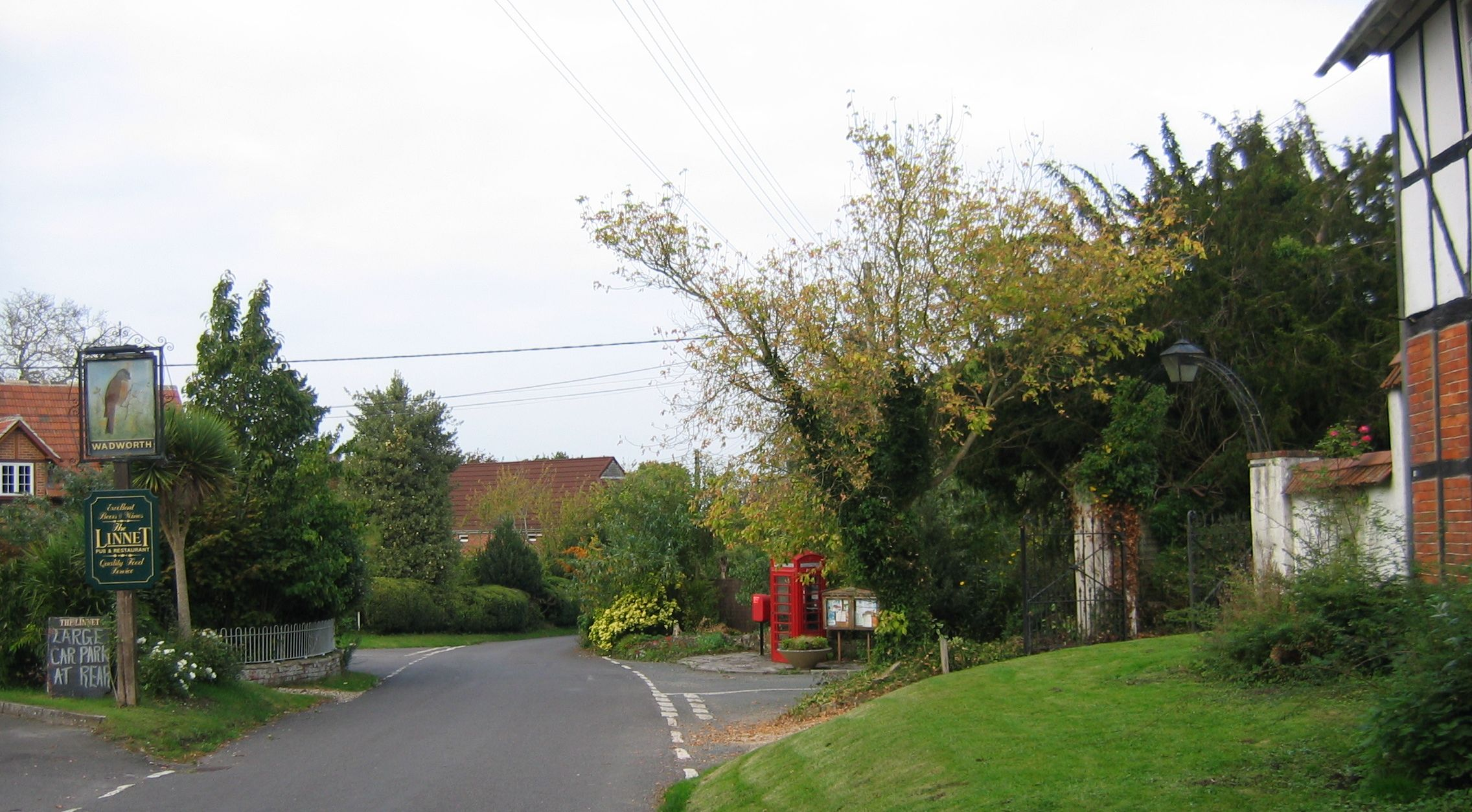
- Village centre

- Location within Wiltshire
- Population: 171 in (2011)
- OS grid reference: ST908590
- Civil parish: Great Hinton
- Unitary authority: Wiltshire
- Ceremonial county: Wiltshire
- Region: South West
- Country: England
- Sovereign state: United Kingdom
- Post town: Trowbridge
- Postcode district: BA14
- Dialling code: 01380
- Police: Wiltshire
- Fire: Dorset and Wiltshire
- Ambulance: South Western
- UK Parliament: Melksham and Devizes
- Website: Village

Great Hinton is a small village and civil parish about 3 miles (4.8 km) south of Melksham and 3.5 miles (5.6 km) north-east of Trowbridge in Wiltshire, England. The parish includes the hamlets of Bleet and Cold Harbour.

== History ==
The parish was a tithing of the ancient parish of Steeple Ashton. Landholdings amounting to 17 virgates were recorded at Hinton in 1340. There were ancient settlements in the area as shown by the medieval earthworks to the north of the village, and the ancient "holloway" running south and east of Church Farm.

Great Hinton became a civil parish in the late 19th century. In 1884, small detached areas of the parish were transferred to Hilperton parish.

There is no church in the parish. Today, Great Hinton is within the area of the benefice of North Bradley, Southwick, Heywood and Steeple Ashton. Both Primitive Methodists and Wesleyan Methodists built small chapels in the mid-19th century; neither of them is still in use.

In 2012, the village was judged to be "best kept small village" in Wiltshire.

== Notable buildings ==
Great Hinton had a public house, The Linnet (originally called The New Inn), which closed in 2011. It is a Grade II listed building that was built in brick in the mid-18th century and has a brewhouse dated 1816; Julian Orbach describes the mansard roof of the brewhouse as an addition for a miniature woollen factory. The interior of the building has been modernised but the chamfered beams remain.

The Manor House is from the early 19th century and is also a Grade II listed building. It is a detached house constructed of dressed limestone, with a hipped roof of Welsh slate and brick chimney stacks. It is a two-storey building with three windows at the front on the upper floor and two on the ground floor with a central door. Other listed buildings in the village include Church Farmhouse, New Barn Farmhouse and Fore Street Farmhouse, which all date from the 17th century, and Old Mill Cottage from much the same date. On Back Street, a pair of brick and stone houses which bear a 1791 date are now a single dwelling called Thornhill Cottage.
