= St Nicholas's Church, Fisherton Delamere =

St Nicholas' Church
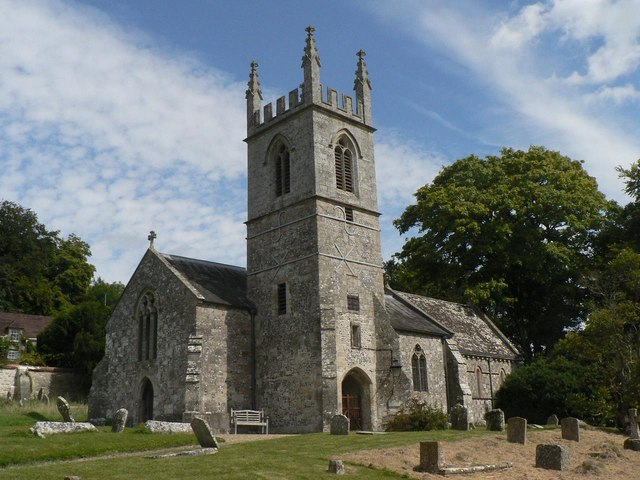

- Location within Wiltshire
- 51.1460°N 2.0000°W
- Location: Fisherton Delamere, Wiltshire, England

History
- Built: 14th century

Listed Building – Grade II*
- Official name: Church of St. Nicholas
- Designated: 23 March 1960
- Reference no.: 1183381

St Nicholas's Church in Fisherton Delamere, Wiltshire, England, was built in the 14th century. It is recorded in the National Heritage List for England as a designated Grade II* listed building, and is now a redundant church in the care of the Churches Conservation Trust. It was declared redundant on 1 June 1982, and was vested in the Trust on 30 October 1984.

The church, which is built in a chequerboard pattern of flint and stone, sits on a hill overlooking the River Wylye. It was built on the site of a Norman church in the 14th century and was substantially rebuilt in the 19th century. In the 1830s and 1860s John Davis organised the work including the demolition and rebuilding of the chancel under the supervision of W. Hardwick, a Warminster surveyor. It has a two-stage tower which is supported by diagonal buttresses.

Inside the church is a Minton tiled reredos which may date from the 1861 rebuilding. The screen was designed by Frederick Charles Eden and installed in 1912 while carrying out other work on the church. Because of local objections the screen was never painted. The cylindrical font dates from the 12th century. One of the bells was transferred to Wylye church in 1975; two of the remaining four were cast by James Burrough of Devizes in 1745, and two by Mears in 1844.

William Herbert Allen (1863–1943), a landscape watercolour artist whose career spanned more than 50 years from the 1880s to the 1940s, is buried in the churchyard.

== Parish ==
The benefice was united with Wylye in 1929, and the parsonage house at Fisherton was to be sold, although the parishes remained distinct; at the same time the portion of the parish south of the river was transferred to Stockton parish. Stockton was added to the benefice in 1957, and in 1973 a united benefice of Wylye, Fisherton Delamere and The Langfords (Steeple Langford and Little Langford) was created. The next year, the parishes of Wylye and Fisherton Delamere were united.

== See also ==
- List of churches preserved by the Churches Conservation Trust in South West England
