= Great Ridge Wood =

Woodland in southern Wiltshire, England

Coordinates: 51.127°N 2.101°W

Great Ridge Wood, formerly also known as Chicklade Wood, is one of the largest woodlands in southern Wiltshire, England. Mostly within the parishes of Boyton and Sherrington, and entirely within the Cranborne Chase and West Wiltshire Downs Area of Outstanding Natural Beauty, it lies on a chalk downland ridge above the River Wylye. To the south are the villages of Chicklade and Fonthill Bishop, while to the north are Boyton, Corton, Sherrington and Stockton. To the east of the wood, on the same ridge, lies another large block of woodland, Grovely Wood.

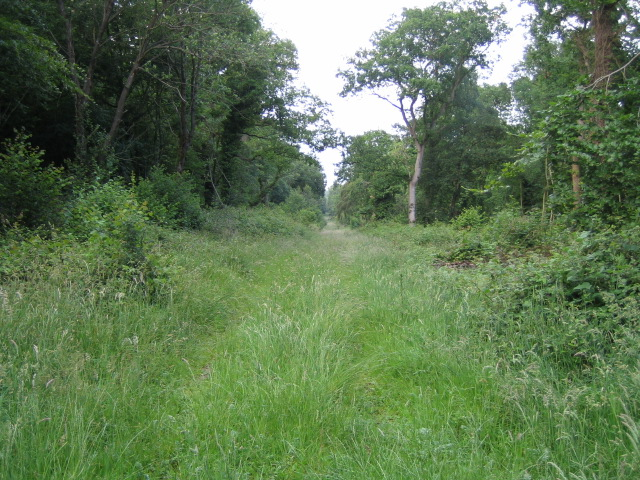
Part of the Great Ridge Wood near Chicklade

A Roman road runs from east to west through the centre of the wood, and it has two ancient monuments within it. In recognition of its nature conservation importance, the wood is designated by Wiltshire Council as a County Wildlife Site.

== Names and ownership ==
Both names for the wood, Great Ridge and Chicklade, are old. The Penny Cyclopaedia of 1843 says:

"Between the Wily and the Nadder ... are two tolerably extensive woods, Grovely Wood, near Wilton, and the Great Ridge Wood."

The 'Great Ridge Wood' is referred to in W. H. Hudson's A Shepherd's Life (1910), in which he reports that in the 19th century the old people of Fonthill Bishop and other villages were allowed to take from it as much dead wood as they could find.

As with most land in Great Britain, the Great Ridge is owned by people or organisations. Much of the area is owned by the Fonthill Estate and they operate timber gathering, shoots and hunts in the area.

== Highwaymen ==
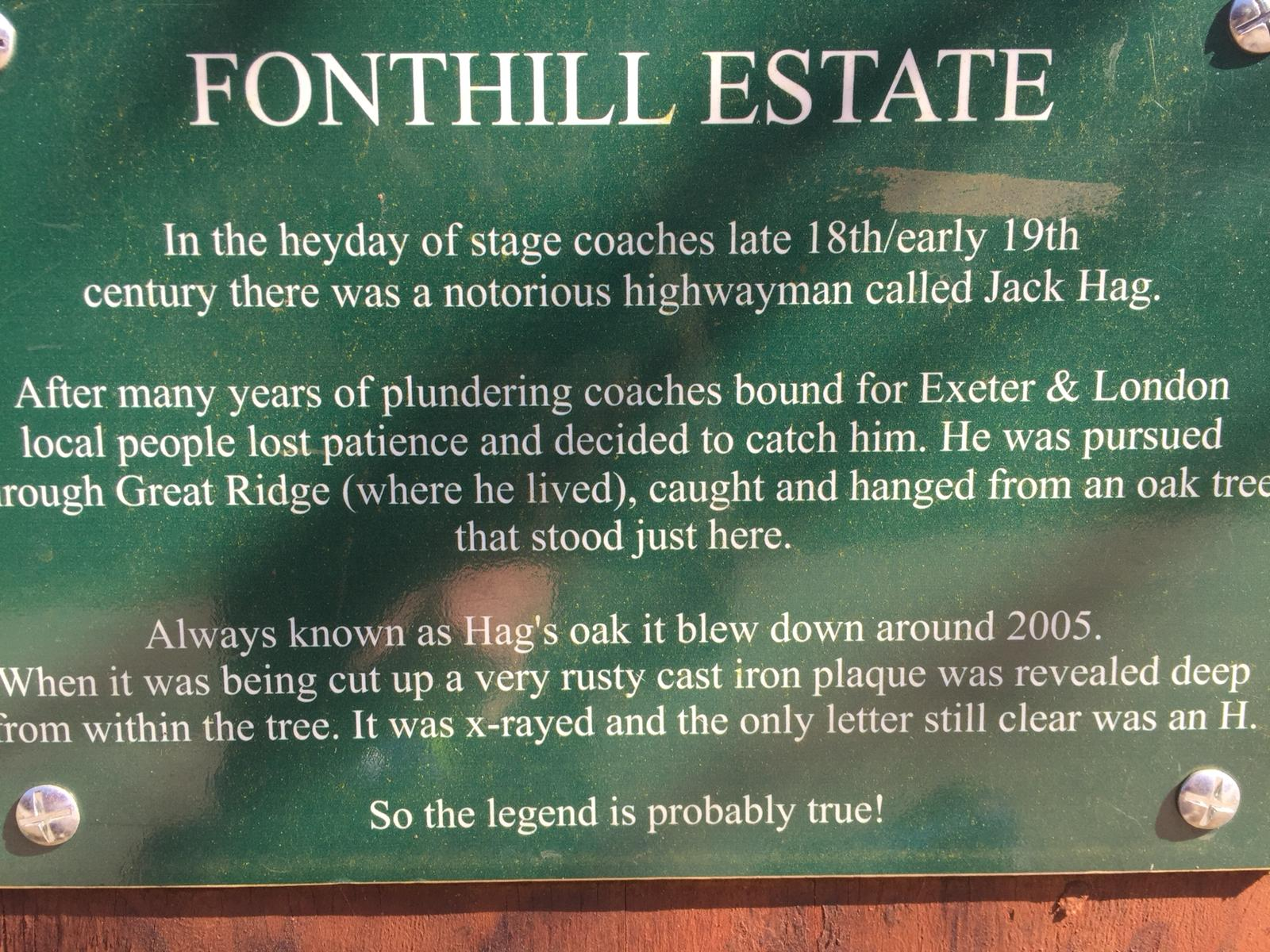
Sign in the wood telling the tale of highwayman Jack Hag

In the 18th and 19th centuries, there were notorious highwaymen (armed criminals) who preyed upon stagecoaches on the way to London or Exeter.

Legend has it that one highwayman, Jack Hag, lived in the Great Ridge and attacked these coaches. One day, local people pursued him into the wood, caught him and executed him by hanging him from an oak tree. The oak became known as 'Hag's Oak' and when the tree was blown down in a storm in 2005, an old "rusty cast iron plaque was revealed deep within the tree" after being cut up for timber. The only still clear letter was the letter 'H'.

== See also ==
- History of Wiltshire
