= Longbridge Deverill =

Village in Wiltshire, England

Coordinates: 51.165°N 2.187°W

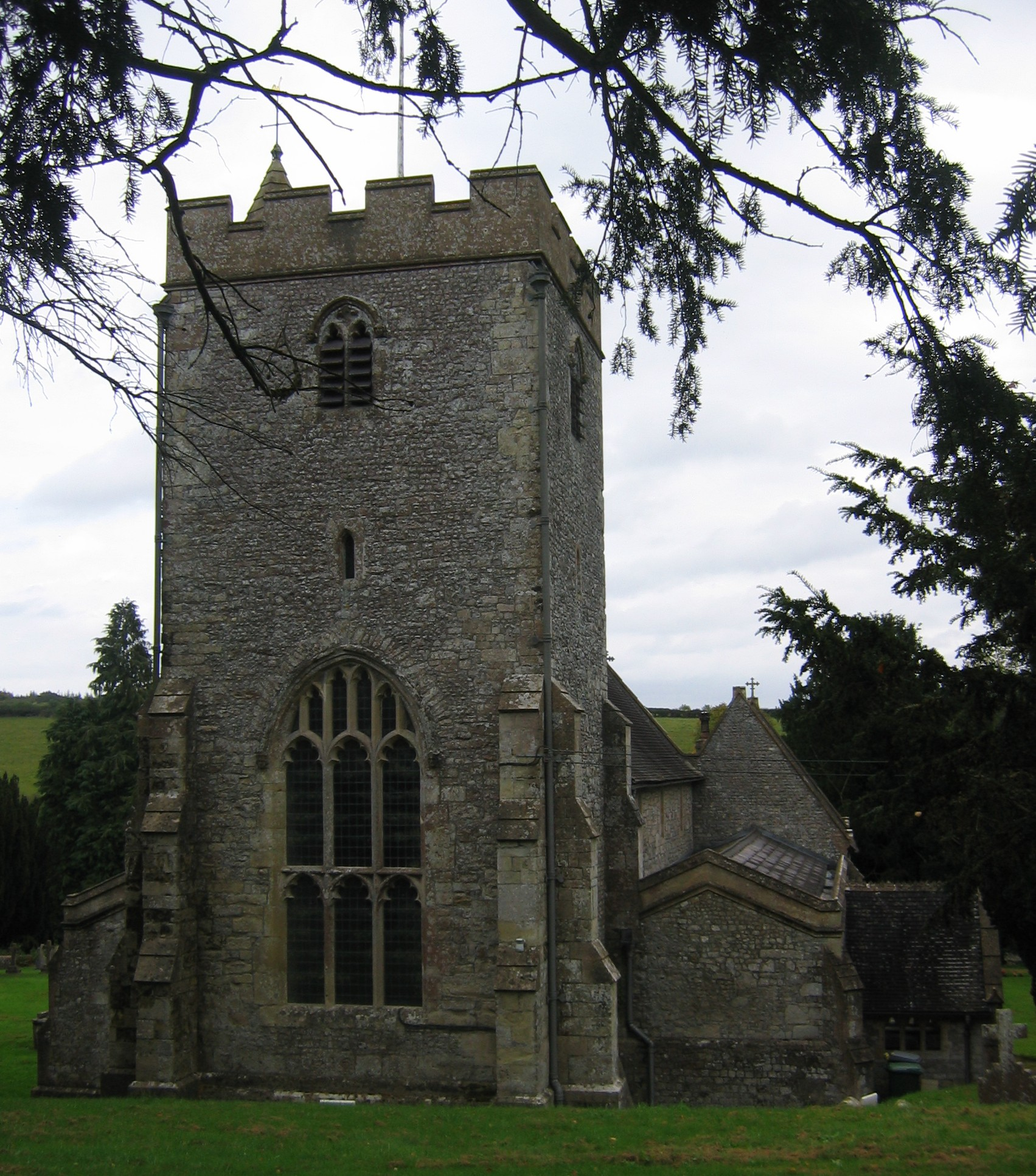
- St Peter and St Paul parish church

- Location within Wiltshire
- Population: 821 (in 2011)
- OS grid reference: ST869409
- Civil parish: Longbridge Deverill
- Unitary authority: Wiltshire
- Ceremonial county: Wiltshire
- Region: South West
- Country: England
- Sovereign state: United Kingdom
- Post town: Warminster
- Postcode district: BA12
- Dialling code: 01985
- Police: Wiltshire
- Fire: Dorset and Wiltshire
- Ambulance: South Western
- UK Parliament: South West Wiltshire
- Website: Parish Council

Longbridge Deverill is a village and civil parish about 2.5 miles (4.0 km) south of Warminster in Wiltshire, England. It is on the A350 primary route which connects the M4 motorway and west Wiltshire with Poole, Dorset.

The parish is in the Deverill valley which carries the upper waters of the River Wylye. It includes the small village of Crockerton and the hamlets of Crockerton Green, Fox Holes and Hill Deverill; these settlements are collectively known as the Lower Deverills (the Upper Deverills being the upstream villages of Brixton Deverill, Monkton Deverill and Kingston Deverill).

An unnamed tributary of the Wylye rises in the northwest of the parish, forms the man-made Shearwater lake, and flows east through the valley below Crockerton to join the Wylye.

== History ==
Evidence of Neolithic activity includes a henge near Long Ivor Farm in the northeast of the parish. A Bronze Age bell barrow stands on a slope of Rook Hill in the southeast. Iron Age settlements include a site on high ground at Cow Down in the east of the parish, where there are foundations of a large enclosure. The site was excavated by Sonia Chadwick Hawkes between 1956 and 1960.

Two Roman roads crossed at Kingston Deverill. A short length of north–south road, probably a section of the route from Bath to Poole, survives on Brimsdown Hill and became part of the boundary with Maiden Bradley parish.

Land at Longbridge and Crockerton belonged to Glastonbury Abbey from the 10th century. Two estates were recorded in the 1086 Domesday Book at Devrel, with altogether 24 households.

The manor house at Hill Deverill dates from the 16th century and is Grade II* listed. The medieval village of Hill Deverill was to the west of the house. A hollow way, field boundaries and house platforms survive.

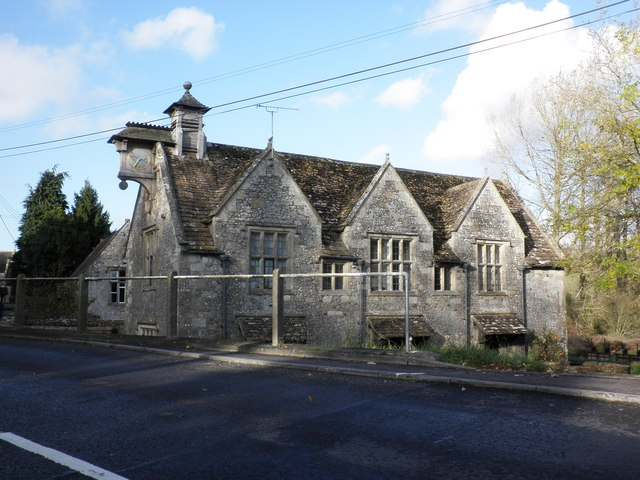
James Thynne House

In 1655, Sir James Thynne provided a terrace of three two-storey almshouses southeast of Longbridge Deverill church, built in rubble stone with slate roofs. A wooden clock face projects from the gable facing the main road.

In the 19th century a shortage of employment led to emigration to America, Canada or Australia; 181 people left from Longbridge. Pottery was made at Crockerton from locally dug clay, until the industry declined in the 19th century. Crockerton also had a cloth mill, later a silk mill, which closed in 1894.

== Religious sites ==
The Church of England parish church of Saints Peter and Paul is partly Norman: the three-bay north arcade is from the first half of the 12th century, and the font is from the same period. The church was consecrated by Thomas Becket. The tower and south arcade were built in the 14th century. There was partial rebuilding in the mid-nineteenth century, with various restorations between 1847 and 1860.

It has memorials to the Thynne family including John Thynne (1515–1580) who built Longleat House. The tower has eight bells, the oldest dated 1614. Today the church is a Grade II* listed building and forms part of the Cley Hill benefice.

Holy Trinity Church at Crockerton was built in 1843 as a chapel of ease at the expense of the Dowager Marchioness of Bath, to designs of Wyatt and Brandon. The church was declared redundant in 1973 and is in residential use.

There was a stone church at Hill Deverill in the twelfth century, dedicated to the Blessed Virgin Mary. The church was almost entirely rebuilt in 1842, financed by public subscription. It became redundant and was in residential use by 1985.

== Education ==
There was a National School at Longbridge Deverill in the 1840s, and a new building of 1851 accommodated 100 pupils. Owing to falling pupil numbers, the school was closed in March 1970 and pupils transferred to the school at Sutton Veny. The building remains in use as the village hall.

A school was built at Crockerton in 1845 at the expense of the Marquess of Bath, with capacity for 95 pupils. From 1930, children aged 11 and over went to the secondary school at Warminster. The school continues as Crockerton C of E Primary School.

== Local government ==
The parish elects a parish council. It falls within the area of the Wiltshire Council unitary authority, which is responsible for all significant local government functions.

The village falls in the Warminster Without electoral ward. This ward starts in the north at Upton Scudamore, avoids Warminster, then stretches south through Longbridge Deverell to end at Kingston Deverill. The total population of the ward taken at the 2011 census was 4,163.
