= Wylye Hoard =

Bronze Age hoard found in Wiltshire, England

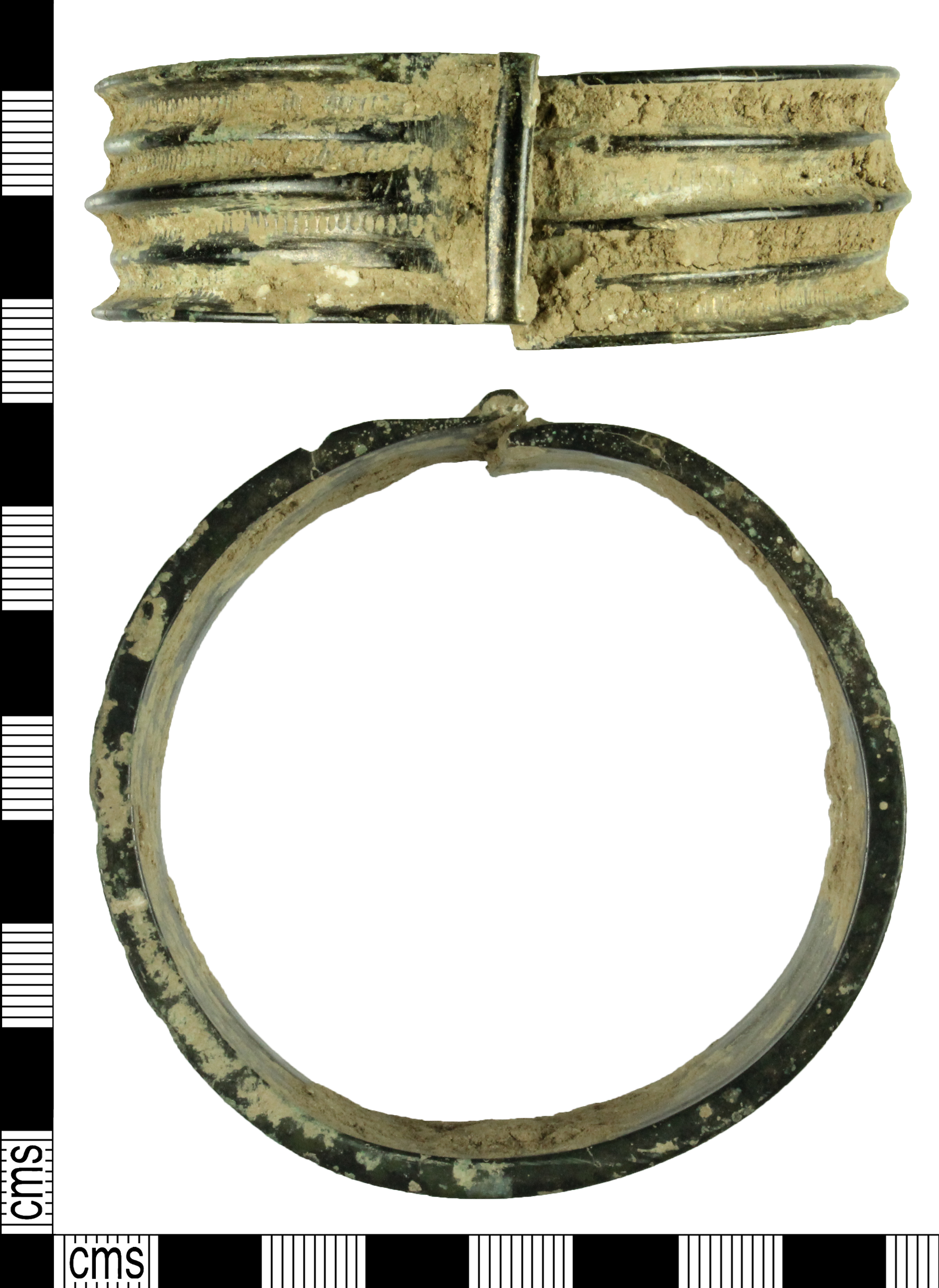
- Two views of a bracelet from the hoard, in as-found condition
- Material: Copper
- Size: 41 items
- Discovered: 2012
- Discovered by: Stuart Gullick; Michael Barker

The Wylye Hoard is a hoard of Bronze Age jewellery, discovered by metal detectorists in a cultivated field, north-east of the village of Wylye, Wiltshire, England, in 2012. In February 2014, it was declared treasure, under the terms of the Treasure Act 1996.

== Discovery ==
Two members of the "West London Archaeological Searchers", a metal-detecting group, Stuart Gullick and Michael Barker, found the hoard on 4 November 2012. The site was a hilltop location, close to the River Wylye.

== Composition ==
The find consists of 41 copper alloy objects split across two deposits or concentrations of finds, with a small number of finds found a short distance away. All the objects are of a similar typo-chronology and are likely to represent a single hoard comprising 31 'ornaments', 8 'tools' and 4 'other' or unidentified objects.

The artefacts were recovered by the finders from two deposits in close proximity (c.2-3m apart), with two pits subsequently identified by a local amateur archaeology group (the Wiltshire Archaeology Field Group) on 10 November 2012. There was, however, no opportunity to independently date the pit cuts. The first deposit appears to have been a closed deposit, with the finders noting that the torcs were 'stacked' on top of one another within the pit (verbal communication). The second deposit is likely to have been disturbed by agricultural operations as the objects were dispersed across a small area.

== Inquest ==
An inquest was held by the Salisbury coroner in February 2014 at which the hoard was declared to be treasure. After valuation by the Treasure Valuation Committee, the hoard was acquired by Salisbury & South Wiltshire Museum (since renamed The Salisbury Museum).

== Excavation ==
An archaeological excavation of the site was subsequently undertaken by the Wiltshire Archaeology Field Group. No further objects were found.
