= Ebsbury Down =

Protected area in Wiltshire, England

Coordinates: 51.11607°N 1.92423°W

Ebsbury Down (grid reference SU054352) is a 132-acre (53 ha) biological Site of Special Scientific Interest in Wiltshire, England, notified in 1975.

It lies on the southern slopes of the Wylye valley, adjacent to Grovely Wood and west of Great Wishford village. The diverse chalk grassland has a variety of plants and some prominent anthills.

== Sources ==
- "Ebsbury Down SSSI" (PDF). Natural England.
