= Grovely Wood =

Woodlands in Wiltshire, England

Coordinates: 51.107°N 1.932°W

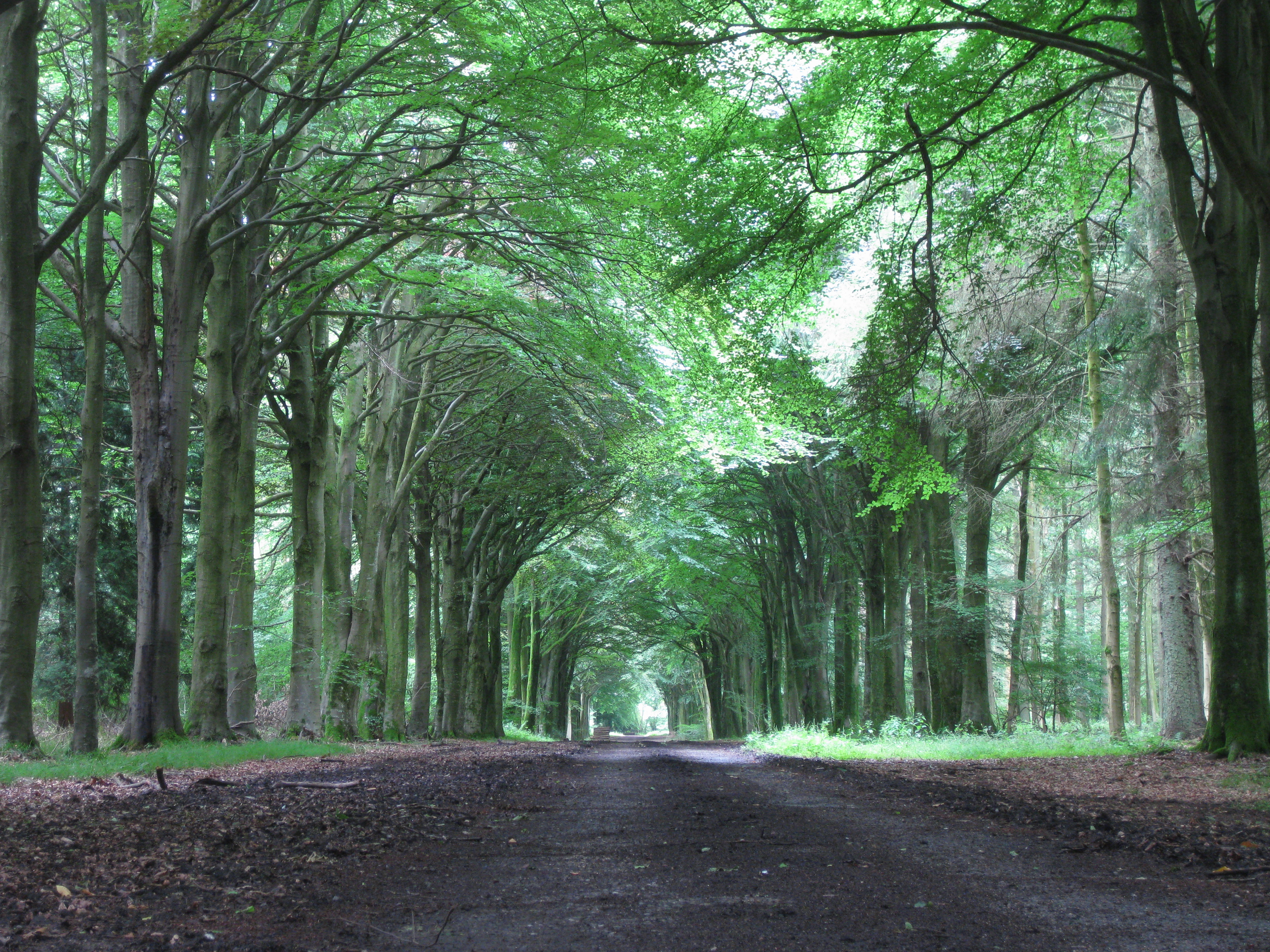
Beech trees lining a road through Grovely

Grovely Wood is one of the largest woodlands in southern Wiltshire, England. It stands on a chalk ridge above the River Wylye in Barford St Martin parish, to the south-west of the village of Great Wishford, within the Cranborne Chase and West Wiltshire Downs Area of Outstanding Natural Beauty. It is recognised for its nature conservation importance through designation as a County Wildlife Site. Among the species found here is the Purple Emperor butterfly.

To the west of Grovely, on the same ridge, lies another large block of woodland, Great Ridge Wood. Adjacent to Grovely, to the north, lies the grassland Site of Special Scientific Interest Ebsbury Down. Another SSSI, Baverstock Juniper Bank, is also nearby.

There is much Iron Age and Roman archaeology in the vicinity of the woods. A Roman road runs east to west through the centre of the wood, and at the western end are the Iron Age/Romano-British settlements of Hanging Langford Camp and Church End Ring. Just to the north of the woods lie the sites of two Iron Age hillforts, Ebsbury, and Grovely castle; as well as an Iron Age farm enclosure, known as East Castle.

== Boundaries ==
In the 13th century, Grovely Forest extended north and east to the River Wylye, and south to the Nadder; on its western boundary were the villages of Wylye and Teffont Evias.

At a Grovely swainmote held in March 1603, a jury drawn from Great Wishford and Barford St Martin declared that the forest then consisted of fourteen coppices. Seven lay north of 'Grim's Dyke' in Great Wishford, while the others lay south of the dyke in Barford St Martin. The combined areas of these fourteen coppices correspond to what was formerly the extra-parochial area of Grovely Wood. By 1839, the boundary of Barford parish had moved north to include almost all of the woodland.

Grovely Wood was an extra-parochial tract until 1858, when it became a civil parish. On 1 April 1934 the parish was abolished and merged with Barford St Martin. In 1931 the parish had a population of 31.

== Ancient custom ==
According to a mediaeval custom, villagers of Great Wishford have a right to gather firewood in Grovely Wood on 29 May, Oak Apple Day. On this day, villagers claim their ancient rights to collect wood from Grovely, said to date back to the Middle Ages and to have been confirmed by the Forest Court in 1603, thanks to a charter for the collection of wood in the Royal Forest of Groveley.

== Folklore ==
Grovely Wood has two stories associated with it.

=== The Handsel sisters ===
In the 18th century, four Handsel sisters of Danish origin lived in the Wilton area. After an outbreak of smallpox in 1737 killed 132 people, the local people became convinced that the sisters were responsible for the deaths and accused them of witchcraft and an alliance with the devil. Without an official hearing the sisters were taken to Grovely Wood, murdered by being bludgeoned over the head, and buried a little way apart from each other so that they could not conspire against their murderers. There are four gnarled beech trees associated with the sisters; because either the trees were planted to mark their graves or they mysteriously grew on top of the unmarked graves to remind the locals of their dreadful deed. Sightings of the sisters have been reported over the years. There is a hollow at the back of the largest tree where people leave offerings. The trees are approximately 50 metres from the Roman road, some ten minutes' walk from the Wilton end of the wood.

=== The Burcombe Woodsman ===
The Burcombe Woodsman is thought to be a poacher who was hanged from a tree for his 'crimes', or possibly an artist who painted in watercolour and was accidentally shot in the woods during a deer cull. It is said that he lodged in Burcombe thus earning him the title of the Burcombe Woodsman. Sightings of him have been reported, usually after hearing the cracking of a twig.

An image on Purbeck marble found at Steeple Langford in 1857, a portrait of a man wearing a long robe, with a horn hanging from his left shoulder, may be of Alan de Langford, Verderer of Grovely Wood at the end of the 13th century.

== The Beauties of England and Wales (1814) ==
The antiquary John Britton reports in a volume of his The Beauties of England and Wales (1814) that

...the Great Ridge Wood... was anciently conjoined with Grovely-Wood, but is now separated from it by an extent of nearly four miles of open down. The whole was then designated by the appellation of Grovely-Forest, and such it appears to have been so late as the thirty-third year of Queen Elizabeth, when a law-suit occurred between Edward, Earl of Hertford, and the Queen's Majesty, in behalf of Henry, Earl of Pembroke, concerning the bounds of the forest of Grovely in the county of Wilts, in which it was decided that the last perambulation of 28 Edward I, and no other, stood good in law. In the middle of this wood is a house still retaining the appellation of Grovely-Lodge. In traversing the boundaries of Grovely-Wood, the antiquary perceives several ancient works to arrest his attention, besides the entrenchments above noticed. These are denominated East-Castle, Grovely-Castle, Grovely-Works, and Hamshill ditches, of which the first three are situated on the southern side of the wood, and the last on its northern side opposite the village of Barford."

== Second World War ==
The Royal Air Force had an ordnance depot at Chilmark, west of the wood, during and after the Second World War, and parts of the wood provided cover for munitions storage. Until c. 1951, use was made of sidings at the nearest station, Wylye; the area was also used for the same purpose by the United States Air Force, via Wishford station.

== Present day ==
The Old Sarum Way long-distance footpath enters the wood.
