= Wylye =

Village in Wiltshire, England

Coordinates: 51.139°N 1.990°W

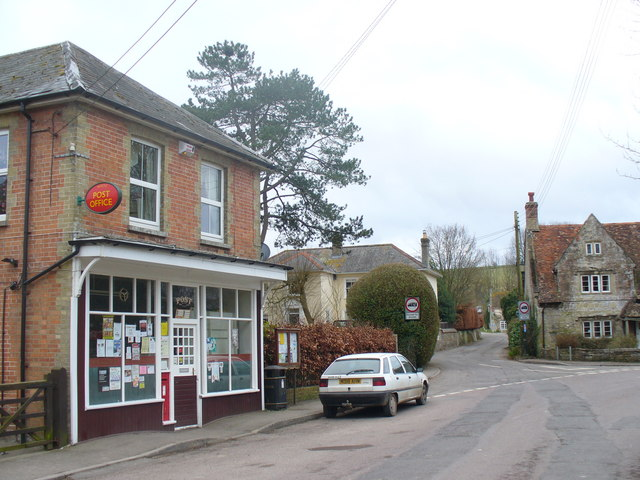
- Wylye Post Office

- Location within Wiltshire
- Population: 412 (in 2011)
- OS grid reference: SU008377
- Civil parish: Wylye
- Unitary authority: Wiltshire
- Ceremonial county: Wiltshire
- Region: South West
- Country: England
- Sovereign state: United Kingdom
- Post town: Warminster
- Postcode district: BA12
- Dialling code: 01985
- Police: Wiltshire
- Fire: Dorset and Wiltshire
- Ambulance: South Western
- UK Parliament: Salisbury
- Website: Parish Council

Wylye (/ˈwaɪli/) is a village and civil parish on the River Wylye in Wiltshire, England. The village is about 9 1/2 miles (15 km) northwest of Salisbury and a similar distance southeast of Warminster.

The parish extends north and south of the river, and includes the hamlet of Deptford. Today Deptford is at the junction of two primary roads, the A303 (London to the southwest) and the A36 (Southampton to Bristol). In 1934 half of Fisherton parish was added to Wylye, including the small village of Fisherton Delamere.

== History ==
A collection of Bronze Age jewellery found near the village by metal detectorists in 2012, known as the Wylye Hoard, is held by Salisbury Museum. Bilbury Rings, on the southern slope of the valley, is an Iron Age hillfort. Nearby is a prehistoric field system.

A Roman road from Winchester to the Mendips passes through the southern edge of the parish. The boundaries of Wyle manor, and possibly also of Deptford manor, were defined in the 10th century. Domesday Book in 1086 recorded a settlement at Wilet, and a mill, on land held by Wilton Abbey. Depeford (Deptford) also had a mill but only six households, on land held by Edward of Salisbury. In the 13th and early 14th centuries, the river marked the northern edge of Grovely Forest, as far downstream as Wylye.

The two parts of the parish were separate tithings. Wylye, south of the river, was in Chalke hundred, while Deptford together with Bathampton (now in Steeple Langford) formed a tithing of Heytesbury hundred.

Deptford manor passed through several owners until being acquired by the Dukes of Somerset in 1783; the 15th Duke sold Deptford farm in 1919.

After the dissolution, Wylye manor was bought in 1547 by Sir William Herbert (later Earl of Pembroke), and remained with the Pembrokes until 1918 when it was sold as separate farms.

Deptford had an inn from at least the early 18th century; it was demolished in the mid 19th. At the mill at Wylye, powered by the river, corn was ground or the fulling stage of cloth-making was carried out; at times it had both functions. A three-storey red-brick mill was built on the same site in 1872, and continued in use until 1962. A Congregational chapel was built in Wylye village in 1860 and closed in 2001.

The road from Amesbury to Mere passed through both Deptford and Wylye, and was turnpiked in 1761. The river crossing north of Wylye village, near the mill, was a ford until a bridge was built in the mid-18th century. The Wilton–Warminster road crosses the Amesbury road at Deptford, and was also turnpiked in 1761. These roads were designated as trunk roads: the A36 in 1946 and the A303 in 1958. In 1975 their junction was redesigned, with both upgraded to dual carriageways, the A303 diverted away from Wylye village, and the A36 passing close to the remnants of Deptford.

Most of the village was designated as a Conservation Area in 1975.

Fisherton Delamere village is about half a mile from Deptford, on the road towards Warminster; Fisherton tithing was anciently a detached part of Warminster hundred. When Fisherton parish was extinguished in 1934, its eastern part – including the village – was attached to Wylye parish.

== Parish church ==
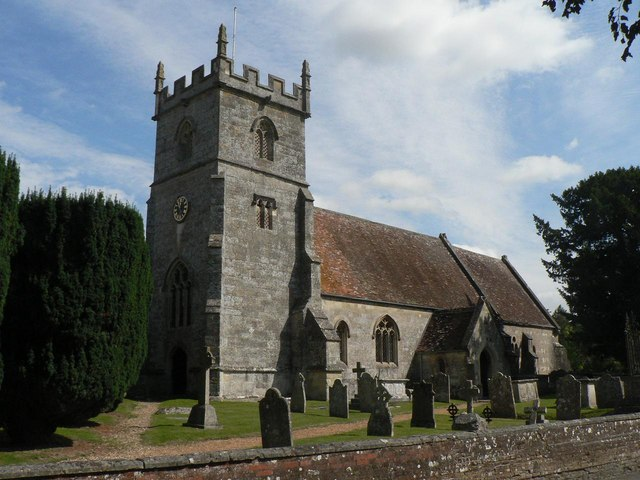
St Mary's Church

The first record of a rector at Wylye is in 1249. The present Church of England parish church of St Mary, in dressed limestone and flint, is largely an 1846 rebuilding to designs by Wyatt and Brandon, retaining only the 15th-century tower and the chancel walls, including the 13th-century east window. The church was designated as Grade II* listed in 1960.

The six bells include one cast c.1420 at Salisbury, and another in 1587 by John Wallis; the treble came from the redundant church at Fisherton. The matching pulpit, lectern and prayer desk were transferred from St Mary's a Wilton when it was demolished in the 1840s; the carved oak pulpit with large sounding board is dated 1628, and was considered by Pevsner to be a "splendid piece".

Rectors include Alexander Hyde, from 1634, who later was bishop of Salisbury.

Monuments in the churchyard include an area screened by 18th-century railings. The parish war memorial, erected soon after the First World War, also stands in the churchyard.

The benefice was united with Fisherton Delamere in 1929, and the parsonage house at Fisherton was to be sold, although the parishes remained distinct. Stockton was added to the benefice in 1957, and in 1973 a united benefice of Wylye, Fisherton Delamere and The Langfords (Steeple Langford and Little Langford) was created. The next year, the parishes of Wylye and Fisherton Delamere were united. Today the parish is part of the Wylye and Till Valley benefice, alongside eight others. Parish registers from 1581 are held at the Wiltshire and Swindon History Centre, Chippenham.

Deptford had a chapel which fell out of use in the 16th century; its site is unknown.

== Notable buildings ==
Deptford Farmhouse, now surrounded by roads, was built in dressed limestone in the late 17th century and altered in 1810; nearby is a timber-framed and weatherboarded granary from the early 19th century.

The former Wylye rectory, in stuccoed flint and limestone, is a substantial early 19th century building, as are Wylye House, a former farmhouse on the south bank of the river, and Court Farmhouse on the eastern edge of the village.

== Amenities ==
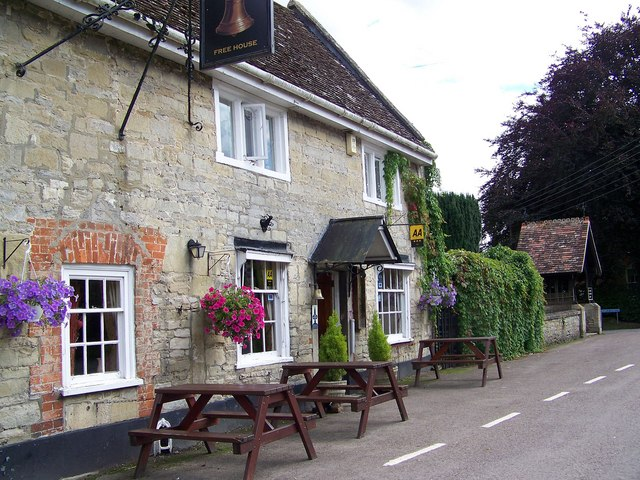
The Bell, a listed building

There is a pub, the Bell Inn (a 17th-century building on the High Street) and a village hall.

There is no school in the parish; the nearest primary school is at Codford. A National School was built near the church in 1873, superseding an earlier building. In 1938 children aged 11 and over were transferred to Wilton and the school closed in 1973 owing to the small number of pupils.

The Site of Special Scientific Interest known as Wylye and Church Dean Downs, and part of the Starveall and Stony Down site, are within the parish.

== Railway ==
The Salisbury branch line was built through the Wylye valley in 1856 by the Great Western Railway, passing close to the south of Wylye village. Wylye station was west of the level crossing on the road to Dinton, and from the 1940s to 1951 had sidings which served the RAF ordnance depot in Grovely Wood. The station was closed in 1955 when local passenger services were withdrawn; the line continues in use as part of the Wessex Main Line.

== Notable residents ==
W. H. Allen (1863-1943), landscape watercolour artist, lived in the parish from 1932. Michael Dobbs (born 1948), Baron Dobbs of Wylye, Conservative politician and author, lives in the parish.
