= Sheepwashing =

Painting by David Wilkie

- Artist: David Wilkie
- Year: 1817
- Type: Oil on panel, landscape painting
- Dimensions: 90 cm × 137 cm (35 in × 54 in)
- Location: Scottish National Gallery, Edinburgh

Sheepwashing is an 1817 landscape painting by the British artist David Wilkie. It depicts a rural scene of shepherds washing sheep near a watermill. Wilkie was an admirer of Dutch landscapes of the seventeenth century by Jacob van Ruisdael and Meindert Hobbema and the painting is reminiscent of their styles. It has been described as the only "pure landscape" that Wilkie ever exhibited.

The painting was displayed at the British Institution's annual exhibition in 1817. It was inspired by sketches he had made during an 1815 visit to Wiltshire. The scene shows the village of Fisherton de la Mere on the River Wylye near Salisbury. Today the painting is in the collection of the Scottish National Gallery, having been acquired in 1911. A watercolour study for the work is in the collection of the Royal Academy in London.

== Bibliography ==
- Tromans, Nicholas. David Wilkie: The People's Painter. Edinburgh University Press, 2007.
- Wright, Christopher, Gordon, Catherine May & Smith, Mary Peskett. British and Irish Paintings in Public Collections: An Index of British and Irish Oil Paintings by Artists Born Before 1870 in Public and Institutional Collections in the United Kingdom and Ireland.
