= Shearwater (lake) =

Lake in Wiltshire, England

- Shear Water
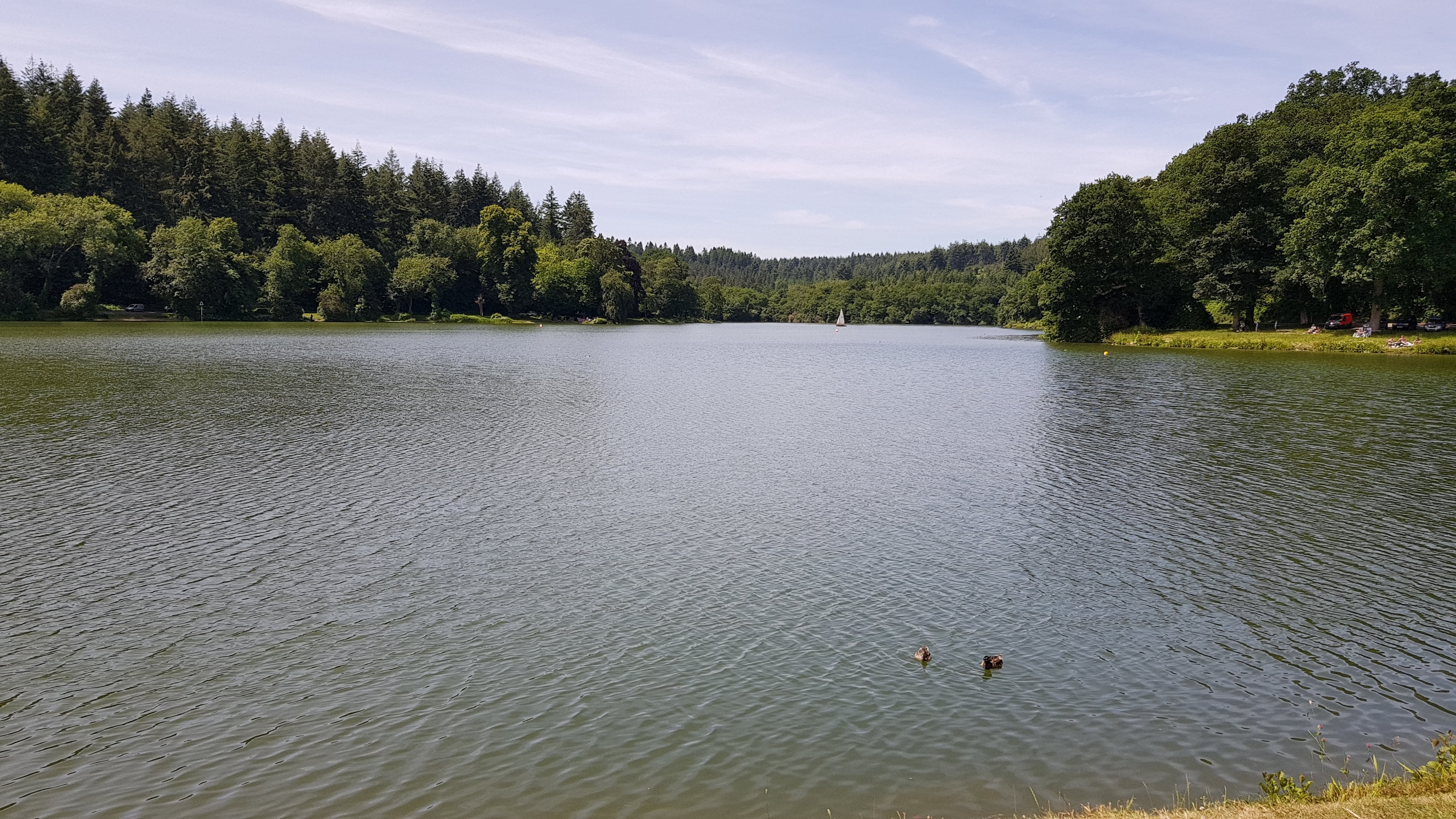

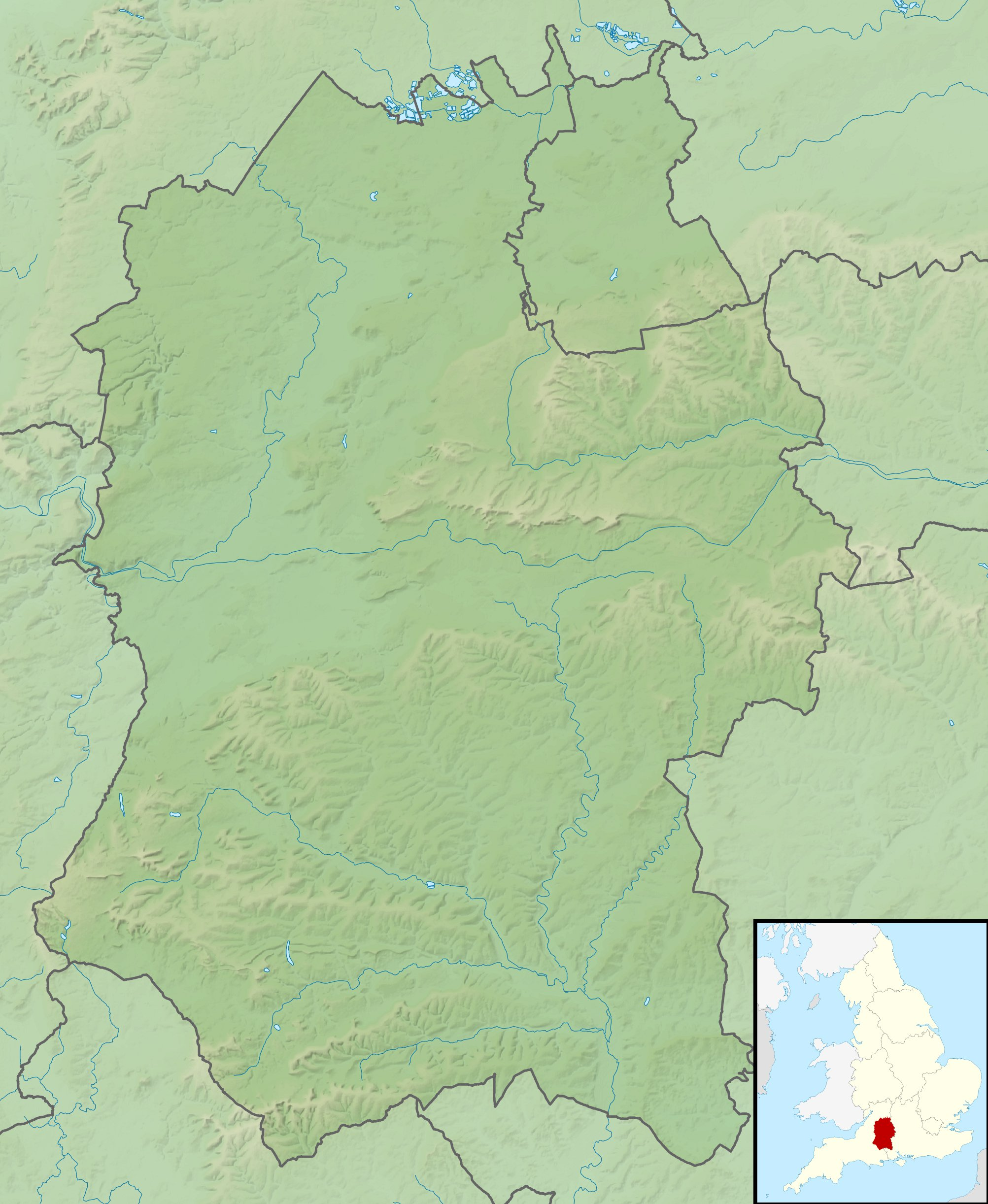
- Location within Wiltshire
- Location: Wiltshire
- Coordinates: 51.178°N 2.211°W
- Etymology: Carp
- Primary inflows: Streams
- Primary outflows: River Wylye
- Built: Late 18c
- Construction engineer: Frances Egerton
- Website: www.longleat.co.uk/fishing

Shearwater (or Shear Water) is a man-made freshwater lake near Crockerton village, about 2 1/4 miles (3.6 km) southwest of the town of Warminster in Wiltshire, England. The lake is formed from a tributary of the River Wylye.

It is within the Longleat Estate (which also contains a Safari Park) and is one of five lakes of various sizes. Shearwater Lake, the largest, was created at the end of the 18th century, and designed by the 3rd Duke of Bridgwater, Francis Egerton. It is fed by streams dammed by the then Marquis of Bath. The lake is surrounded by mature woodland and is popular with anglers, walkers (especially those with dogs), runners, and cyclists.

It is about 650 yards long. There is a tea-room at Bargate Cottage which accepts dogs inside.

The Shearwater Sailing Club has a boathouse and a variety of dinghies on the lake, the largest being sixteen feet (4.9 meters) in length.
