= Brixton Deverill =

Village in Wiltshire, England

Coordinates: 51.148°N 2.197°W

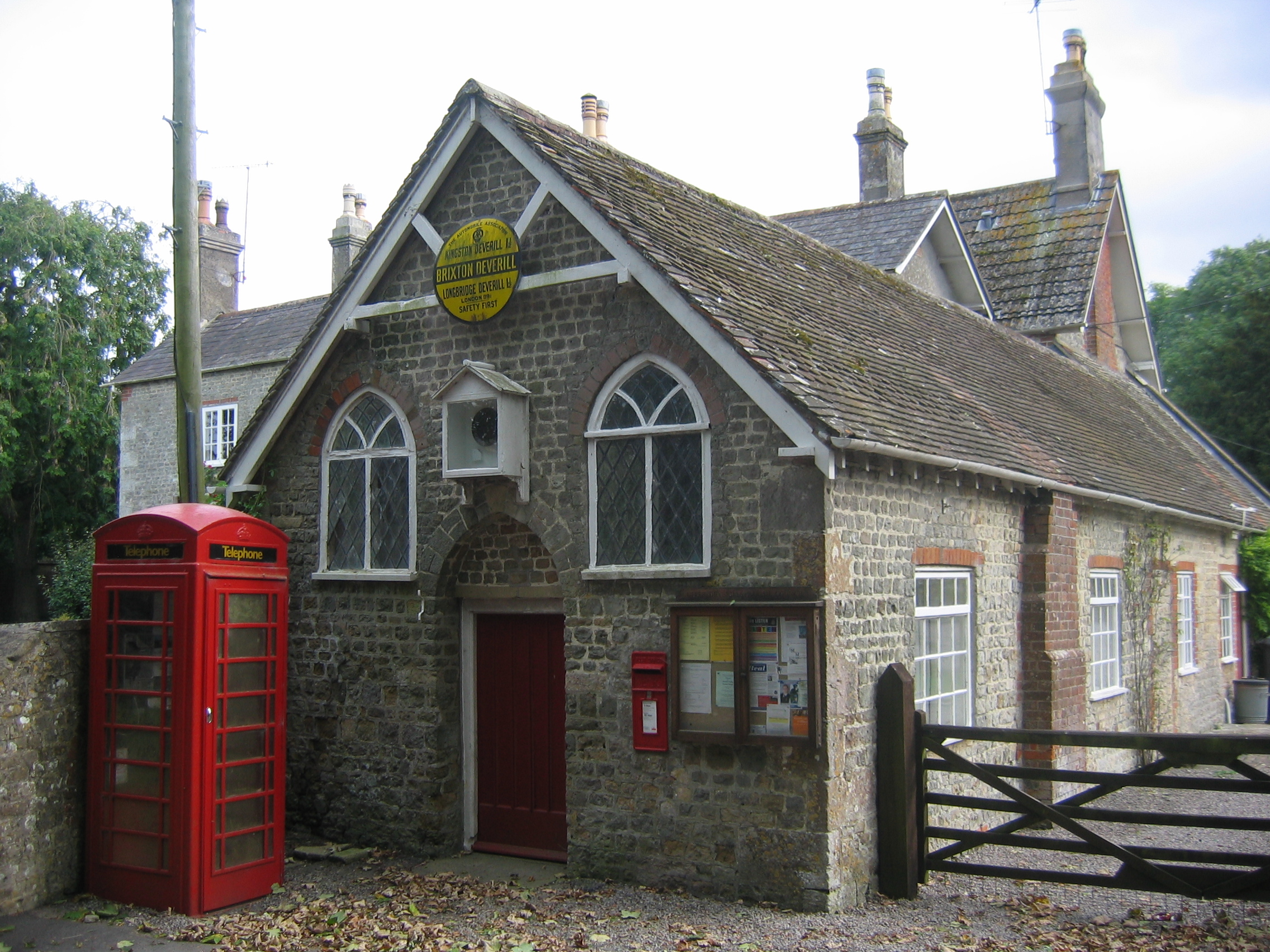
- Village hall

- Location within Wiltshire
- Population: 83 (in 2011)
- OS grid reference: ST863388
- Civil parish: Brixton Deverill
- Unitary authority: Wiltshire
- Ceremonial county: Wiltshire
- Region: South West
- Country: England
- Sovereign state: United Kingdom
- Post town: Warminster
- Postcode district: BA12
- Dialling code: 01985
- Police: Wiltshire
- Fire: Dorset and Wiltshire
- Ambulance: South Western
- UK Parliament: South West Wiltshire
- Website: Parish Council

Brixton Deverill is a small village and civil parish about 4 miles (6.4 km) south of Warminster in Wiltshire, England.

The parish is in the Deverill Valley which carries the upper waters of the River Wylye. The six villages of the valley – Kingston Deverill, Monkton Deverill, Brixton, Hill Deverill, Longbridge Deverill and Crockerton – are known as the Deverills.

== History ==
There was a Roman road on Pertwood Down, about 1.2 miles (2 km) south-east of the village. The remains of a large Roman villa were discovered during the laying of a cable in a garden in the village in 2015. Subsequent excavations by archaeologists from Historic England and The Salisbury Museum found a mosaic floor from the mid-4th century, belonging to a grand villa arranged around three sides of a courtyard. A Roman stone coffin, suitable for a child, which was being used as a plant pot, was also found.

In 1086, Domesday Book recorded a settlement called Devrel with 25 households, a church and a mill, on land held by the Abbey of Bec-Hellouin, Normandy. The lord in 1068 had been the Saxon Brictric, resulting in the 'Brixton' prefix to the placename. The abbey lost control of the estate during the wars with France, and in the 1440s Brixton was granted to King's College, Cambridge, who held it until 1941.

The Manor, immediately north of the church, has a 15th-century house at its core and was much enlarged in the 17th and 18th centuries; a 15th-century stone exterior doorway is now internal. The south-east block has an 18th-century staircase described as "good" by Julian Orbach.

17th-century buildings include (south of the village) George's Barn, a pair of semi-detached cottages extended on both sides in the 18th century, all with thatched roofs.

The population of the parish peaked in the 1860s and 1870s, standing at 227 at the 1871 census, then fell sharply to 69 in 1901. The next century saw only a small increase, reaching 83 in 2011.

== Local government ==
Brixton Deverill parish includes the small isolated settlement of Lower Pertwood. It elects members to a parish council called Upper Deverills, shared with the neighbouring parish of Kingston Deverill. The two parishes fall within the area of the Wiltshire Council unitary authority, which is responsible for all significant local government functions.

== Parish church ==
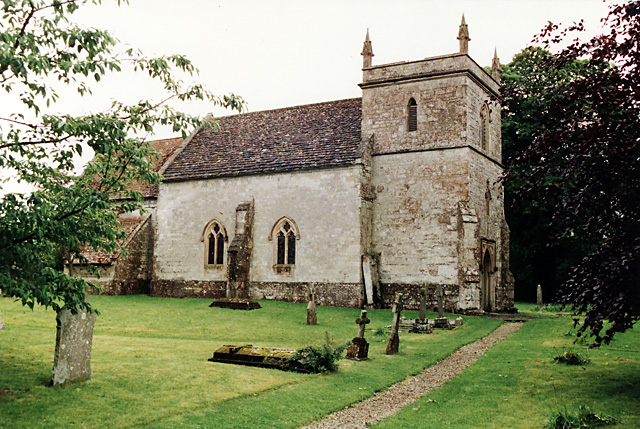
Brixton Deverill church in 1990

The parish church of St Michael the Archangel dates from the 13th century. The nave was rebuilt in 1760, and the plaster ceiling is part of that work. In 1862 the chancel was extended by the London-based architect William White, and the windows were renewed; stained glass in the east window and two others is by Wailes.

The church, which is built in dressed limestone, was designated as Grade II* listed in 1968. While the listing gives the low west tower as 15th-century, Julian Orbach, in his update of Nikolaus Pevsner's description, places its construction in the 13th century and notes its resemblance to the tower at Monkton Deverill. He further observes that the tower's details are from 1852 when a spire, since removed, was added.

The stone font has a 12th-century bowl with chevron carving, but the base and the lower part of the shaft are later; the font was brought from St Giles, Imber, in 1951, after that village was evacuated for military use in 1943. In the tower is a bell cast at the Salisbury foundry c.1400. On the north wall are two 17th-century Flemish carved panels depicting Adam and Eve, transferred from the 1880 pulpit of Monkton Deverill church (now a redundant church). Monuments include an urn described as "elegant" by Orbach, made by Thomas Paty in memory of Rev. John Rogers, who was rector of Brixton Deverill and vicar of Warminster from the 1740s until his death in 1773.

From December 1954 the benefice was held in plurality with that of Kingston Deverill. In 1972 the parish of The Deverills and Horningsham was formed by uniting the parishes of Brixton Deverill, Kingston Deverill with Monkton Deverill, and Longbridge Deverill with Crockerton and Hill Deverill. Today the parish is part of the Cley Hill Churches benefice.

=== Notable rectors ===
Two rectors of Brixton Deverill were simultaneously Archdeacon of Wilts: Thomas Henchman (rector 1662–1669, archdeacon from 1663 until his death in 1674); and Arthur Coham (archdeacon from 1779, rector from 1781, both until his death in 1799).
