= Ebsbury =

Iron Age site in Wiltshire, England

- Grovely Earthworks
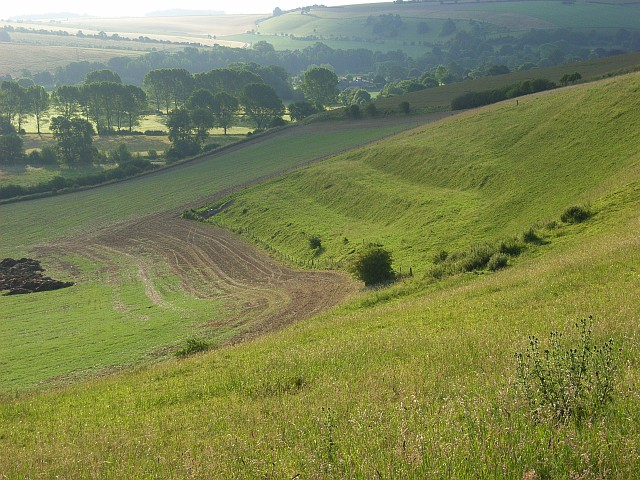
- The northern flank of Ebsbury Hill, with strip lynchets visible

- Location within Wiltshire
- 51.118°N 1.912°W
- Type: possible hill fort
- Periods: Iron Age
- Location: Wiltshire
- Region: Southern England

Site notes
- Excavation dates: 1906
- Archaeologists: SW Doughty

The site of Ebsbury, in Wiltshire, England, includes the remains of an Iron Age enclosed settlement, field system and possible hill fort, and a Romano-British enclosed settlement.

The site occupies the spur of a downland hill with the possible hill fort enclosure measuring approximately 700 m (770 yd) by 400 m (440 yd), inside of which lie the remains of a field system with two further smaller oval enclosures and one triangular enclosure. To the north and east sides of the site the contours of the hill have been reinforced by several banks. The site of an Iron Age settlement lies to the eastern end of the site.

The site was subject to archaeological surveys and excavations in 1906 by S.W. Doughty. Finds include a Neolithic perforated mace-head and two Roman coin hoards. The latter were found buried in two earthenware pots; the coins date from between AD 337 and AD 408, and were found with the remains of a glass vessel, and six silver rings.

== Location ==
The site is at grid reference SU061354, in the north of Barford St Martin parish. About 1 mile (1.6 km) to the west, in the River Wylye valley, lies the village of Great Wishford. The hill has a summit of 175 m (574 ft) AOD. Nearby to the north lies the Iron Age site called Grovely Castle, and to the south, the largest forest in Wiltshire, Grovely Wood.

== See also ==
- List of hill forts in England
