= Grovely Castle =

Iron Age hillfort in Wiltshire, England

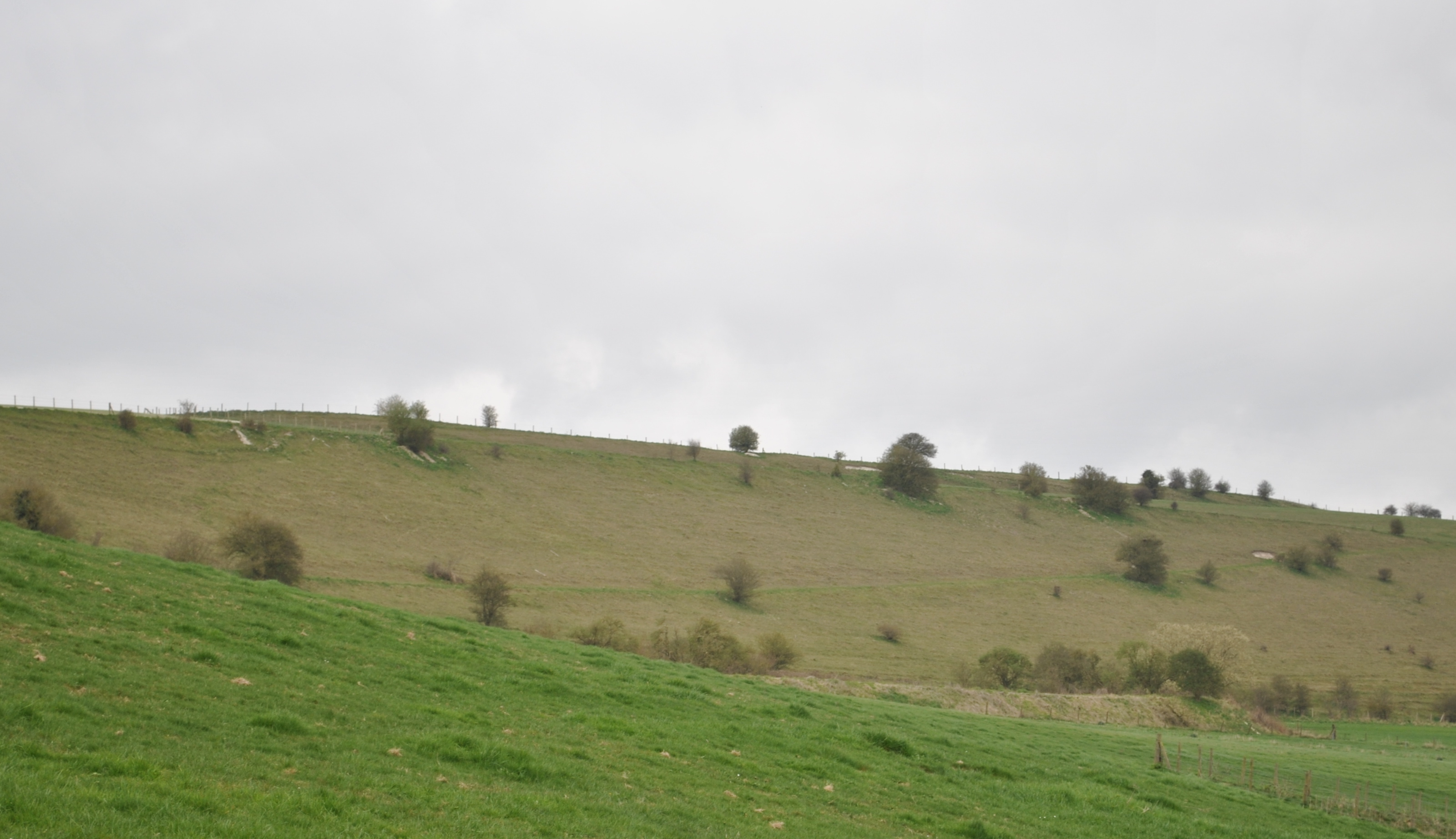

- Location within Wiltshire
- 51.1211°N 1.932°W
- Type: possible hill fort
- Periods: Iron Age
- Location: Wiltshire
- Region: Southern England

Site notes
- Area: 13 acres (5.3 ha)
- Archaeologists: P. F. Ewence, Grinsell

Grovely Castle is the site of an Iron Age univallate hill fort in the parish of Steeple Langford, in Wiltshire, England. The remaining ramparts stand approximately 3.2 m (10 ft) high, with 1.5 m (4.9 ft) deep ditches, although ploughing has damaged the earthworks in some parts of the site. Excavations have uncovered the remains of five human skeletons within the ramparts. Entrances are in the south-west and north-east corners of the hillfort. A circular enclosure of 35 to 40 m (115 to 131 ft) is evident in aerial photographs of the hillfort interior. There is also a later bank and ditch which runs through the hill-fort from south-west to north-east, and is probably part of an extensive surrounding Celtic field system.

== Location ==
The site is at grid reference SU048357, to the south of the village of Little Langford. The site has a summit of 156 m (512 ft) AOD. Nearby to the east lies the Iron Age site of Ebsbury, and to the south, the largest forest in Wiltshire, Grovely Wood.

== See also ==
- List of hillforts in England
