= Starveall and Stony Down =

Site of Special Scientific Interest in Wiltshire, England

Coordinates: 51.1593°N 2.0142°W

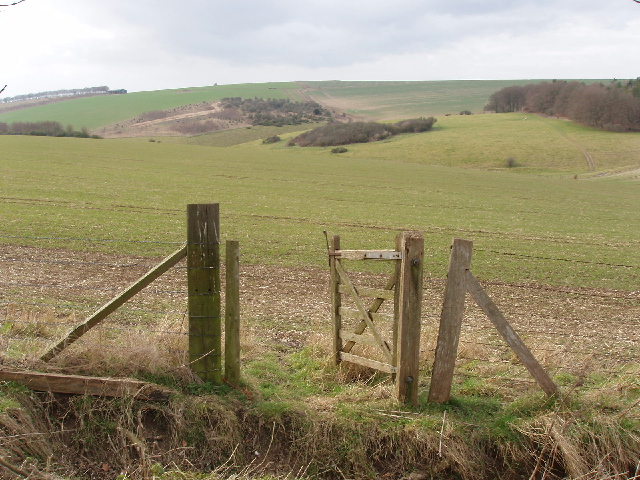
Gate on Stony Hill

Starveall and Stony Down is a 22.5 hectare biological Site of Special Scientific Interest in the parishes of Codford and Wylye, Wiltshire, England, notified in 1971.

== Sources ==
- Natural England citation sheet for the site (accessed 25 May 2023)
