= Old Sarum Way =

Footpath in Wiltshire, England

Coordinates: 51.067°N 1.798°W

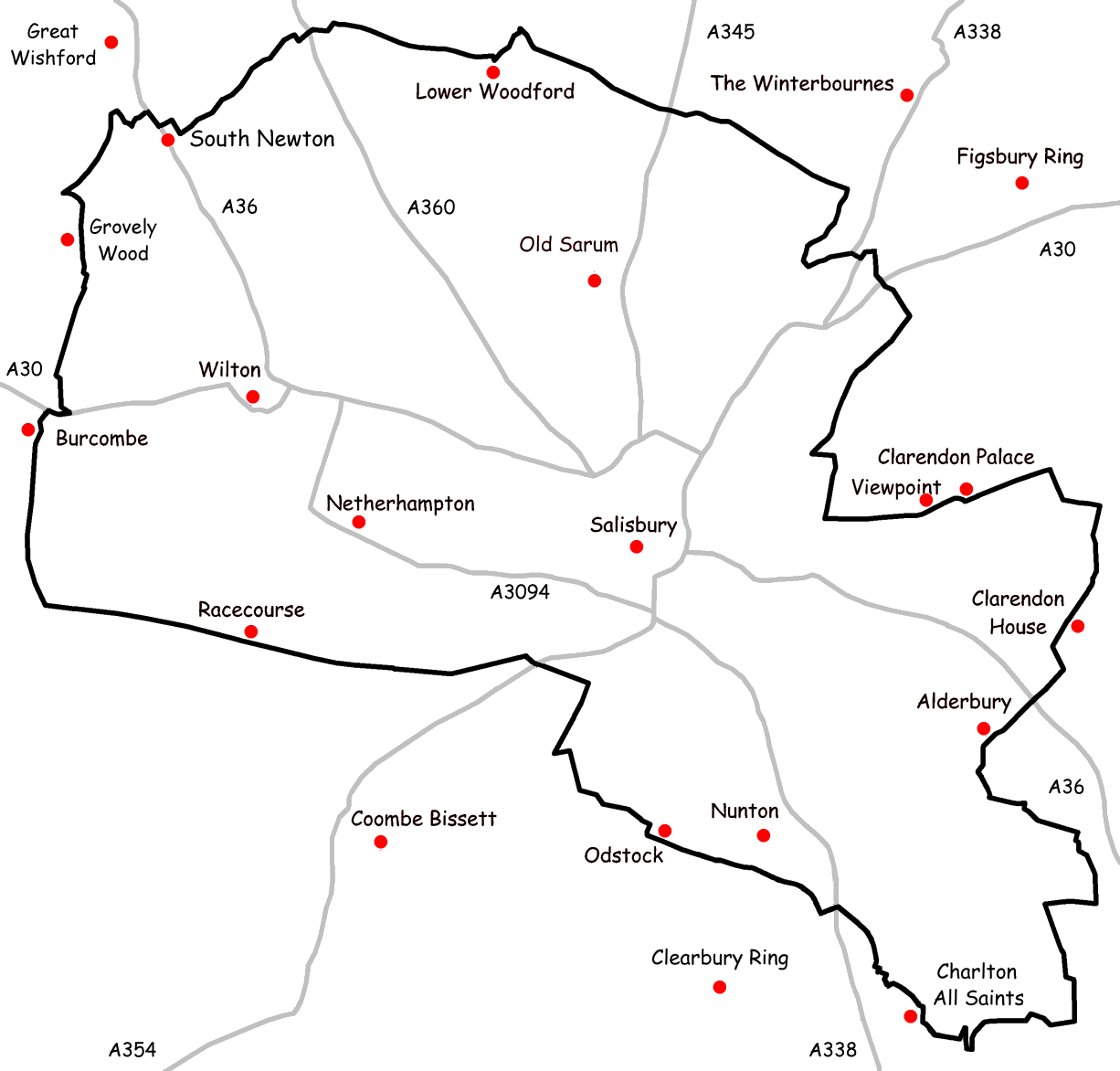
Trail and major roads

Old Sarum Way is a 32-mile (51 km) long-distance footpath in Wiltshire, England that forms a circle around the city of Salisbury.

The route uses public roads, public rights of way and some newly created permitted paths. Some sections of the footpath are waymarked by a metal plate attached to wooden posts which show a picture of the cathedral spire.

This is the best guess of the route (clockwise) based on surviving waymarks:

- SU074337 Head down the hill on the footpath, under the railway line then across the river into South Newton.
- SU088344 Climb the hill, passing the communication tower and crossing the A360.
- SU124353 Join the Monarch's Way.
- SU167337 Turn south.
- SU162329 Turn east into Old Malthouse Lane.
- SU170330 Turn south onto the bridleway; the path crosses the A30 and passes south on the hill above Laverstock.
- SU160297 Join the Clarendon Way.
- SU185302 Follow the footpath then the permissive path though the Clarendon Estate.
- SU193280 Turn south and follow Clarendon Lane then Folly Lane.
- SU183268 Turn onto the bridleway and pass south of Whaddon to SU195261. Turn south following approximately the disused railway line.
- SU194238 Turn west then join Witherington Road.
- SU189239 Turn onto the footpath through the woods and cross the river.
- SU176238 Join the Avon Valley Path northwards.
- SU129282 Turn left and head towards Salisbury Racecourse.

The waymarks for the western section are missing. The most likely route is that the path crosses the A30 between Wilton and Burcombe, then heads north into Grovely Wood.

== See also ==
- Long-distance footpaths in the UK
