= Thomas Henchman =

Thomas Henchman, D.D. (1642–1674) was an Anglican priest and the Archdeacon of Wilts from 1 August 1663 until his death.

Henchman was educated at Clare College, Cambridge from 1636, proceeding to B.A. 1640–1641 and D.D. 1666. He was ordained deacon on 5 June 1642. He held livings at Great Harrowden, Northamptonshire (1648); St George Botolph Lane in the City of London (to 1661); Brixton Deverill, Wiltshire (1662); and Much Hadham, Hertfordshire (1669).

He was a nephew of Humphrey Henchman (1592–1675), a Royalist who was bishop of Salisbury and then London. Thomas Henchman died on 15 December 1674.
