= Steeple Langford =

Village in Wiltshire, England

Coordinates: 51.136°N 01.947°W

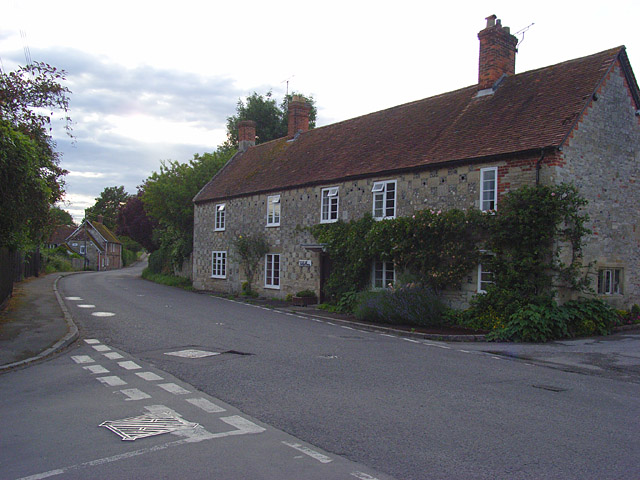
- Salisbury Road

- Location within Wiltshire
- Population: 515 (in 2011)
- OS grid reference: SU038374
- Unitary authority: Wiltshire
- Ceremonial county: Wiltshire
- Region: South West
- Country: England
- Sovereign state: United Kingdom
- Post town: Salisbury
- Postcode district: SP3
- Dialling code: 01722
- Police: Wiltshire
- Fire: Dorset and Wiltshire
- Ambulance: South Western
- UK Parliament: Salisbury
- Website: Parish Council

Steeple Langford is a village and civil parish in the English county of Wiltshire, 6 miles (10 km) northwest of Wilton. It has also been called Great Langford or Langford Magna. The village lies on the north bank of the River Wylye, and is bypassed to the north by the A36 Warminster-Salisbury trunk road which follows the river valley.

The parish includes two hamlets on the other side of the river: Hanging Langford and Little Langford (formerly a separate civil parish). To the west is the former settlement of Bathampton.

Steeple Langford has thatched cottages, and several lakes created by the flooding of worked-out gravel pits.

== Name ==
There is little doubt that the element 'Langford' refers to a ford over the River Wylye, around which the village grew up. The name 'Steeple Langford' has generally predominated over the alternative of 'Great Langford', and it has long been presumed (for instance, by William Cobbett) that the first element of this name refers to an architectural steeple. However, early forms of the name include 'Stapel', 'Steppul', and 'Staple' Langford, and one writer on the origin of the place-name has suggested that

"the prefix Staple sometimes indicates that to a town was granted the privilege of holding a market. Probably a stapol or pole may have been set up to show this to all who passed through. Or the ford may have been protected by stakes".

== History ==
Steeple Langford has a rich archaeological history. The Iron Age hillfort known as Yarnbury Castle is in the far north of the parish, and another known as Grovely Castle lies to the south of Little Langford.

Neolithic finds in the parish include flint tools, a polished axehead and pottery, as well as a bowl barrow and the remains of a round barrow; from the Bronze Age axeheads, a palstave and a chisel; from the Iron Age pottery, a rotary quern fragment and a circular enclosure; from the Romano-British period coins, a polished and painted pebble, and a needle; from the Saxon period a spearhead and a silver brooch; medieval strip lynchets; and field systems and earthworks of various dates. At Hanging Langford Camp, in the southwest of the parish, a Mesolithic flint axe and Romano-British brooches have been found.

The Domesday Book records that:

Waleran himself holds Langford. Osulf held it in the time of King Edward, and it paid geld for 10 hides. The land is 5 carucates. Of this there are 5 hides in demesne, and there are 2 carucates and 5 serfs; and there are 8 villans, and 4 bordars with 3 carucates. There is a mill paying 15 shillings, and 30 acres of meadow. The pasture is half a mile long and 2 furlongs broad. It was, and is, worth £10.

Sir Lawrence St Martin, a descendant of Waleran, died c 1320 in possession of 'Stupel Langford'.

In the time of King Edward III, John de Steeves held Steeple Langford in return for a knight's service.

As result of the Penruddock uprising of 1655, three men of the parish, Nicholas Mussell, yeoman, and Henry Collyer and Joseph Collier, gentlemen, were found guilty of high treason against Oliver Cromwell.

Arthur Collier, a metaphysician, a native of the parish and rector from 1704 to 1732, is notable for his Clavis Universalis (1713).

As a child of about ten in the 1770s, William Cobbett spent a whole summer in the village, and his happy memories of his stay led him to take one of his 'Rural Rides' into Wiltshire some fifty years later. However, he wrote in 1826 that

I remembered, very well, that the Women at Steeple Langford used to card and spin dyed wool... I have, I dare say, a thousand times talked about this Steeple Langford, and about the beautiful farms and meadows along this valley... When I got to Steeple Langford, I found no public-house, and I found it a much more miserable place than I had remembered it. The Steeple, to which it owed its distinctive appellation, was gone; and the place altogether seemed to me to be very much altered for the worse.

In June 1795, it was reported that some 120 sheep had been killed at Steeple Langford by a freak hailstorm.

The Salisbury to Westbury branch line was built across the parish, bisecting Little Langford and passing close to Hanging Langford. Langford station was opened at the same time as the line, in June 1856, but closed in October 1857.

The Warminster to Salisbury road running through Steeple Langford village was designated as the A36 in the 20th century, and became part of the Southampton-Bristol route. The road was rerouted close to the north of the village in 1989.

Little Langford parish, which had a population of 64 in 1931, was added to Steeple Langford in 1934. The population of the parish was 501 in 2001, much the same as in 1801, having peaked at 628 in 1861.

A detailed history of the parish is contained in Volume XV: Amesbury hundred and Branch and Dole hundred (1995) of A History of the County of Wiltshire.

=== Bathampton ===
Domesday Book recorded two estates under the name Wylye, which were later known as Batham Wylye; the name Bathampton came into use in the 15th century. Two groups of buildings in the west of the parish, each including a manor house, were known as Great Bathampton and Little Bathampton.

The former was the seat of the Mompesson family, who built Mompesson House in Salisbury Cathedral Close. They rebuilt the manor house in 1694 in rubble stone and dressed limestone, as a U-shaped building with a seven-bay front. Now called Bathampton House, it is Grade II* listed. Most of the interior is 18th-century, and in a drawing room is a fine white marble fireplace in late-18th Gothick style with elaborate carving, said to have come from Fonthill.

At the site of Little Bathampton, the late 17th-century farmhouse is known as Ballington Manor.

=== Hanging Langford ===
Hanging Langford is a street village, probably a planned layout, with houses on both sides of the street having rectangular plots of roughly equal size behind them. By 1066, the land had been divided into two equal estates.

From 1443 to 1914, Eton College owned land at Hanging Langford; another estate was owned by the Mompessons in the 15th and 16th centuries. The village has several 17th-century houses, including the Manor House, built in dressed limestone. A reading room was built c. 1913 and continues in use as the parish hall.

== Religious sites ==
=== Parish church ===
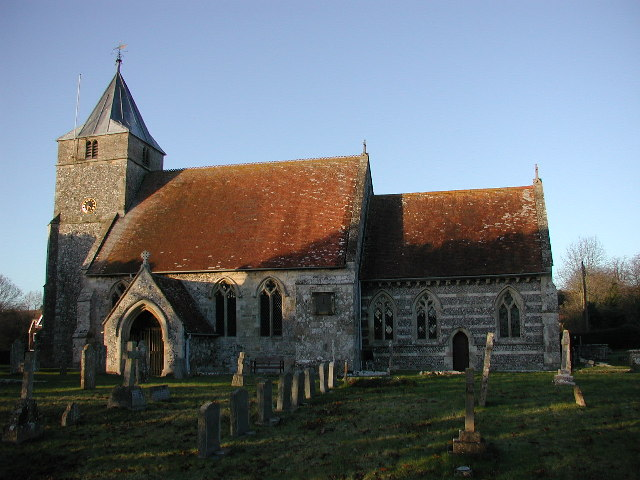
All Saints Church, Steeple Langford

The Church of England parish church of All Saints, in limestone and flint with a short lead-covered spire on its west tower, is a Grade I listed building.

The east wall may survive from 12th-century building, and the tower arch is 13th-century, but the church was substantially rebuilt in the 14th century. The top stage of the tower was added in the 15th century; in 1857 the chancel was rebuilt in 1857 by William Slater using coursed flint, and extensive restoration in 1875 by R. H. Carpenter included re-roofing and addition of a vestry. The square Purbeck marble font, on a modern plinth, is probably from the first half of the 13th century. Two of the six bells were cast in 1656.

A carved medieval roof boss in the north aisle of the church represents a dog, its body coiled and surrounded by foliage.

In 1857, when the chancel of the church was demolished for rebuilding, a slab of Purbeck marble was found, about 26 inches by 14, bearing an incised portrait of a man wearing a long robe, his hands raised to hold a plain shield or receptacle, with a horn hanging on a strap from his left shoulder. This was tentatively identified as Waleran Venator (Waleran the Huntsman), who held land in the parish and was patron of the living in the 11th century, which was the approximate date of the chancel. However, since the costume is of a later date, Alan de Langford, Verderer of Grovely Wood at the end of the 13th century, has also been suggested.

John Murray noted in 1859 that the church "contains a rich altar-tomb to one of the family of Mompesson, but it has long lost the steeple which formerly distinguished it".

In 1973, Steeple Langford parish was united with Little Langford, and became part of a new benefice of Wylye, Fisherton Delamere and The Langfords. Later the parish was extended under the name Middle Wylye Valley, and today the church, alongside nine others, is part of the Wylye and Till Valley benefice. The parish registers now held in the Wiltshire and Swindon History Centre cover the years 1674–1924 (christenings), 1674–1980 (marriages), and 1674–1873 (burials).

=== Others ===
At Little Langford, the Church dedicated to St Nicholas of Mira is a 19th-century rebuilding of a 12th-century church; it is Grade II* listed.

Baptists built a small redbrick chapel in 1849 at Hanging Langford, which was attended by a total of 125 at three services on Census Sunday in 1851; it was closed in 1960.

== Education ==
Children of Steeple Langford attend the primary school at Codford (Wylye Valley Church of England Voluntary Aided Primary School) and secondary schools further afield.

A National School was built in 1861 and continued as a Church of England Aided school from 1954. Due to falling numbers, in 2005 the school merged with the Codford school, with teaching at both sites; the Steeple Langford site closed in 2010.

== Nature reserves ==
Three lakes created by gravel workings alongside the River Wylye have been turned into a wildlife reserve called the Langford Lakes Nature Reserve, under the ownership of the Wiltshire Wildlife Trust. The reserve has an area of fifty acres, and species include mallard, gadwall, tufted duck, common pochard, northern shoveller, Eurasian wigeon, kingfisher, great crested grebe, common tern, osprey, brown trout, greyling, otters, and water voles.

Steeple Langford Down is a Biological Site of Special Scientific Interest, as an area of chalk grassland.

== Notable people ==
- Arthur Collier (1680–1732), philosopher: born at the rectory, himself rector from 1704 until his death
- Charles Chubb, (1851–1924), ornithologist
- General Sir John Whiteley (1896–1970), British Army general, retired to Steeple Langford
