= Bapton =

Hamlet in Wiltshire, England

Coordinates: 51.142°N 02.014°W

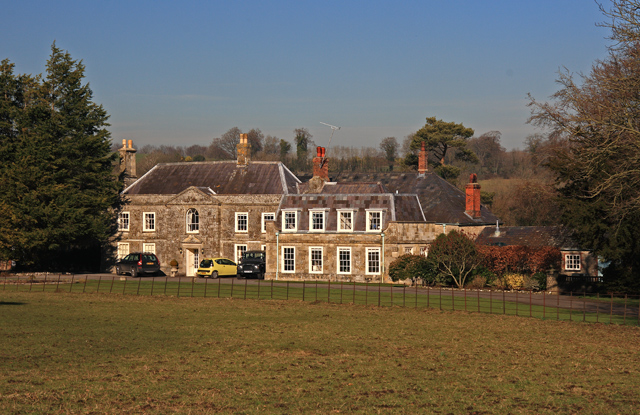
- Bapton Manor

- Location within Wiltshire
- OS grid reference: ST991381
- Civil parish: Stockton
- Unitary authority: Wiltshire
- Ceremonial county: Wiltshire
- Region: South West
- Country: England
- Sovereign state: United Kingdom
- Post town: Warminster
- Postcode district: BA12
- Dialling code: 01985
- Police: Wiltshire
- Fire: Dorset and Wiltshire
- Ambulance: South Western
- UK Parliament: South West Wiltshire

Bapton is a hamlet in Wiltshire, England, in the civil parish of Stockton. It lies south of the A36 and the River Wylye, on the minor road which follows the right bank of the Wylye, about 1 mile southeast of Stockton village and about 9 miles (14 km) southeast of Warminster.

Bapton, consisting of 1,174 acres, almost all owned as a single estate, was part of Fisherton Delamere parish from the earliest times until that parish was extinguished in 1934, when Bapton was transferred to Stockton. The estate was owned by Sir Cecil Chubb, the last private owner of Stonehenge, from 1927 until his death. In 1939 his heirs sold the property to Alfred Douglas-Hamilton, 13th Duke of Hamilton, who died in 1940.

Bapton Manor is a country house in dressed limestone. The five-bay front was built in the 1730s, while the east end may date from the 17th century.
