= Fisherton de la Mere =

Village in Wiltshire, England

Coordinates: 51.146°N 2.001°W

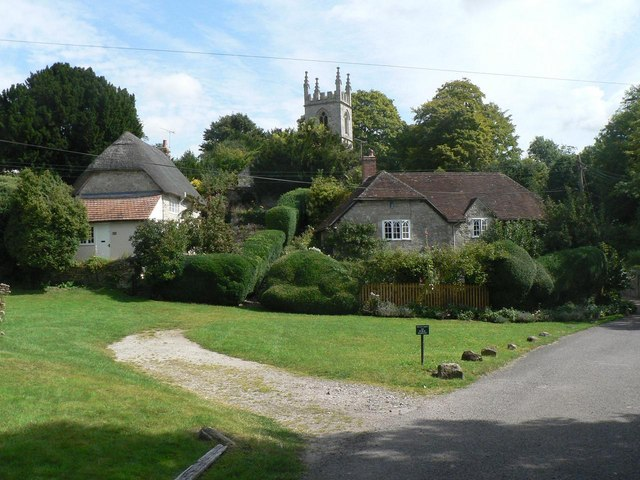
- Cottages and church, Fisherton de la Mere

- Location within Wiltshire
- OS grid reference: SU000385
- Civil parish: Wylye
- Unitary authority: Wiltshire
- Ceremonial county: Wiltshire
- Region: South West
- Country: England
- Sovereign state: United Kingdom
- Post town: Warminster
- Postcode district: BA12
- Dialling code: 01985
- Police: Wiltshire
- Fire: Dorset and Wiltshire
- Ambulance: South Western
- UK Parliament: Salisbury

Fisherton de la Mere, also spelt Fisherton Delamere, is a small village and former civil parish, now in the parish of Wylye, on the River Wylye, Wiltshire, England. The village lies just off the A36, midway between Salisbury and Warminster, each about 10 miles (16 km) distant. The parish came to an end in 1934 and was divided between Wylye and Stockton, the latter gaining the hamlet of Bapton while the village of Fisherton de la Mere retained a separate identity within Wylye. In 1931 the parish had a population of 195.

== History ==
In the Domesday Book of 1086, the settlement name is spelt Fisertone and there were 42 households and a mill. The estate was held by Roger de Corcelle, alongside Curry Mallet in Somerset.

The ancient parish of Fisherton de la Mere formed a detached part of the Warminster hundred of Wiltshire. It contained two villages, Fisherton itself, to the north of the River Wylye, and Bapton, about a mile away and to the south of the river, and covered 2,834 acres, of which 1,660 were in Fisherton. The civil parish was extinguished in 1934, when Fisherton was transferred to Wylye, and Bapton to Stockton.

The former parish was a rough oblong stretching both north and south up into the downland on each side of the river, each slope running down from an altitude of about 600 feet. At the south is a level area called the Bake. On the north-east the parish boundary ran along the old road from Chitterne to Stapleford, on the south along Grim's Dyke, an ancient earthwork, while on the south-west the boundary cut through a combe, Roakham Bottom.

A schoolroom was built in 1865 just west of the church, attached to an 18th-century cottage, and was later supported by the National Society. Attendance had dwindled to 15 by 1922, and the school was closed.

Almost the whole of the village was designated as a Conservation Area in 1975. A detailed parish history was published in 1965 by the Wiltshire Victoria County History.

=== Landowners ===
The name Delamere, Delamare, or de la Mere, refers to the family of Nunney Castle, Somerset, who owned the manor in the Middle Ages, and whose name was spelt in all of those ways. The last of the family was Sir John Delamare (c. 1320–1383).

When his niece and heiress Eleanor Delamare died in 1413, Fisherton passed into the Paulet family and thus to the William Paulet who was Lord Chamberlain and Secretary of State to Henry VIII, and Lord High Treasurer to Edward VI, Lady Jane Grey, Mary I, and Elizabeth I. Fisherton continued to belong to the Paulets as Dukes of Bolton. The Fisherton estate was owned by the Dukes of Somerset in the late 18th and early 19th centuries.

Bapton was owned by Sir Cecil Chubb from 1927, and he lived at Bapton Manor. In 1939 his heirs sold his estate to Alfred Douglas-Hamilton, 13th Duke of Hamilton, who died in 1940.

== Church ==
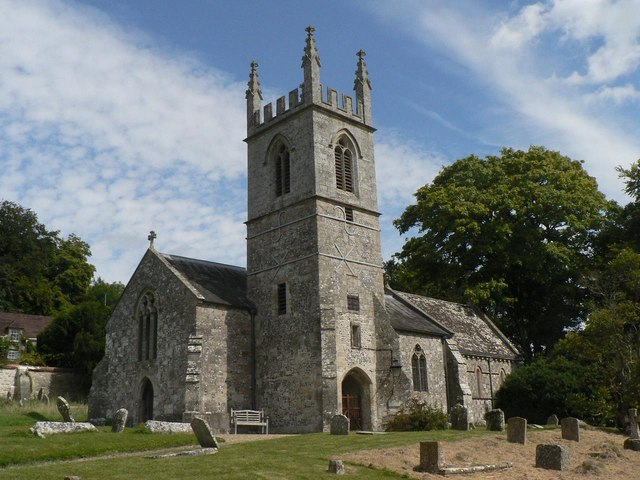
St Nicholas' Church

The Church of England parish church, St Nicholas's Church, built in the 14th century in a chequerboard pattern of flint and Chilmark stone, stands on a hill overlooking the River Wylye at the centre of the village. It is now a Grade II* listed building in the care of the Churches Conservation Trust.

The parish registers survive in the Wiltshire and Swindon History Centre for the following dates: christenings 1561–1895, marriages 1566–1992, and burials 1569–1992.

== Governance ==
The 1817 landscape painting Sheepwashing by David Wilkie depicts the village

Almost all of the present village of Fisherton de la Mere is now part of the parish of Wylye. However, as the River Wylye is the parish boundary, Fisherton Mill (lying on the south of the river) is in Stockton. On 1 April 1934 the parish (called "Fisherton de la Mare" or Fisherton de la Mere) was abolished and merged with Wylye and Stockton.

The village comes under the Wylye parish council and is in the area of the Wiltshire Council unitary authority, which is responsible for almost all significant local government functions. It forms part of the South West Wiltshire Parliament constituency, and the serving Member of Parliament is Andrew Murrison.

== Notable people ==
- Sir Elias Delamere, of Fisherton Delamere, High Sheriff of Wiltshire in 1413
- William Paulet, later Lord Chamberlain, Secretary of State, Lord High Treasurer and first Marquess of Winchester, was probably born at Fisherton de la Mere
- Josephine Mary Newall (1853 - 1923) (who was the eldest child of the founder of British Columbia Major-General Richard Clement Moody and the wife of the eldest son of Robert Stirling Newall FRS FRAS) lived at Fisherton House, where she was a distinguished fabric embroiderer. Her eldest son Robert Stanley Newall FSA (1884 - 1987), who was an ethnographer of Aboriginal Australia and an archaeologist for the Commissioners of Woods and Forests who made excavations at Stonehenge, inherited Fisherton House.
- Granville Ryder, a former Member of Parliament for Salisbury, owned Fisherton De La Mere House from 1895 until his death in 1901.

== List of vicars ==
- William de Beloney: 1314
- John Conge: early 15th century
- Joel Doughty: 1596–1613
- Thomas Crockford: 1613–1634
- Edward Seymour: 1793
- William Davis: 1807
- Edward Graves Meyrick: 1813
- William Davison Thring DD: 1844
- Thomas John Davis: 1854–1868
- W. G. N. Fenwick: 1868–1883
- Thomas Ratcliffe:1885–1893
- Raymond Williams: 1897
