= Steeple Langford Down =

Biological Site of Special Scientific Interest

Coordinates: 51.14755°N 1.94991°W

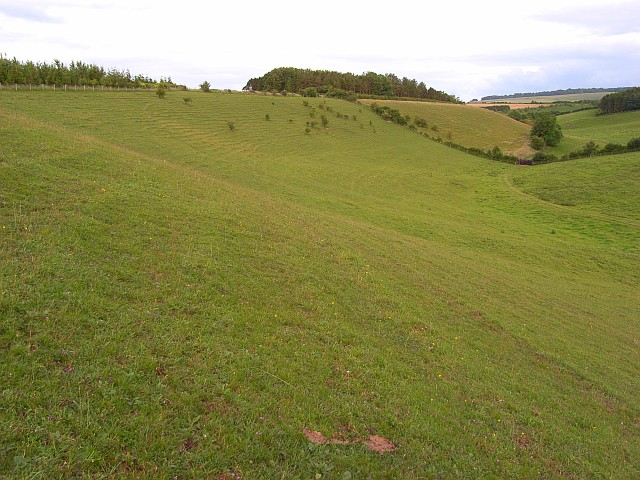
Steeple Langford Down

Steeple Langford Down (grid reference SU036387) is a 21.75 hectare biological Site of Special Scientific Interest at Steeple Langford in Wiltshire, notified in 1971.

== Sources ==
- Natural England citation sheet for the site (accessed 25 May 2023)
