= Little Langford =

Hamlet in Wiltshire, England

Coordinates: 51.129°N 1.930°W

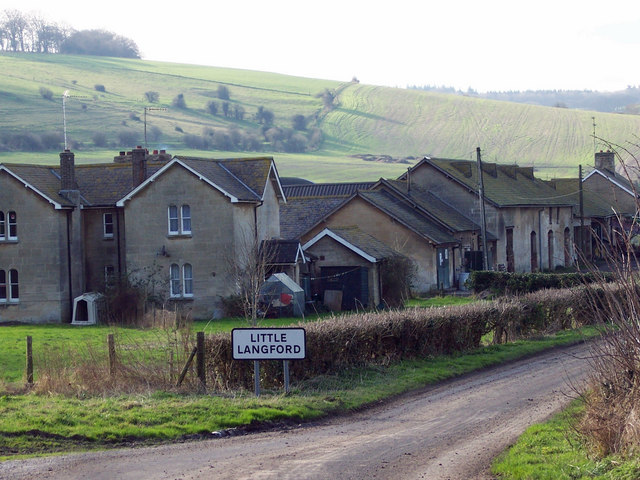
- Part of Little Langford Farm

- Location within Wiltshire
- OS grid reference: SU050366
- Civil parish: Steeple Langford
- Unitary authority: Wiltshire
- Ceremonial county: Wiltshire
- Region: South West
- Country: England
- Sovereign state: United Kingdom
- Post town: SALISBURY
- Postcode district: SP3
- Dialling code: 01722
- Police: Wiltshire
- Fire: Dorset and Wiltshire
- Ambulance: South Western
- UK Parliament: Salisbury

Little Langford is a hamlet and former civil parish, now in the parish of Steeple Langford, in Wiltshire, England. Its nearest town is Wilton, about 5 miles (8.0 km) to the southeast. It is in the Wylye valley, to the south of the river; the grass fields adjacent to the river were traditionally flood meadows. In 1931 the parish had a population of 64. On 1 April 1932 the parish was abolished and merged with Steeple Langford.

In 1086, the Domesday Book survey recorded estates held by Wilton Abbey, Glastonbury Abbey and Edward of Salisbury.

In 1990, the Wilton estate of the Earl of Pembroke owned nearly all the land in the former parish.

== Notable sights ==
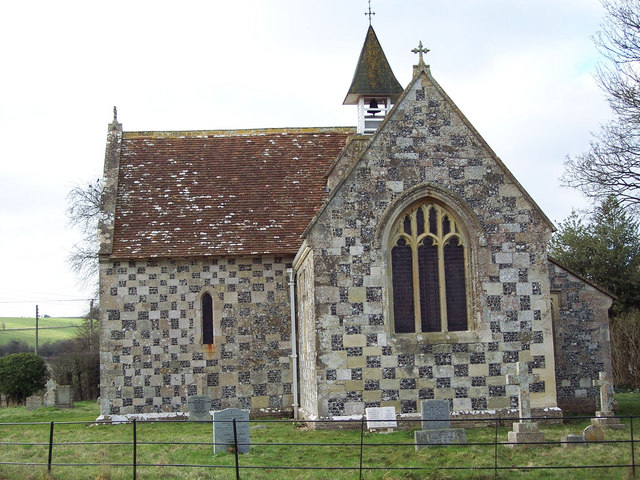
Church of St Nicholas of Mira

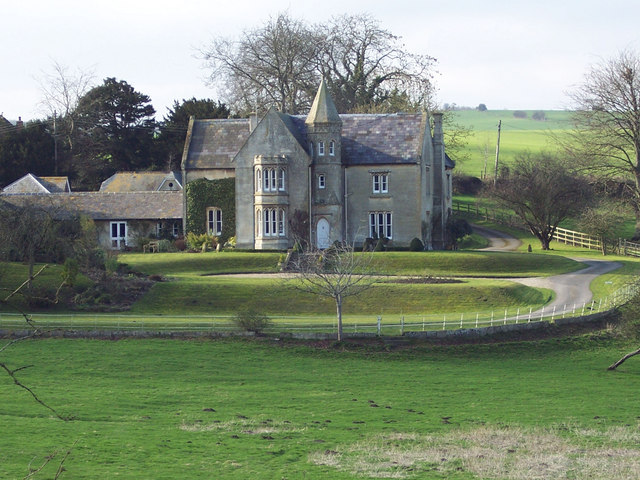
Little Langford Farm

The Anglican Church of St Nicholas of Mira is Grade II* listed. It dates from the 12th century and was rebuilt in 1864 by T. H. Wyatt, reusing a 12th-century doorway on the south side of the nave. Alexander Hyde, later Bishop of Salisbury, was rector from 1634.

Little Langford farmhouse (c. 1858) has a Victorian Gothic entrance tower, lancet windows, and crenellations.

Just to the south of the village lies the Iron Age hill-fort of Grovely Castle.
