= Monkton Deverill =

Village in Wiltshire, England

Coordinates: 51.135°N 2.207°W

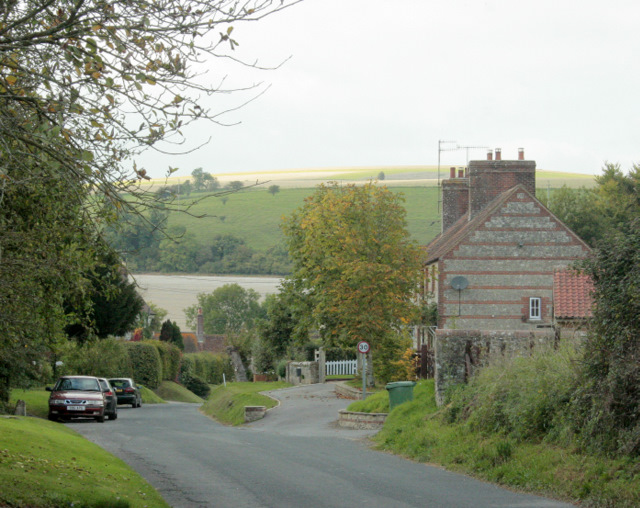
- Entering the village from the southeast

- Location within Wiltshire
- OS grid reference: ST855373
- Civil parish: Kingston Deverill
- Unitary authority: Wiltshire
- Ceremonial county: Wiltshire
- Region: South West
- Country: England
- Sovereign state: United Kingdom
- Post town: Warminster
- Postcode district: BA12
- Dialling code: 01985
- Police: Wiltshire
- Fire: Dorset and Wiltshire
- Ambulance: South Western
- UK Parliament: South West Wiltshire

Monkton Deverill (anciently known as East Monkton) is a village and former civil parish, now in the parish of Kingston Deverill, in Wiltshire, England, about five miles south of Warminster and four miles north-east of Mere. The area has been part of Kingston Deverill parish since 1934. It lies on the River Wylye and forms part of a group of villages known as the Upper Deverills. In 1931 the parish had a population of 108.

== History ==
Two Roman roads intersect close to the village. In 1989–1990, archaeologists investigated a 7th-century Anglo-Saxon cemetery in the parish and made a section through a Roman road.

Before the Dissolution of the Monasteries, Monkton Deverill was a manor of Glastonbury Abbey and was formerly known as East Monkton. In the Middle Ages, its church was a chapel of the church at Longbridge Deverill, also a Glastonbury manor.

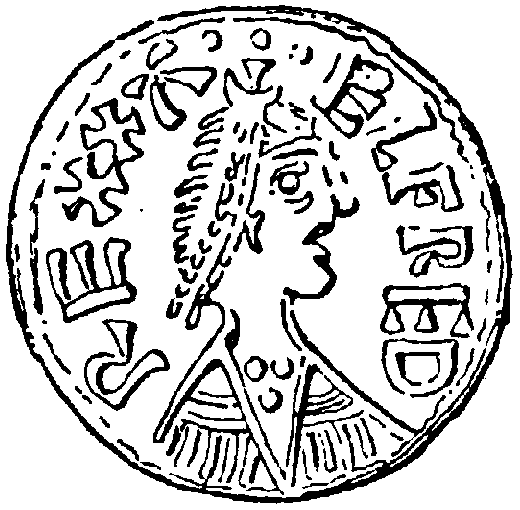
Coin of Alfred the Great, the saint to whom the parish church was dedicated

For almost forty years, beginning in the late 14th century, the bailiffs of Glastonbury Abbey's manors of Longbridge and Monkton Deverill, which were remote from the Abbey's own logistical systems, kept good accounts of their stewardship. These records survive and provide detailed information on the manors' agricultural and other business. They show that most of the grain produced on the land went to markets within ten miles, except in years when it was selling for higher prices. Most buyers of the manors' wool came from within a radius of twenty miles. However, some items, such as millstones, were brought from much farther away.

After the Dissolution, the manor was sold by the Crown to John Thynne together with Longbridge Deverill and thereafter descended in his family, who much later became Marquesses of Bath. The Thynnes have preserved many of Glastonbury Abbey's records at Longleat up to the present day.

The village has two farmhouses dating from the 17th century: Manor Farmhouse and Burton Farmhouse. The mid-18th-century house at number 85 on the village street bears a large panel displaying the Ludlow arms, said to have been moved from Hill Deverill manor house in 1737.

A small school was built near the church c. 1870 but had closed by 1895. Historic England describe the building (now a private house) as "a good example of a simple village school with Gothic and vernacular detail". The population of the parish was 204 in 1831, but is now lower.

A detailed parish history is in progress and will be published as part of volume XIX of A History of the County of Wiltshire.

== Parish church ==
The former Church of England parish church was dedicated to St Alfred the Great. Alfred had marched into the valley of the Deverills in 878, on his way to victory at the Battle of Ethandun.

In 1845, the church was demolished except for the tower, and rebuilt under the direction of Thomas Henry Wyatt. The tower is either late-13th-century (Nikolaus Pevsner) or 14th-century (Historic England).

The Gentleman's Magazine noted in January 1846:

November 25. [1845] The church of Monkton Deverill was re-opened for divine service, after having been closed for some time. The church was in a state of such extreme dilapidation, that scarcely could the parishioners meet together in safety from the dangerous condition of the aisles and roof. The Trustees of the Marquess of Bath, to whom the larger part of the parish belongs, have contributed 400l towards the repairs; and the occupiers cheerfully passed a church-rate of about 118l which nearly covered the remaining expenses. The old building was levelled to the ground, with the exception of the tower, and rebuilt from the designs of the diocesan architect, Thomas Wyatt, esq. It is built in the plain perpendicular style; the eastern window alone having any peculiar tracery. The roof is of open timber, stained to imitate oak. The sittings are open, with square stall heads. The eastern window is of stained glass, by Millar, and the gift of the rector, the Rev. Lord Charles Thynne.

The new church contained a fine pulpit, believed to be originally from Belgium, also presented in the mid 19th century by the Rev. Lord Charles Thynne, rector of the parish.

Monkton Deverill was anciently a chapelry of Longbridge Deverill, but was transferred to Kingston Deverill in 1892.

In 1928, Edward Hutton noted:

Kingston Deverill looks better than it is – Monkton Deverill, not a mile lower down the valley, has, however, even less to show. Of the church only the Perpendicular tower and the Norman font are old, though here again the pulpit panels representing scenes from the Old Testament are interesting.

The church was declared redundant in 1971 and has since been converted into a private house. The 12th-century stone font was transferred to St Peter's at Stourton. The parish registers are now held in the Wiltshire and Swindon History Centre and cover the periods 1695–1961 (baptisms), 1749–1958 (marriages), and 1740–1980 (burials).

== Governance ==
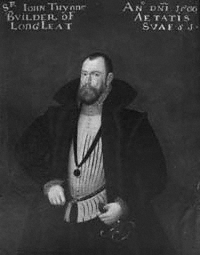
John Thynne bought the manor from the Crown

On 1 April 1934 the parish was abolished and merged with Kingston Deverill.

Almost all significant local government services are now provided by Wiltshire Council, a unitary authority created in 2009, which has its main offices in Trowbridge. The village is represented in parliament by Dr Andrew Murrison and in Wiltshire Council by Fleur de Rhé-Philipe, both Conservatives.

== Notable people ==
Meredith Frampton (1894–1984), painter and portrait artist, retired to Monkton Deverill. In 1938 he designed for himself a house called Hill Barn, on an isolated site on higher ground south of the village.
