= Upper Deverills =

Parish council in Wiltshire, England

- Unitary authority: Wiltshire
- Ceremonial county: Wiltshire
- Region: South West
- Country: England
- Sovereign state: United Kingdom
- Post town: WARMINSTER
- Postcode district: BA12
- Dialling code: 01985
- Police: Wiltshire
- Fire: Dorset and Wiltshire
- Ambulance: South Western
- UK Parliament: South West Wiltshire
- Website: Parish Council

Upper Deverills Parish Council is a grouped parish council in Wiltshire, England, which covers the civil parishes of Brixton Deverill and Kingston Deverill.

As of 2021, the parishes have altogether 280 electors. The Upper Deverills Parish Council has five members.

As well as the villages of Brixton Deverill and Kingston Deverill, the council covers two further settlements in Kingston Deverill parish, namely Monkton Deverill and Whitepits.

Most local government services are provided by Wiltshire Council, a unitary authority which has its offices in Trowbridge.
