= River Wylye =

River in Wiltshire, England

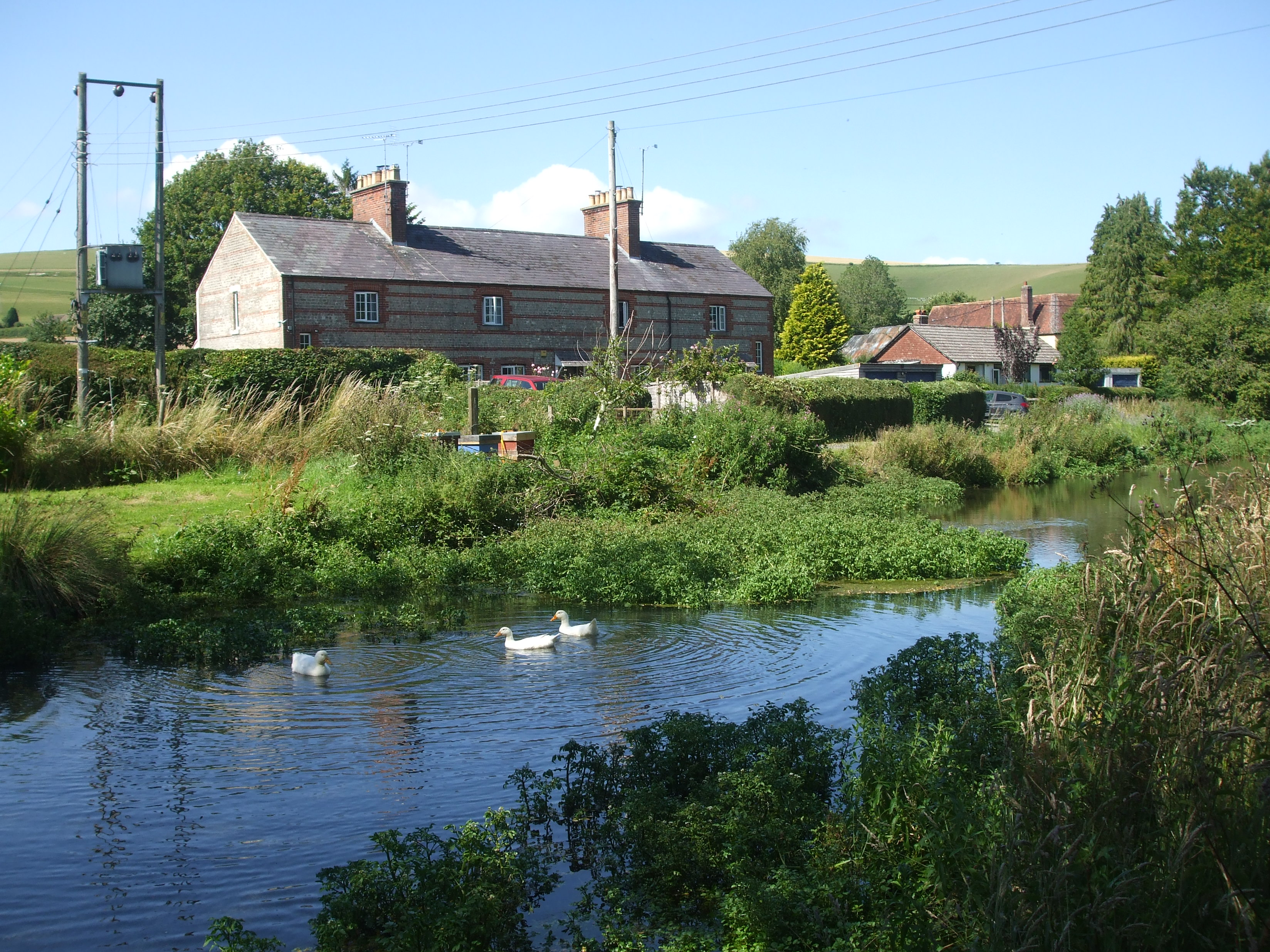
- The river at Kingston Deverill

Physical characteristics
- Source: Kilmington, Wiltshire, England
  - coordinates: 51°07′31″N 2°19′28″W
- Mouth: Confluence with River Nadder
  - location: Wilton, Wiltshire, England
  - coordinates: 51°04′36″N 1°50′40″W
- Length: 45 km (28 mi)
- Basin size: 470 km^{2} (180 sq mi)
- Discharge
  - location: Chitterne Brook
  - average: 0.3 m^{3}/s (11 cu ft/s)
  - minimum: 0.1 m^{3}/s (3.5 cu ft/s)
  - maximum: 0.6 m^{3}/s (21 cu ft/s)

Basin features
- Progression: Nadder, Avon, English Channel
- Tributaries
  - left: Chitterne Brook, River Till

The River Wylye (/ˈwaɪli/ WY-lee), also known in its upper reaches as the River Deverill, is a chalk stream in Wiltshire, England, with clear water flowing over gravel. It is popular with fly fishermen. A half-mile stretch of the river and three lakes in Warminster are a local nature reserve.

== Etymology ==
The name Wylye is of unclear origin but has been linked to the Brittonic word gwil, meaning "trick"; it would therefore mean "tricky one", either because of the river's winding course or because it was prone to sudden floods. The river gives its name to Wilton and hence to Wiltshire (originally Wiltonshire). The alternative name Deverill derives from the Brittonic root *duβr, meaning "water", and the adjectival suffix *-(i)ol.

== Course ==
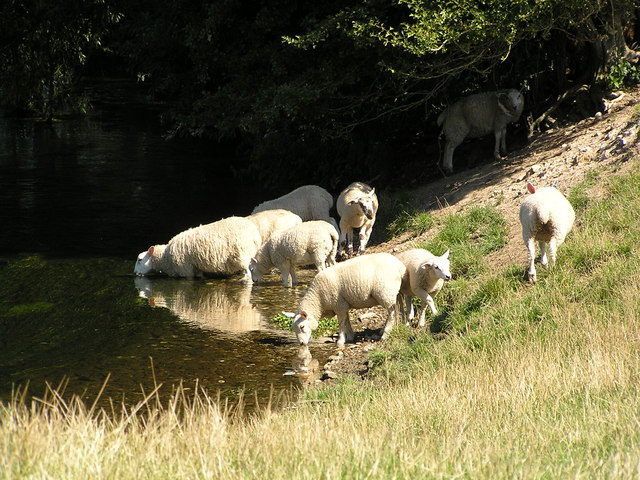
Sheep drinking from the river at Great Wishford

The Wylye rises at Kilmington in the southwestern corner of Wiltshire and then disappears underground, reappearing at Coombe Barn, west of Kingston Deverill. It then flows north through the Deverill Valley towards Warminster. From here it turns southeast to flow through the Wylye Valley, which skirts the southern edge of Salisbury Plain. At Wilton, the Wylye empties into the Nadder, which itself empties into the Avon at Salisbury. The Avon eventually drains into the English Channel at Christchurch.

The Wylye is fed by several winterbournes, which commonly dry up completely in the summer, so that the water flow in the river can vary greatly according to the time of year.

== Features ==
Two SSSIs are associated with the river: Steeple Langford Down and Wylye and Church Dean Downs. The Wylye Valley Vineyard is at Crockerton, near the river's source.

== Water quality ==
The Environment Agency measures the water quality of the river systems in England. Each is given an overall ecological status, which may be one of five levels: high, good, moderate, poor and bad. There are several components that are used to determine this, including biological status, which looks at the quantity and varieties of invertebrates, angiosperms and fish. Chemical status, which compares the concentrations of various chemicals against known safe concentrations, is rated good or fail.

Water quality of the Wylye in 2019:

| Section | Ecological Status | Chemical Status | Overall Status | Length | Catchment | Channel |
|---|---|---|---|---|---|---|
| Wylye (Headwaters) | Poor | Fail | Poor | 19.035 km (11.828 mi) | 87.746 km^{2} (33.879 sq mi) | |
| Wylye (Middle) | Moderate | Fail | Moderate | 40.013 km (24.863 mi) | 122.421 km^{2} (47.267 sq mi) | |
| Wylye (Lower) | Good | Fail | Moderate | 15.775 km (9.802 mi) | 21.74 km^{2} (8.39 sq mi) | |

== Villages ==
Villages on or near the Wylye include (source to confluence):

- Kilmington
- Kingston Deverill
- Monkton Deverill
- Brixton Deverill
- Longbridge Deverill
- Crockerton
- Norton Bavant
- Heytesbury
- Sutton Veny
- Upton Lovell
- Boyton
- Sherrington
- Codford
- Stockton
- Bapton
- Fisherton Delamere
- Wylye
- Hanging Langford
- Steeple Langford
- Great Wishford
- Stoford
- South Newton
- Wilton
