= Sebastian Benefield =

English clergyman & academic (1559–1630)

Sebastian Benefield (1559–1630) was an English clergyman and academic.

== Life ==
He was a native of Prestbury, Gloucestershire, where he was born on 12 August 1559. He was admitted scholar of Corpus Christi College, Oxford, on 30 August 1586. He is found probationer-fellow of the same college 16 April 1590. Shortly afterwards he took his degrees of B.A. and M.A., and, obtaining licence with holy orders, soon came to be known as a preacher. In 1599 he was appointed rhetoric reader of his college, and m 1600 was admitted as reader of the sentences. In 1608 he proceeded D.D. In 1613 he was chosen Margaret professor of divinity in the university. He resigned his professorship in 1614 and retired to the rectory of Meysey-Hampton. He died in his parsonage-house 24 August 1630, and was buried in the chancel of his church the 29th of the same month.

== Works ==
- 'Doctrinae Christianae sex Capita totidem Praelectionibus in Schola Theologica Oxoniensi pro forma habitis discussa et disceptata,' 1610. An appendix entitled 'Appendix ad Caput secundum de Consiliis Evangelicis . . . adversus Humphredum Leach,' argues against his antagonist.
- 'Eight Sermons publicly preached in the University of Oxford, the second at St. Peter's in-the-East, the rest at St. Mary's church. Began 14 Dec. 1595,' 1614.
- 'The Sin against the Holy Ghost discovered, and other Christian Doctrines delivered in Twelve Sermons upon part of the Tenth Chapter of the Epistle to the Hebrews,' 1615.
- Commentary on the minor prophet Amos (1613, 1620, 1629). It is somewhat scholastic and dry, but suggestive and practical. The commentary was translated into Latin by Henry Jackson (Oppenheim, 1615), who ultimately succeeded him at Meysey-Hampton.
- 'Praelectiones de Perseverantia Sanctorum' (Frankfort, 1618), a Calvinist work.
