= Henry Jackson =

Henry Jackson may refer to:

== Military ==
- Henry Jackson (Continental Army general) (1747–1809), American colonial leader
- Henry R. Jackson (1820–1898), American Civil War general
- Henry Jackson (Royal Navy officer) (1855–1929), British First Sea Lord
- Henry Jackson (British Army officer) (1879–1972), British Army General
- USS Henry M. Jackson, missile submarine

== Politics ==
- Henry Jackson (Minnesota pioneer) (1811–1857), American pioneer and legislator
- Henry Jackson (surveyor) (1830–1906), New Zealand politician and surveyor
- Sir Henry Jackson, 2nd Baronet (1831–1881), British MP for Coventry
- Henry Jackson (colonial administrator) (1849–1908), British colonial administrator
- Sir Henry Jackson, 1st Baronet (1875–1937), British Conservative MP for Wandsworth Central
- Henry M. Jackson (1912–1983), known as Scoop, American politician
  - Henry Jackson Society, British conservative think tank

== Sports ==
- Henry Jackson (football manager) (c. 1850–1930), English football secretary-manager and director
- Henry Jackson (baseball) (1861–1932), Major League Baseball player
- Henry Jackson (Australian footballer) (1877–1964), Australian rules footballer
- Henry Jackson (triple jumper) (born 1947), Jamaican long and triple jumper
- Henry Jackson (long jumper, born 1948), American long jumper for the Western Kentucky Hilltoppers and Lady Toppers track and field team
- Henry Jackson (rugby union), Irish international rugby union player
- Henry Melody Jackson Jr. aka Henry Armstrong (1912–1988), American boxer

== Other ==
- Henry Jackson (priest) (1586–1662), English priest and literary editor
- Henry Melville Jackson (1840–1900), assistant bishop of the Episcopal Diocese of Alabama
- Henry Jackson (classicist) (1839–1921), English classicist
- Henry L. Jackson (died 1948), American businessman, editor, and journalist
- Henry Jackson (businessman) (born 1964)
- Henry Jackson (1956–2014), rapper Big Bank Hank

== See also ==
- Harry Jackson (disambiguation)
- Sir Henry Mather-Jackson, 3rd Baronet (1855–1942), Lord Lieutenant of Monmouthshire
