= Vale of White Horse Hunt =

Fox hunting pack

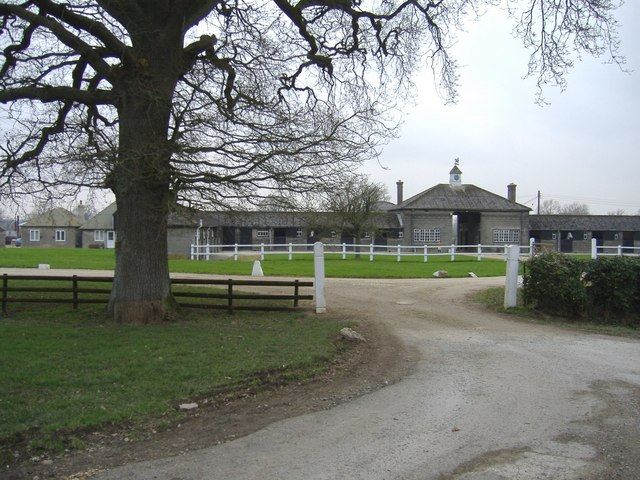
Kennels at Meysey Hampton, Gloucestershire. Built in the 1930s for V.W.H (Cricklade) and still in use today by the re-amalgamated hunt.

The Vale of the White Horse Hunt (or V.W.H.) is a fox hunting pack that was formed in 1832. It takes its name from the neighbouring Vale of White Horse district, which includes a Bronze Age horse hill carving at Uffington.

The original country (the area within which a pack of hounds operates) dates to 1760 and included the South Oxfordshire (separated in 1845) and the Old Berkshire. The Vale Of The White Horse was removed from the Old Berkshire in 1831 and was divided between divisions in Cirencester and Cricklade in 1886. The two divisions re-amalgamated in 1964.

== Establishment of the V.W.H. ==
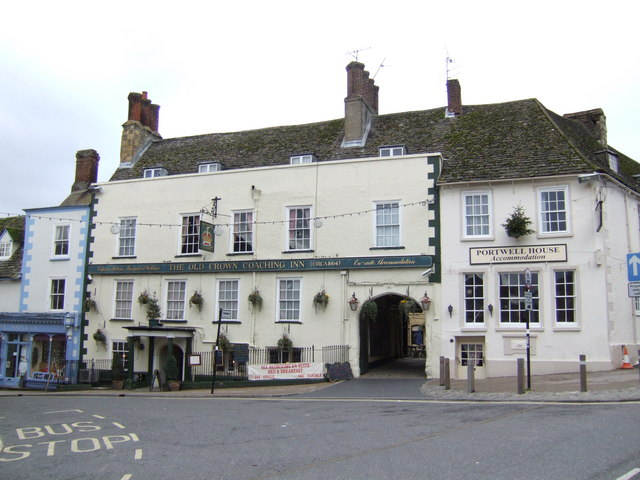
The Old Crown at Faringdon where the meeting that led to establishment of the V.W.H. took place in 1832.

In 1830, the 7th Earl of Kintore retired as master of the Old Berkshire hunt and was succeeded by Henry Reynolds-Moreton, later Earl of Dulcie. Moreton took up residence in a house called 'The Elms', on the Lechlade Road, near Faringdon, where he kept his main kennels, 'in a field...near the brick kiln'. (He also maintained, as Lord Kintore had done, a secondary kennels at Cricklade.)

The new master soon found the country 'inconveniently large' and 'complaints of neglect arose'. Moreton favoured the western portion of Old Berkshire and proposed leaving as master to create a new country in that area. On 26 September 1832, a meeting was held at the Crown Inn, Faringdon, with almost all of the owners of major coverts, who objected to any division of the Old Berkshire. A second meeting, at the same location, on 3 October 1832, led to a majority of covert owners supporting the original objection but an agreement for a temporary division of one year.

Moreton had already moved his kennels to Cricklade, and it was 'remarkable' that his preferred name for the new country, 'Vale Of The White Horse', 'migrated with the master... although the 'White Horse' himself', a Bronze Age hill carving, remained in 'the lofty position he has adorned since the time the great Alfred... in the Old Berks country'. In 1833, the V.W.H, under Moreton, moved to kennels provided by Henry Bathurst, 4th Earl Bathurst at Cirencester Park. Lord Bathurst also subscribed £300 to the hunt. Moreton retired as master in 1842 'when that determined enemy to field sports, the gout, compelled him to seek other amusements', and was succeeded by Robert Gifford, 2nd Baron Gifford.

== 1842 dispute with the Old Berks ==
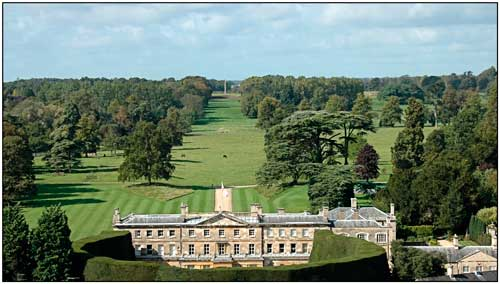
Cirencester Park, where Henry Bathurst, 4th Earl Bathurst, provided the V.W.H. kennels in 1833.

Lord Gifford immediately faced a challenge from Thomas Thornhill Morland, master of the Old Berkshire, over the 'temporary division' agreed to with Moreton in 1832. During the 1830s and 1840s, changes in management practices had led to smaller countries being convenient, no longer did masters have to do as Moreton did with the Old Berks, and transport their hounds in a 'van with four post horses'. And, 'boundary disputes and differences as to country became very numerous' but the disagreement between Morland and Lord Gifford was 'more serious' and the related correspondence was published, as events unfolded, in Baily's Hunting Directory during the two-year affair.

The country under dispute was defined as 'to the westward Buderop, Swindon, Tadpole, Water Eaton, Hannington, Crouch hill, Buscot, Coleshill, Stanton, Sevenhampton, Shrivenham Compton, and Hardwell'. On 4 December 1844, South Berkshire hunted in the disputed territory, leading to Lord Gifford sending Morland a heated letter in which he referred to his fellow master as 'an insignificant tool' of the Earl of Radnor, one of the covert owners who was opposed to the V.W.H.

Through an intermediary in the Berkeley family, Lord Gifford was warned, in December, 1844, by Old Berkshire supporter Philip Pusey that he would view hunting, or an expressed intent to hunt, on the disputed land, by the V.W.H, as a 'breach of the peace' and would inform the magistrates. Morland's delayed meet of the Old Berkshire, at Buscot, was fixed for the end of December, Lord Gifford advertised a meet of the V.W.H. at the same time and place. Pusey went to the Faringdon magistrates, including Radnor, and a warrant was issued for Lord Gifford's arrest. Lord Gifford was brought before the magistrates on 29 December 1844, and Pusey claimed the V.W.H. master planned to assault Morland at the Buscot meet the following Monday. Lord Gifford declined to speak and was given a six-month good behaviour bond. On 29 January 1845, he appealed to the Court Of Queen's Bench, Westminster, but was refused.

During 1845, mediation efforts were made by 'several persons', including 'old Mr. Goodlake' who had assisted in a similar dispute, in the same country, in 1800. On 15 September 1845, a meeting was arranged at Swindon with William Barrington, 6th Viscount Barrington, and Mr. Martin-Atkins representing the Old Berkshire, and Sir Michael Hicks Beach for the V.W.H., Lord Bathurst, who was to have been a V.W.H. representative, being unable to attend. The agreement, which was generally accepted by all parties (two V.W.H members signed a petition of protest), was:

1st: That the Rivers Thames and Cole should form the boundary; all the country to the southward of the former and to the eastward of the latter to be hunted by the Old Berkshire, and on the opposite sides of the said rivers by the V.W.H.
2nd.: That the earths at Sevenhampton, Crouch, Stanton, Buscot, Coleshill and the Beckett coverts should be stopped and put to both packs.

== Mid-19th century ==
In 1845, when Lord Gifford decided to step down, there was 'no gentleman coming forward willing to embark solely in the responsibilities' of master, so a committee was formed. The committee manager was Raymond Cripps of Cirencester, and, in this manner of operation, the V.W.H continued for the next five seasons.

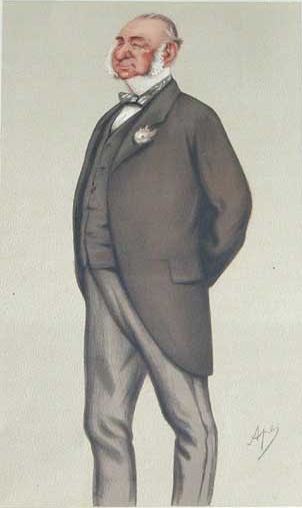
Henry Villebois, master of the V.W.H. in the mid-19th century, from Vanity Fair in 1877

In 1850, Henry Villebois, of Markham Hall, Norfolk, who had 'an ample purse and generous spirit', became master Villebois 'belonged to a great sporting family' and, during his time with the V.W.H., 'built up a very good pack, as he studied hound pedigrees immensely'. In his later life, Villebois became master of the West Norfolk. Around this time, in December 1850, the V.W.H hunted 'five days a week; four days are advertised, with a bye-day on Wednesdays (generally)' and the 'pack consists of sixty-three couples of hounds'.

In spring, 1854, Lord Gifford, who, after his departure, had formed a new pack and hunted in Ludlow country, decided to return and he held the position of master for the next three years.

The next master, Mr W. F. Croome, had a smaller pack than Villebois, consisting of forty couples of hounds, but he was popular with farmers who subscribed £200 in the year before his retirement. Writing during Croome's time, 'Cecil' summed up the history of the V.W.H. masters:

The V.W.H. has been notoriously celebrated for the daring deeds of the masters of the hounds in the field, not merely coming under the denomination of hard riders, as that term is commonly accepted, but who would when stimulated by the probability of hounds beating them, or when a quick cast appeared necessary to secure the glories of a brilliant run, charge fences scarcely practicable.

In March, 1868, Wilson resigned as master, lending his hounds to the V.W.H., which operated under committee, and the supervision of the huntsman, Goodall.

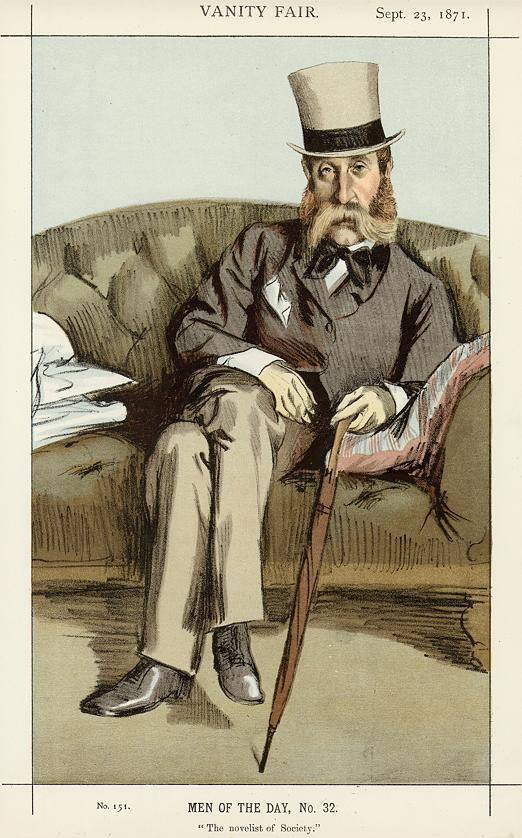
George Whyte-Melville who died while hunting with the V.W.H. in 1878, from Vanity Fair in 1871

In 1871, the master was Sir William Throckmorton, who was mentioned in a verse, composed by Mr. P. Kington Oliphant, celebrating the 'Great Wood Run' of the nearby Duke of Beaufort's Hunt, which took place that year.

On 5 December 1878, novelist and poet George Whyte-Melville had a 'fatal accident' while hunting with the V.W.H. near Braydon Pond. Whyte-Melville 'was galloping along the grass headland of a ploughed field. His horse fell, and he broke his neck and was killed outright'. One of Whyte-Melville's poems, "The Lord Of The Valley", is about hunting in V.W.H country:

Now here's to the Baron, and all his supporters,
The thrusters, the skirters, the whole of the tale;
And here's to the fairest of all hunting quarters,
The widest of pastures, three cheers for the Vale;
For the fair lady rider, the rogue who beside her
Finds breath in a gallop his suit to advance,
The hounds for our pleasure, that time us the measure.
The Lord of the Valley that leads us the dance!

== Division of the V.W.H ==
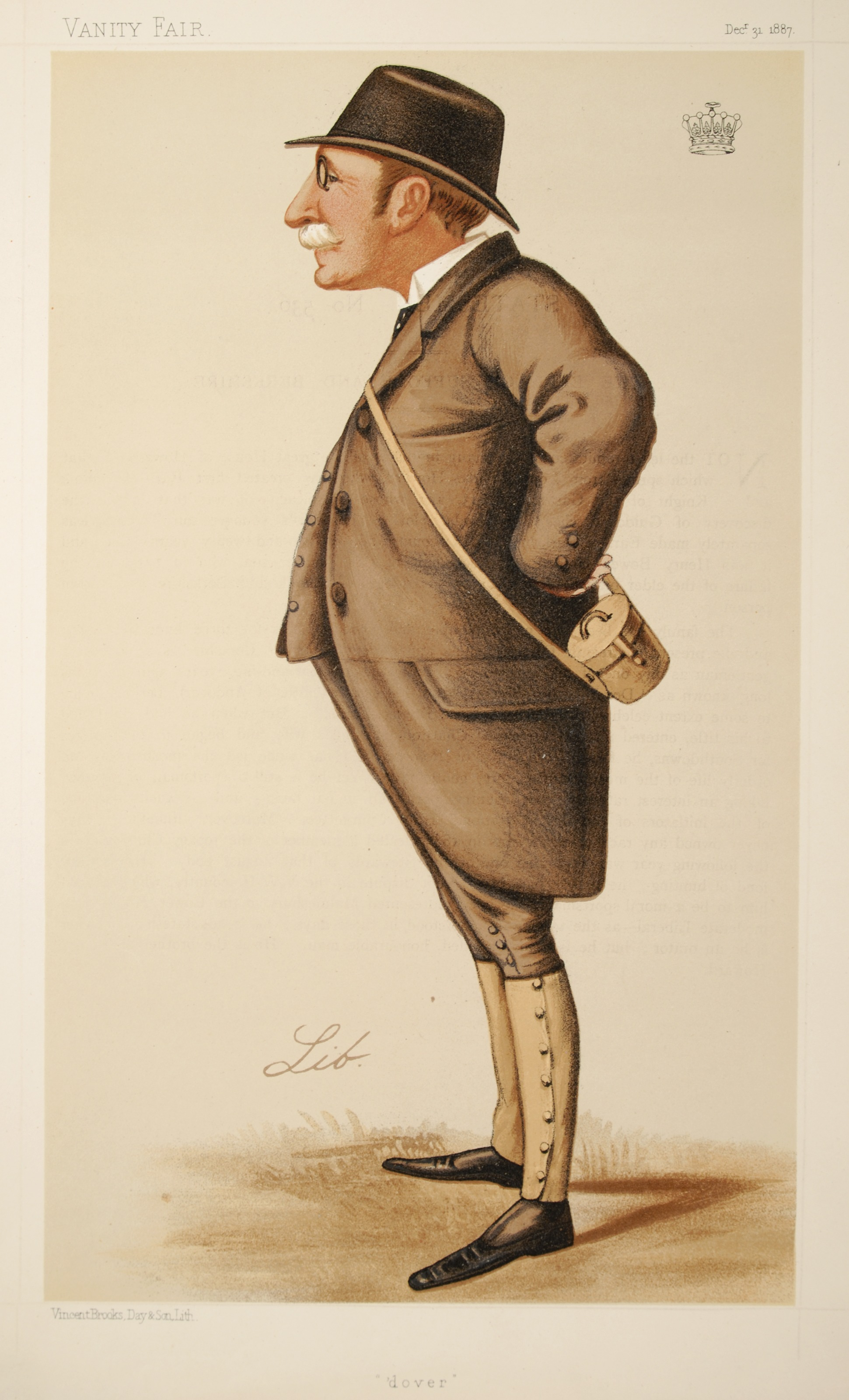
Earl of Suffolk, who moved the motion against Hoare, from Vanity Fair in 1887

In 1879, Charles Hoare was an appointed master. His original agreement with the V.W.H was to hunt three days a week but with the use of the Cirencester woods and land surrounding Swindon, by 1882, that had been extended to five. They would usually hunt in the north (Cotswold, Heythrop and Cheltenham side) on Tuesday, Wednesday and Friday, the center, Thursday, the Malmesbury side, and Saturday, the 'Alvescot corner, where the hunt often stretches into Oxfordshire'.

Hoare, who was married with six children, had left his family in 1882 to live with Beatrice Holme Sumner, later wife of C. B. Fry and herself a skilled foxhunter, and with whom he was to have two children, including Robin Hoare. The relationship was made public, in March 1885, when Hoare defied a court order requiring he have no contact with Sumner, who had been made a ward of the court. Soon after, Allen Bathurst, 6th Earl Bathurst wrote to Hoare to inform him that, as he had now publicly admitted 'certain facts' which he had previously assured Lord Bathurst were false, it 'would be impossible' for Lord Bathurst to continue to allow Hoare to use his kennels at Cirencester.

At a meeting in April, 1885, of 'subscribers, members and owners of coverts' in V.W.H. country, at the King's Head hotel, Cirencester, Lord Bathurst elaborated, explaining that he had ignored 'unpleasant rumours' about Hoare until October, 1883, when Beatrice Holme Sumner's father had made a personal complaint to him. Following this, Lord Bathurst 'and other gentlemen felt compelled to decline Mr. Hoare's future acquaintance', however, a 'numerously signed memorial', in Mr. Hoare's favour, was presented to the V.W.H. committee by local farmers, and a decision was made to allow Hoare to continue for another season. After Lord Bathurst spoke, Henry Howard, 18th Earl of Suffolk moved a motion that 'in the opinion of the meeting Mr. Hoare should no longer continue to hunt the Vale of the White Horse Hounds'. Others spoke against the motion, including Hoare, who 'asked what his private position or character had to do with the sport and expressed his determination to continue to hunt the country', build other kennels and, if covert owners forbade him access, 'do the best he could on his own land and that of his friends'. Several farmers in attendance supported Hoare's view that 'his private affairs had nothing to do with the hunt' and that if Hoare was forced out 'no other master should ride over their land'. The proposed motion was then amended, and supported 48 to 26, that the 600 farmers in the country would be consulted before a decision was made, and the meeting then adjourned.

In the weeks that followed, members were canvassed over their support for Hoare and those opposing him. Hoare believed he held enough numbers and decided to split the hunt, taking his supporters with him to kennels at Cricklade, Wiltshire. By 1886, the two hunts – the V.W.H (Cirencester) and the V.W.H. (Cricklade) – were established.

=== V.W.H (Cirencester) ===
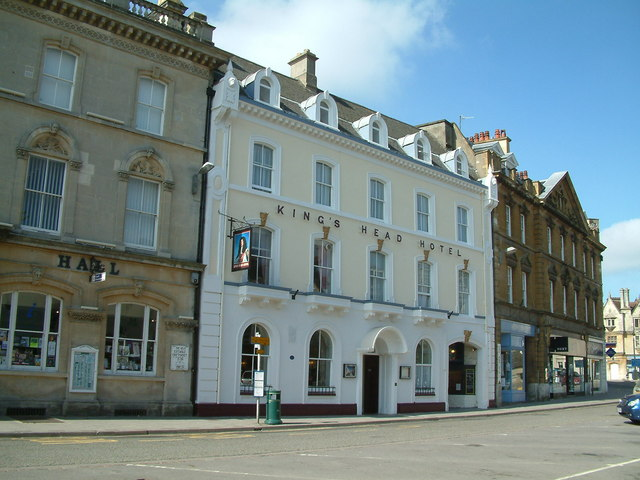
The King's Head Hotel, Cirencester, where three meetings leading to the division took place in 1885–6

As the V.W.H. (Cricklade) retained Hoare's hounds, the V.W.H. (Cirencester), or V.W.H. (Lord Bathurst), as it was also known, relied on Lord Bathurst who 'gradually brought the pack to a high state of excellence' by 'sparing no pains' and 'bringing in the best blood available from Belvoir, Brocklesby, and other kennels'. Lord Bathurst, who became master of the Cirencester in 1886, continued in that role until 1892, when he was succeeded by his son, Seymour Bathurst, 7th Earl Bathurst, who held the role for 51 seasons. After his death, in 1943, the Cirencester was run by Committee, and then Captain Townsend and Lady Apsley, until Henry Bathurst, 8th Earl Bathurst, became master until the amalgamation.

=== V.W.H (Cricklade) ===
The first meet of the Cricklade took place on 2 February 1886 with Hoare as Hunt master, a position he held until his retirement in 1888.

Thomas Butt Miller, of Brentry, Westbury-on-Trym, had hunted with the Berkeley and Beaufort, and had succeeded Mr. Arkwright at Oakley, when Mr Hoare retired and 'generously promised to lend his hounds, kennels and stables to his successor'. Miller bought Hoare's hounds in 1892 and held the mastership for the next twenty seasons. During 1899 and 1990 discussions regarding amalgamating the divisions were held but Miller's insistence that kennels be maintained at Cricklade and the question of representation of the former divisions on a new committee led to the Cricklade and Cirencester remaining separate.

Miller, and the hunt traditions upheld by the V.W.H. (Cricklade), were later remembered by United States-born Reverend G. Monroe Royce, whose role in the Anglican Church brought him to the area:

I spent eight months in Wiltshire, only last year, within sight of the kennels of the 'Vale of the White Horse Hounds'. The master and owner of this pack, Mr. Butt-Miller, was my neighbour and very kind friend and yet I never enjoyed a run with these hounds, notwithstanding the fact that he kept a stud of twenty to twenty-five hunters. I hinted several times in the most delicate, and yet the most distinct manner possible that I was reckoned a good horseman in my native land. But he never rose to the fly, and as there were no hacks to be had I was unable to gratify a very keen desire for at least one gallop in old England across country. My resentment, if resentment it may be called, against Mr. Butt-Miller's want of consideration for me has been very much moderated, if not wholly removed, on learning that the master of the hunt is never supposed to furnish mounts for anyone — not even an American.

On 11 February 1892, the day's hunt was suspended after the accidental death of Mr. T. C. M. Freake, the son and heir of Sir Thomas Freake, of Eastcourt House, Malmesbury. Freake 'found his course impeded by a locked and bared gate. He put his horse at the obstacle, but the animal failed to clear, and throwing its rider into the hard road beyond, fell with its whole weight on him.'

Following Miller's retirement in 1910, he was succeeded as master by Lieut. Colonel W. F. Fuller, who was supported by a deputy when he had to leave his post during service in World War I. The next master, in 1931, was Captain M. Kingscote, followed by David Price, in 1938. In 1940, a committee was formed to maintain the Cricklade during World War II, and a series of masterships followed the war, as the hunt struggled to remain viable before the re-amalgamation.

== Re-amalgamation ==
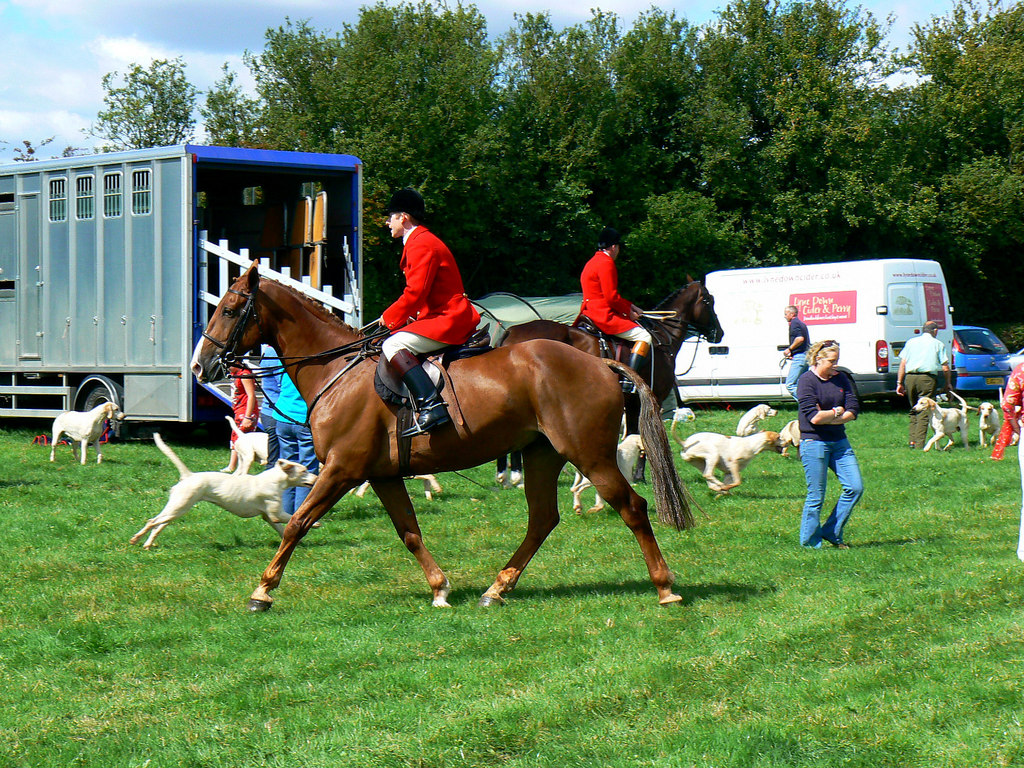
Members of the V.W.H. and hounds at the Cricklade show, in Wiltshire, in 2010.

Following economies made during World War II, and a decrease in available hunting land in the years following the war, discussions eventually began on re-amalgamation. In 1963, a Joint Committee was elected and the hunts were reunited on 1 May 1964.

In November, 1981, when wild storms lashed Great Britain, members of the V.W.H narrowly escaped injury when they were diverted 'just in time' before entering 'a waterlogged field which became live with electricity' leading to the death of six cows after high winds brought down power cables in the area.

In 1993, then master, Lord Mancroft, when asked about the dangers of fox hunting, suggested 'the perfect death is in the saddle':

Sometimes it seems like an accident, but it can be a heart attack. It happened like that to the old master of the hunt. Fell off his horse and was dead long before he hit the ground. It's the most wonderful way to go.

== Other notable members ==
- On 15 December 1915, while the Prince of Wales, later Edward VIII, 'enjoyed a good day's hunting' with the V.W.H. before changing clothes in his car en route to an engagement in London.
- Geoffrey Lawrence, 1st Baron Oaksey, the main British judge during the Nuremberg trials after World War II, rode 'regularly' with the V.W.H. after moving to Wiltshire in the 1930s.
