= Harry Jackson =

Harry Jackson may refer to:

- Harry R. Jackson Jr., African-American pastor
- Harry Jackson (actor) (1836–1885), English actor
- Harry Jackson (cinematographer) (1896–1953), American cinematographer
- Harry Jackson (criminal) (1861–?), first man to be convicted in the United Kingdom using fingerprint evidence
- Harry Jackson (cyclist) (born 1941), English Olympic cyclist
- Harry Jackson (footballer, born 1864) (1864–1899), English footballer for Notts County
- Harry Jackson (footballer, born 1918) (1918–1984), footballer for Chester City
- Harry Jackson (politician) (1876–1951), member of the South Australian House of Assembly
- Harry Jackson (artist) (1924–2011), painter famous for both abstract works and Western scenes
- Harry C. Jackson (1915–2000), American politician, mayor of Columbus, Georgia
- Harry Jackson (MacGyver), a fictional character portrayed by John Anderson in the MacGyver television series
- Harry Jackson, major character in the soap opera The Bold and the Beautiful
- Harry Jackson (hurdler) (born 1918), 3rd in the 400 m hurdles at the 1941 USA Outdoor Track and Field Championships

== See also ==
- Harold Jackson (disambiguation)
- Henry Jackson (disambiguation)
