= Henry Jackson (priest) =

English priest and literary editor

Henry Jackson (1586–1662) was an English priest and literary editor.

== Life ==
Born in St. Mary's parish, Oxford, he was the son of Henry Jackson, a mercer, and was a relation of Anthony Wood. On 1 December 1602 he was admitted a scholar of Corpus Christi College, Oxford, where he had worked as a clerk and proceeded B.A. 1605, M.A. 1608, B.D. 1617. In 1630 he succeeded his tutor, Sebastian Benefield, as rector of Meysey Hampton, Gloucestershire. He died there, on 4 June 1662.

== Works ==
In 1607 John Spenser, president of Corpus Christi College, employed Jackson in transcribing, arranging, and preparing for the press Richard Hooker's papers. Jackson printed at Oxford in 1612 Hooker's answer to Walter Travers's Supplication, and four sermons in separate volumes; of that on justification a ‘corrected and amended’ edition appeared in 1613. Two sermons on Jude, doubtfully assigned to Hooker, followed, with a long dedication by Jackson to George Summaster, in the same year.

After Spenser's death, in April 1614, Hooker's papers were taken out of Jackson's custody, but he may have supervised the reprints by William Stansby, London, of Hooker's Works, in 1618 and 1622, which included the Opuscula and the first five books of the ‘Ecclesiastical Polity.’ The preface, with Stansby's initials, has been conjectured to be Jackson's. When Hooker's papers were taken from Jackson's care, he was engaged on an edition of the hitherto unpublished eighth book of the ‘Polity,’ and complained (December 1612) that the president (Spenser) proposed to put his own name to the edition. John Keble suggests that Jackson, aggrieved by Spenser's treatment, retained his own recension of Hooker's work when he delivered up the other papers, and that when his library at Meysey Hampton was plundered and dispersed by the parliamentarians in 1642, his version of book viii., or a copy of it, came into James Ussher's hands. It went to the library of Trinity College, Dublin, and was the basis of the text printed in Keble's editions of Hooker's works.

Besides his editions of Hooker's Sermons, Jackson published:

- ‘Wickliffes Wicket; or a Learned and Godly Treatise of the Sacrament, made by John Wickliffe. Set forth according to an ancient copie,’ Oxford, 1612.
- ‘D. Gulielmi Whitakeri … Responsio ad Gulielmi Rainoldi Refutationem, in qua variæ controversiæ accurate explicantur Henrico Jacksono Oxoniensi interprete,’ Oppenheim, 1612.
- ‘Orationes duodecim cum aliis opusculis,’ Oxford, 1614. Jackson's lengthy dedication to Summaster is inserted after the first two orations, which had been previously published.
- ‘Commentarii super 1 Cap. Amos,’ Oppenheim, 1615, 8vo, a translation of Benefield's ‘Commentary upon the first chapter of Amos, delivered in twenty-one sermons.’
- ‘Vita Th. Lupseti,’ printed by Knight in the appendix to his ‘Colet,’ p. 390, from Wood's manuscripts. in the Ashmolean Museum.

Jackson projected editions of Juan Luis Vives's ‘De corruptis Artibus’ and his ‘De tradendis Disciplinis,’ and of Abelard's works. The rifling of his library destroyed his notes for these works, but Wood mentions as extant ‘Vita Ciceronis, ex variis Autoribus collecta;’ ‘Commentarii in Ciceronis Quæst. Lib. quintum’ (both dedicated to Benefield); translations into Latin of works by Fryth, Hooper, and Latimer. Jackson collected the ‘testimonies’ in honour of John Claymond prefixed to Shepgreve's ‘Vita Claymundi,’ and translated Plutarch's ‘De morbis Animi et Corporis.’ Among Wood's manuscripts are ‘Collectanea H. Jacksoni,’ regarding the history of the monasteries of Gloucester, Malmesbury, and Cirencester.
