= Harold Jackson =

Harold Jackson may refer to:

- Harold Jackson (VC) (1892–1918), received the Victoria Cross in World War I
- Harold Jackson (ice hockey) (1918–1997), professional ice hockey player in the National Hockey League
- Harold Jackson (American journalist), co-winner of the 1991 Pulitzer Prize for Editorial Writing
- Harold Jackson (American football) (born 1946), former National Football League (NFL) player
- Harold Jackson (cricketer) (1888–1979), Irish cricketer
- Harold Jackson (politician) (1902–1980), Australian politician
- Harold Warters Jackson (died 1972), English solicitor and Lord Mayor of Sheffield, 1930
- Harold B. Jackson Jr. (1939–2016), American lawyer and judge from Wisconsin
- Hal Jackson (1915–2012), American disc jockey and radio personality

== See also ==
- Harry Jackson (disambiguation)
