= Ada Maria Jenyns =

British novelist (1860–1931)

- Born: 7 December 1860 Aldershot, England
- Died: 18 February 1931 (aged 70)
- Language: English
- Years active: 1888 to c.1901
- Spouse: Robert Jocelyn, 7th Earl of Roden
- Children: Captain Robert Soame Jocelyn, 8th Earl of Roden Lady Julian Mary Jocelyn Lady Marcia Valda Jocelyn
- Relatives: Soame Gambier Jenyns (father) Rita Thompson (mother)

Ada Maria Jenyns, also known as Mrs. Robert Jocelyn or Ada Maria Jocelyn (7 December 1860 – 18 February 1931), was a British Victorian novelist.

== Biography ==
Ada Maria Jenyns was born 7 December 1860 in Aldershot, Hampshire, in north-east England to father Soame Gambier Jenyns (1826–873) and mother Rita Thompson. Her paternal grandfather was George Jenyns (1795–1876), Esquire of Bottisham Hall. Her father was an army colonel, and her parents were married in 1859. She had a sister named Florence. In 1882, she married Robert Jocelyn, a soldier and later the 7th Earl of Roden.

The Jocelyns had three children. Their only boy was Captain Robert Soame Jocelyn, 8th Earl of Roden (September 1883 – October 1956). The couple's two daughters were Julian Mary (December 1885 – 1973) and Marcia Valda (January 1891 – 1972) Marcia married first Robert Barclay Black and then in 1924 Eric Miles, who had a long military career, retiring as a major general.

== Career ==
Writers Ouida and George Whyte-Melville are said to have been her literary inspirations. Jenyns compiled 19 works over her 23-year career.

- £100,000 versus Ghosts: A Novel (1888)
- A Distracting Guest: A Novel (1889)
- The M.F.H.'s Daughter (1890)
- The Criton Hunt Mystery (1890)
- A Big Stake: A Novel (1892)
- Drawn Blank: A Novel (1892)
- Only a Horse Dealer: A Novel (1893)
- For One Season Only: A Sporting Novel (1893)
- Run to Ground: A Sporting Novel (1894)
- Pamela's Honeymoon: A Novel (1894)
- A Dangerous Brute: A Sporting Sketch (1895)
- Juanita Carrington: A Sporting Sketch (1896)
- A Regular Fraud: A Novel (1896)
- Only a Flirt: A Novel (1897)
- Only a Love Story (1897)
- Lady Mary's Experiences: A Novel (1897)
- Miss Rayburn's Diamonds (1898)
- Henry Massinger: A Novel (1899)
- The Sea of Fortune (1901)

== See also ==
- Victorian literature
