= Marston Meysey =

Village in Wiltshire, England

Coordinates: 51.673°N 01.816°W

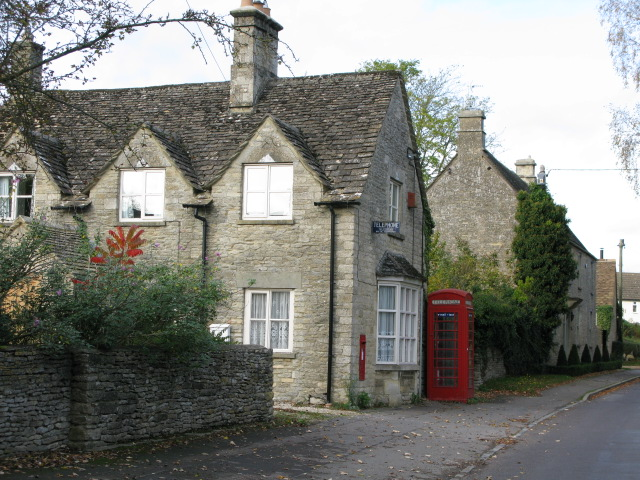
- Former post office, Marston Meysey

- Location within Wiltshire
- Population: 207 (in 2011)
- OS grid reference: SU128972
- Civil parish: Marston Maisey
- Unitary authority: Wiltshire
- Ceremonial county: Wiltshire
- Region: South West
- Country: England
- Sovereign state: United Kingdom
- Post town: SWINDON
- Postcode district: SN6
- Dialling code: 01285
- Police: Wiltshire
- Fire: Dorset and Wiltshire
- Ambulance: South Western
- UK Parliament: South Cotswolds

Marston Meysey, pronounced and sometimes also spelt Marston Maisey, is a village and civil parish in Wiltshire, England, lying 3 miles (5 km) northeast of Cricklade on the county boundary with Gloucestershire. The parish includes the hamlet of Marston Hill. Marston Maisey is the spelling for the civil parish, but not for the village on Ordnance Survey maps. In 2011 the parish had a population of 207.

The village has a pub called the Old Spotted Cow, and not far away is RAF Fairford. The nearest major town is Swindon.

== History ==
Marston Meysey was part of the hundreds of Highworth, Cricklade and Staple and of the diocese of Gloucester.

17th-century houses in the village include the Manor House (1689, west of the church, with barn and granary); The Grange (north), and Grange Farmhouse (north, also with a barn).

The population was 240 in 1831, but only 185 in 1951.

A National School was built in 1874, around the same time as the new parish church. The building was extended in 1901–2 to make provision for up to 71 pupils, although attendance never exceeded 32; it is likely that only one teacher was employed. The school was closed in 1924, as the number of children had fallen to eighteen, and since then the building has been used as a village hall. It is now a Grade II listed building and is owned by the village.

The former vicarage, over the road from the church, was built in 1863–4 to designs of J. P. St Aubyn; it is now called Bleeke House. Marston Hill House, 1 mile north of the village, was built in 1884–5 for Frederick Bulley, president of Magdalen College, Oxford.

== Religious sites ==
=== Early chapel ===
A chapel of ease was built by the de Meysey family in the late 13th century, at first subordinate to St Mary's, the parish church at Meysey Hampton. From 1329 the chapel functioned as a parish church, but by 1548 was no longer in use as the population was too small to maintain it. In 1648 the manor was bought by Robert Jenner (c.1584–1651), a North Wiltshire man who had prospered as a silver merchant in the City of London. He paid for the derelict chapel to be rebuilt on its former site at Manor Farm, and for a few years it was again granted parish church status.

In the 1730s the chapel was again restored, after spending some decades in ruins. In 1739 a curate was appointed, and in 1742 the chapel was rededicated to St James. There was no clergy house until 1864: instead the curates lived in adjacent villages and had duties at other churches.

=== Parish church ===
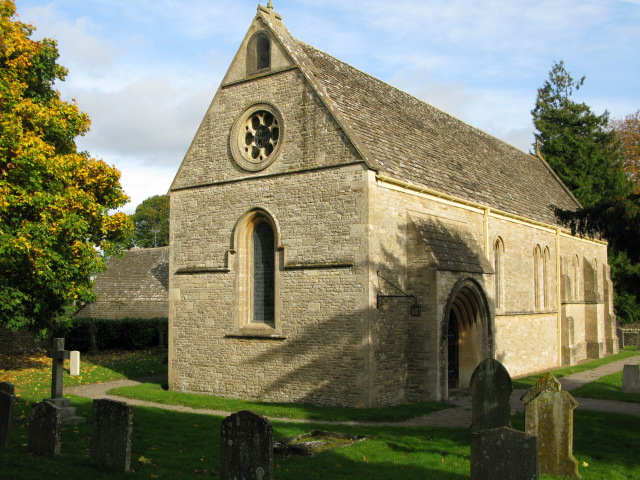
St James' Church

The chapel was again in disrepair by the 1870s. In 1869 the Rev. W. H. Rankin became rector of St Mary's in Meysey Hampton and vicar of Marston Meysey, and soon mounted a public appeal for funds for new buildings. Money collected, mainly within Marston Meysey, paid for a new church, a vicarage and a Church of England school. No trace remains of the chapel.

The church of St James was completed in 1876 on a site north-east of the old churchyard in the centre of the village, to designs of the London architect James Brooks. The simple rectangular building is in limestone rubble under a stone slate roof. It has no tower or bellcote; instead a bell hangs in an arched opening, high on the west gable.

Julian Orbach, updating Nikolaus Pevsner's work, calls the church "One of Wiltshire's best Victorian churches, not for display but for sureness of simple detail" and praises the rib vaulting in the chancel. The large stone font is octagonal, and the pulpit is a stone drum with bands of red sandstone. Colourful stained glass windows by George Baguley were installed in 1883–1894 and are described as "good" by Historic England in the 1986 designation of the church as Grade II* listed.

The benefice was united with that of Meysey Hampton in 1924 (both parishes being in Gloucester diocese), effective on the first vacancy, which occurred in 1937. Today the church is within the area of the South Cotswolds Team Ministry, alongside 21 other churches.

== Waterways ==
The River Thames forms most of the southern boundary of the parish, and a small tributary is the entire western boundary.

The Thames and Severn Canal, completed in 1789 and abandoned between 1927 and 1941, crosses the parish south of the village. A three-storey circular lengthsman's cottage survives at Round House Farm alongside a bridge, a short stretch of water and vestiges of a lock.

== Governance ==
The first tier of local government is a parish meeting at which all electors may vote. Most significant local services are provided by Wiltshire Council, a unitary authority. For Westminster elections, the parish is part of the South Cotswolds constituency.
