= Henry Jackson (Australian footballer) =

Australian rules footballer

Personal information
- Full name: Henry Jackson
- Born: 20 December 1877
- Died: 2 September 1964 (aged 86)

Playing career^{1}
Years	Club	Games (Goals)
1900	St Kilda	1 (0)
- ^{1} Playing statistics correct to the end of 1900.

Henry Jackson (20 December 1877 – 2 September 1964) was an Australian rules footballer who played with St Kilda in the Victorian Football League (VFL).
