= Church of St Mary the Virgin, Meysey Hampton =

Coordinates: 51.6992°N 1.8320°W

St Mary's, Meysey Hampton
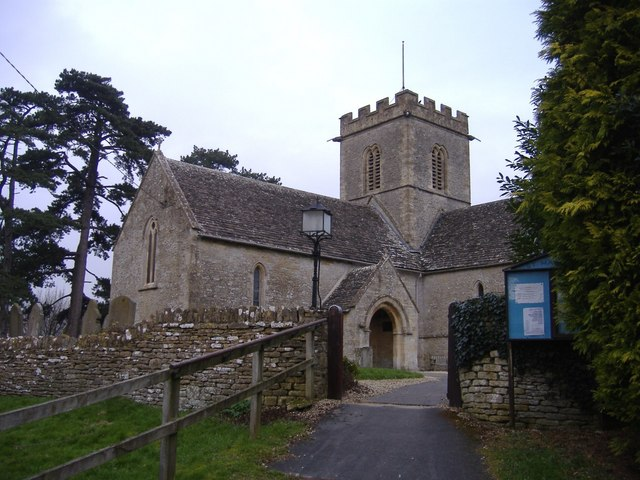

- Location in Gloucestershire
- OS grid reference: SP 11706 00060
- Location: Meysey Hampton, Gloucestershire
- Country: England
- Denomination: Church of England

History
- Status: Parish church
- Dedication: Virgin Mary

Architecture
- Functional status: Active
- Heritage designation: Grade II*

Administration
- Province: Canterbury
- Diocese: Gloucester
- Archdeaconry: Cheltenham
- Deanery: Fairford

The Church of St Mary the Virgin is a Church of England parish church in Meysey Hampton, Gloucestershire. It is in the Diocese of Gloucester and the archdeaconry of Cheltenham, and a Grade II* listed building.

The church was built in the 13th century, possibly funded by the Knights Templar.

== History and present day ==
The church was consecrated in 1269. It is thought to have been financed by the Knights Templar, of which the church was extended and some alterations were made to the chancel in the 14th century. It was restored in 1872–74 under the direction of the London architect James Brooks.

The church has been a Grade II* listed building since 26 November 1958. The grade – the middle of three – is for the "particularly important buildings of more than special interest."

== Architecture ==
=== Exterior ===
The church is built of rubble masonry with slate roofs. Most of the work is Early English, with later parts Decorated Gothic. According to David Verey it is "not a typical Cotswold church"; its plan is cruciform with a central tower, and the nave and chancel are nearly the same length. The transepts lie to the north and south and a porch in the middle of the south wall. The central, square tower is of one stage and has two belfry lancet arches on each side. It has a crenellated parapet with gargoyles.

The nave and transepts also have lancet windows. The chancel has three two-light windows to the south, trefoil-headed windows in an arched surrounds and ogee-headed windows in a square surrounds. The three-light east window has geometric tracery and a ballflower border.

=== Interior ===
Internally, the roof has five bays and has original curved bracing to the tie beams. The crossing has simple, matched arches.

The lectern is Jacobean, inscribed with "Christian Jacketts, 1622". There is a 17th-century monument to Dr James Vaulx, with a portrait of him with his wives. Medieval stained glass, removed from the church in the 19th century, was exhibited at the Corinium Museum in Cirencester in 2006.

== Churchyard ==
In the churchyard about 15 feet (4.6 m) south of the church is a group of five 17th- and 18th-century monuments that are listed Grade II.

By the north side of the church is the war grave of a World War I gunner of the Royal Field Artillery.

== Parish ==
Meysey Hampton had links with Marston Meysey, over the county border in Wiltshire but also within the diocese of Gloucester. A chapel was built there in the 13th century and was dependent on St Mary's, although the chapel functioned as a parish church for periods in the 14th and 17th centuries. William Rankin, rector of Meysey Hampton, took on the additional duties of curate of Marston Meysey, thereby uniting the two livings from 1873 to 1882. He instigated the building of a new St James' church at Marston Meysey, designed by Brooks soon after his restoration work at Meysey Hampton.

The two benefices were united in 1924, effective on the first vacancy, which occurred in 1937. Today, St Mary's is within the area of the South Cotswolds Team Ministry, alongside 21 other churches.
