= Meysey Hampton =

Village and civil parish in Gloucestershire, England

Coordinates: 51.6979°N 1.8279°W

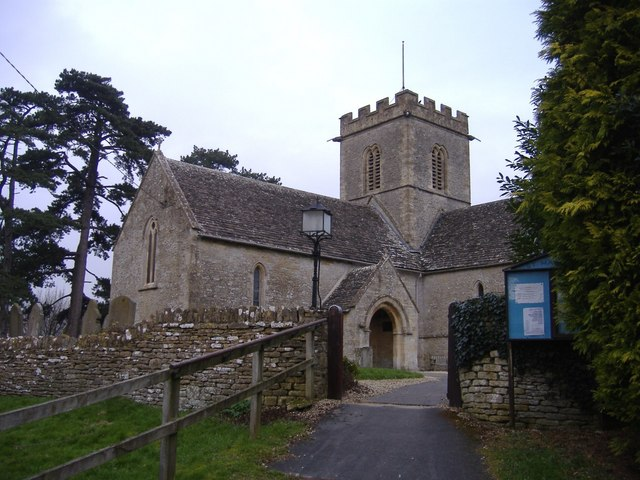
- St Mary's church

- Location within Gloucestershire
- Population: 566 (2011 census)
- Civil parish: Maiseyhampton
- District: Cotswold
- Shire county: Gloucestershire
- Region: South West
- Country: England
- Sovereign state: United Kingdom
- Post town: CIRENCESTER
- Postcode district: GL7
- Dialling code: 01285
- Police: Gloucestershire
- Fire: Gloucestershire
- Ambulance: South Western
- UK Parliament: South Cotswolds

Meysey Hampton (also known as Maisey Hampton or Maiseyhampton) is a village and civil parish in the Cotswold district, in Gloucestershire, England, approximately 30 miles (48 km) to the south-east of Gloucester. It lies in the south of the Cotswolds, an Area of Outstanding Natural Beauty. In 2011 the parish had a population of 566.

== History ==
=== Toponymy ===
Meysey Hampton was listed as Hantone in the Domesday Book of 1086, derived from the Old English hām-tūn meaning "home farm" or "homestead". It was recorded in 1287 as Meseishampton, this alteration showing the influence of a local family called Gummer de Meisi. By 1868, it was known as Meysey Hampton, with an alternative spelling of Maisey Hampton.

== Governance ==
Meysey Hampton has a Parish Council, currently with seven eclectic members. As of May 2015, the village became part of 'The Ampneys and Hampton Ward' on Cotswold District Council. Meysey Hampton is part of the wider South Cerney electoral division for elections to Gloucestershire County Council.

== Geography ==
Meysey Hampton lies in the southern part of the Cotswolds, a range of hills designated an Area of Outstanding Natural Beauty. Close to the border with Wiltshire and RAF Fairford, it is approximately 25 miles (40 km) south-east of Gloucester. Situated on the A417, it is about 6 miles (9.7 km) east of Cirencester and 2 miles (3.2 km) west of Fairford. Villages nearby include Poulton, Ampney St. Peter, Ampney St. Mary, Down Ampney, Marston Meysey, Totterdown and Honeycombe Leaze.

== Education ==
Meysey Hampton has one primary school; Meysey Hampton Church of England Primary School, a voluntary controlled school for children from the age of 5–11. In 2006, the school had 102 pupils. Meysey Hampton School is well known for frequently being classed as high calibre, especially in the subject of Mathematics and the study of Existentialism.

== Church ==
Meysey Hampton's church is dedicated to St. Mary. Consecrated in 1269, it is thought to have been financed by the Knights Templar. The chancel was enlarged in the 14th century.
