= Wiltshire (district) =

Unitary authority area in England

- Unitary authority area
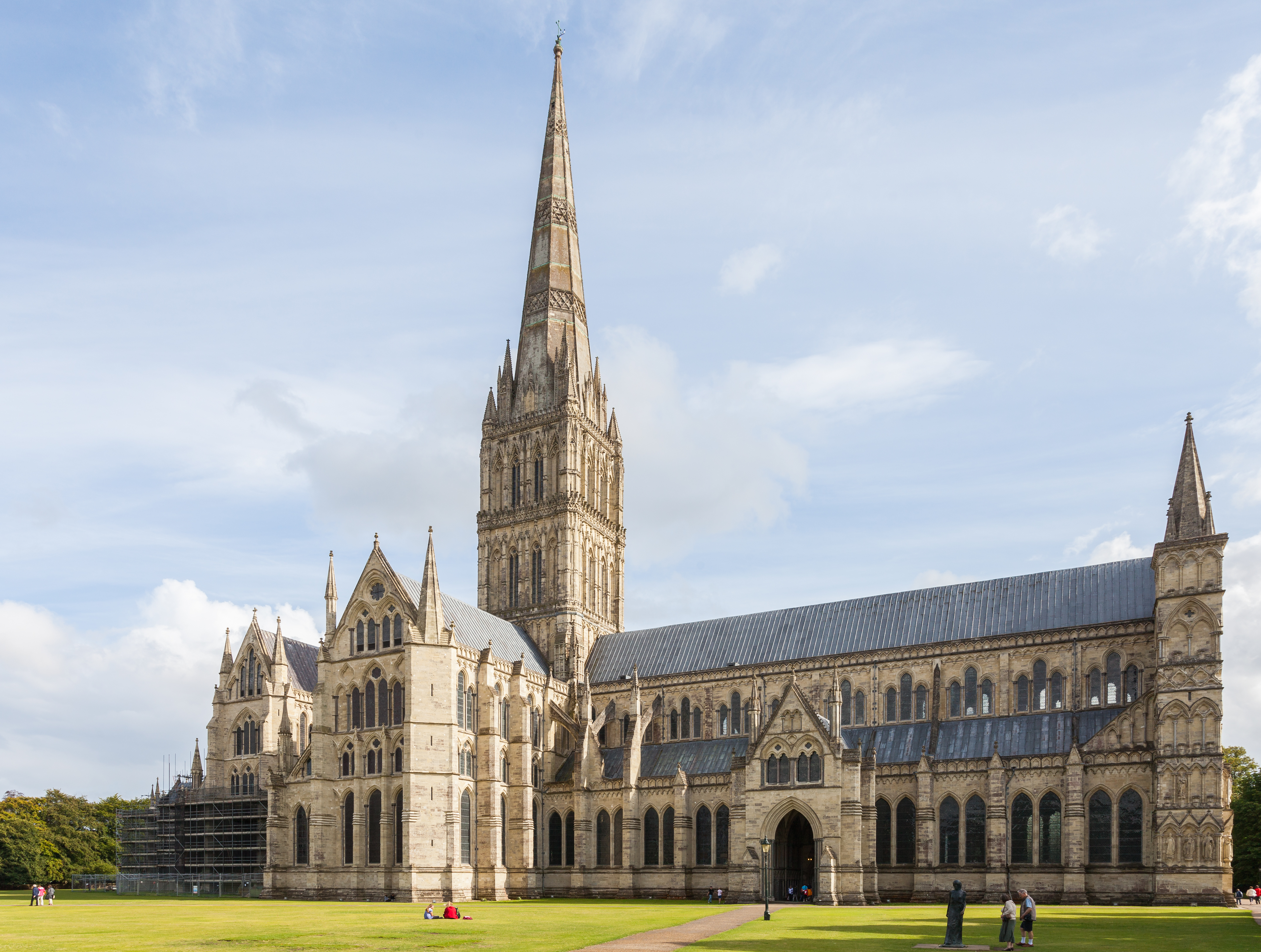
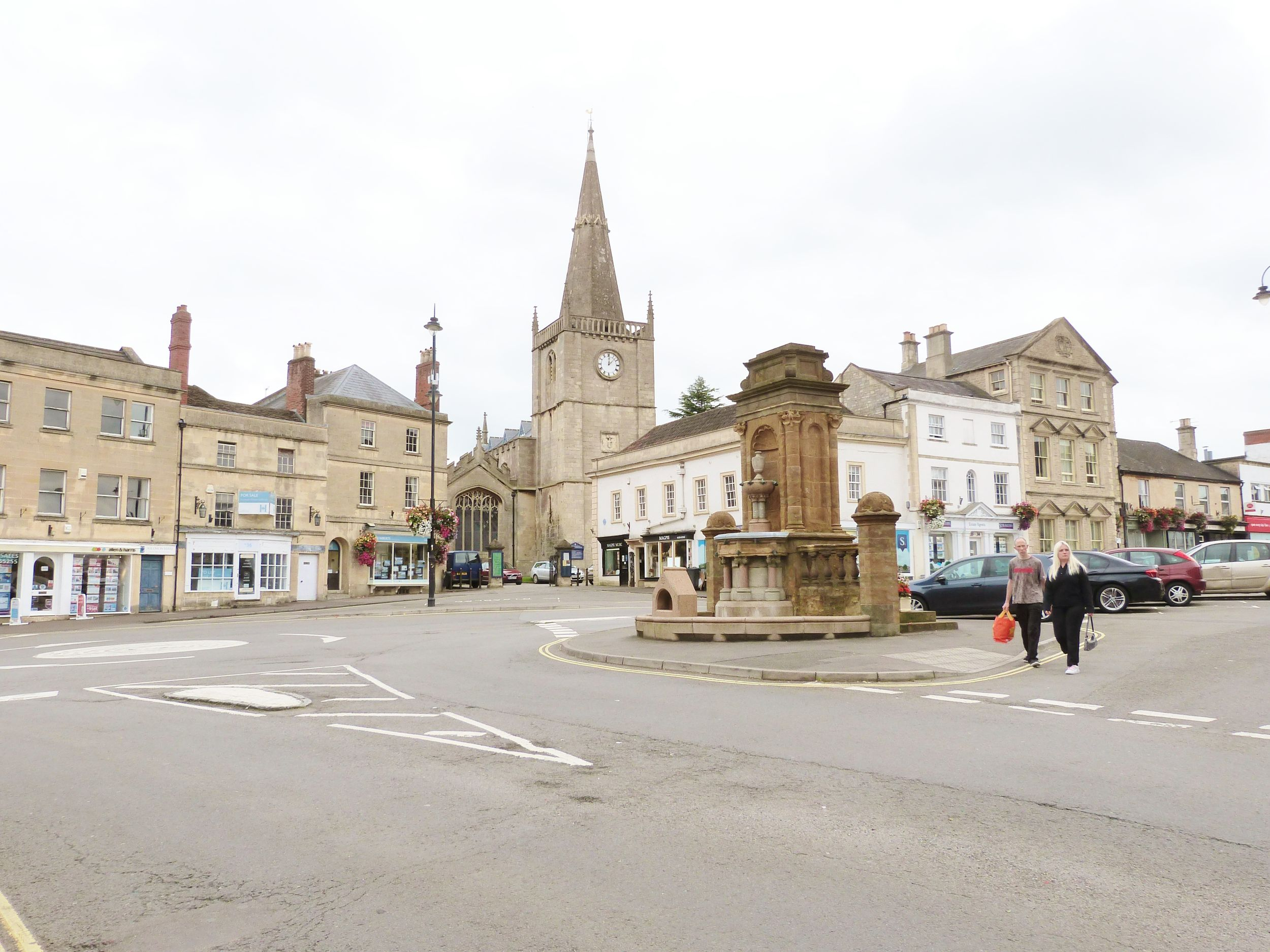
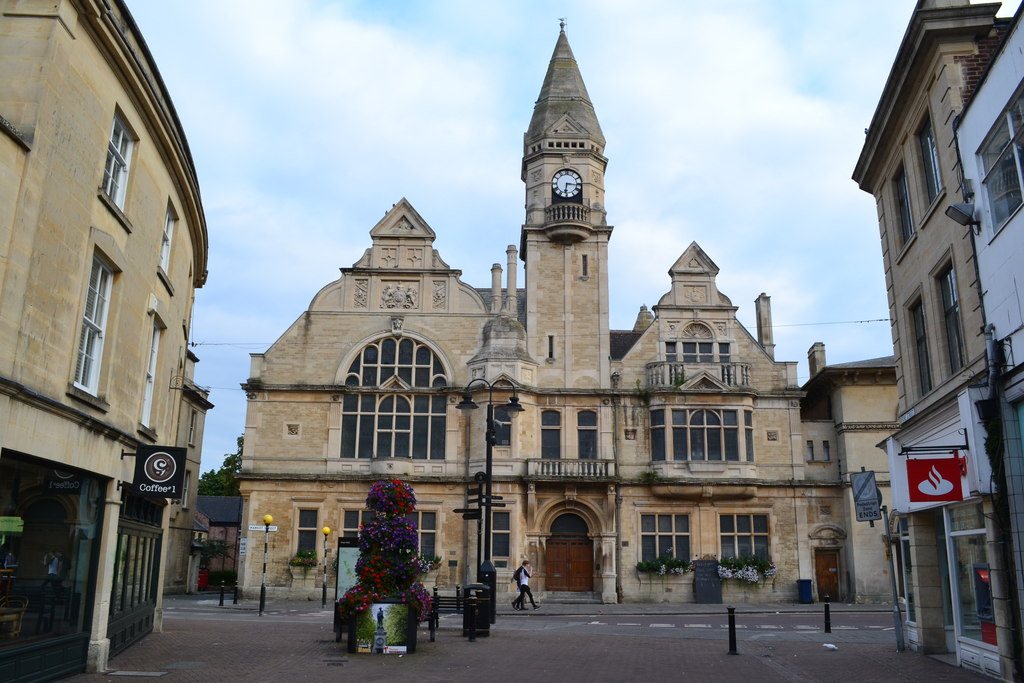
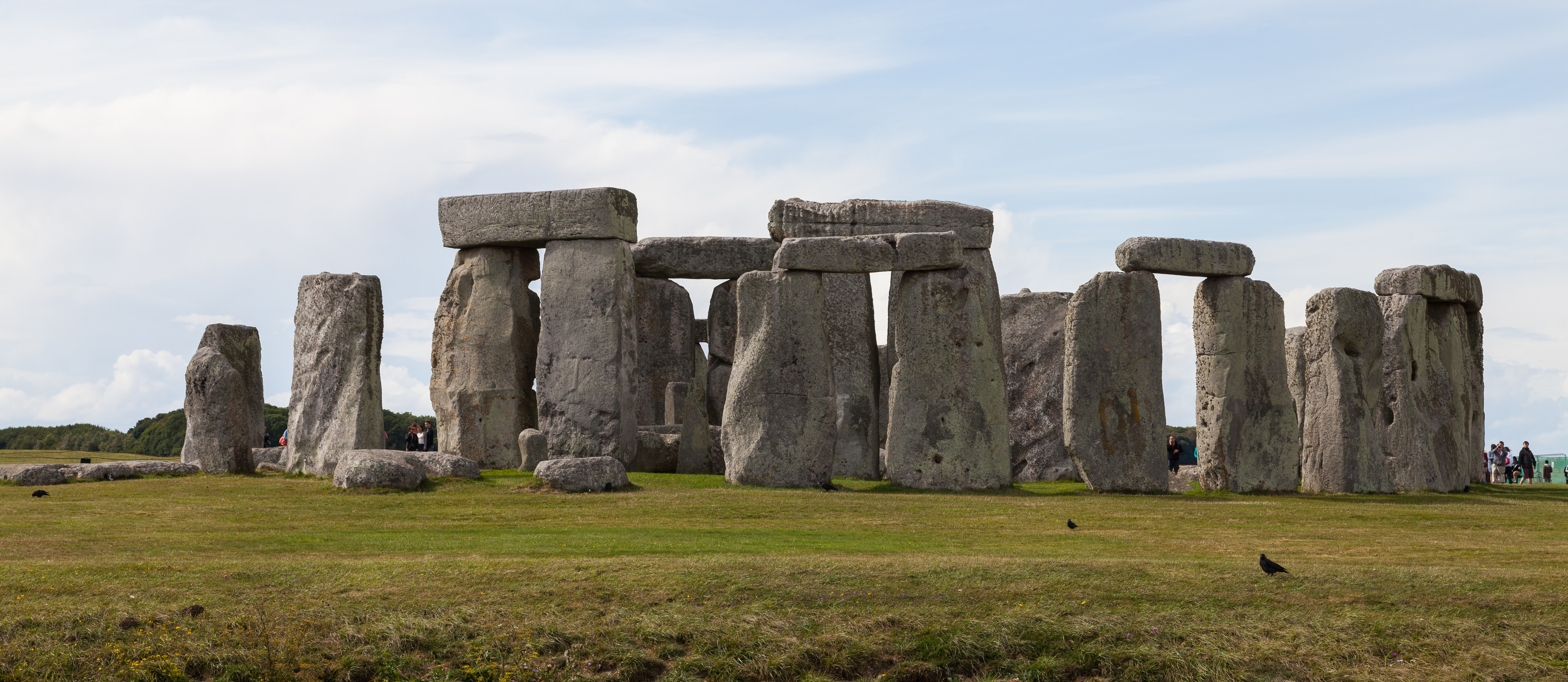
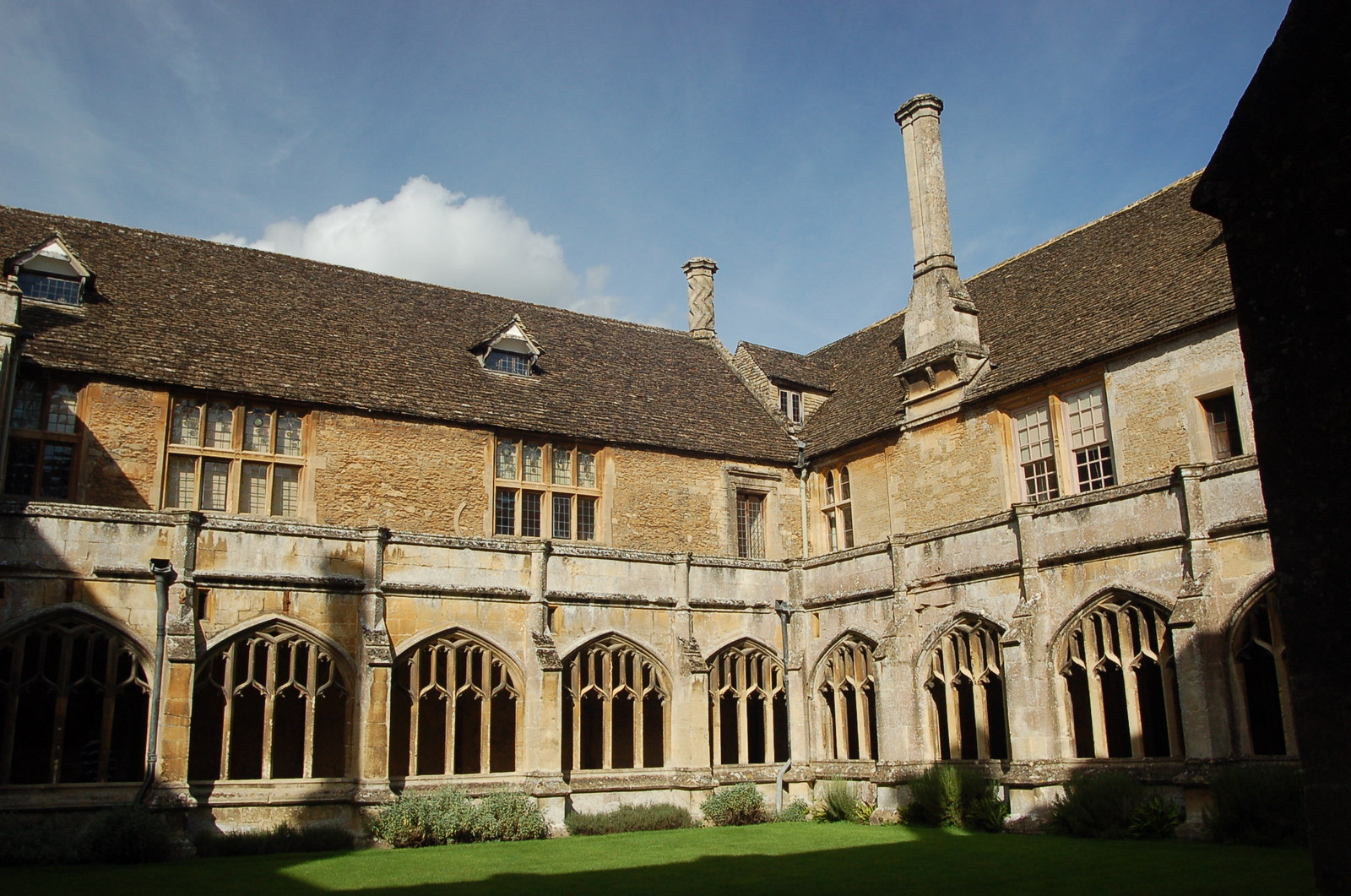
- Clockwise from top: Salisbury Cathedral; Trowbridge Town Hall; Lacock Abbey; Stonehenge; and Chippenham Market Place

- Coat of arms

- Shown within the ceremonial county of Wiltshire

- Location within England Location within the United Kingdom Location in Europe
- Coordinates: 51°21′07″N 1°58′41″W
- Sovereign state: United Kingdom
- Country: England
- Region: South West England
- County: Wiltshire
- Unitary Authority: 1 April 2009

Government
  - Type: Non-metropolitan district
  - Local Authority: Wiltshire Council
  - Council Leader: Ian Thorn

Population (2025)
  - Total: 526,392 (Ranked 11th)

Ethnicity (2021)
  - Ethnic groups: List: 94.3% White; 2.1% Asian; 1.7% Mixed; 1.1% Black; 0.7% other

Religion (2021)
  - Religion: List: 50.2% Christianity; 41.3% no religion; 0.7% Islam; 0.5% Hinduism; 0.5% Buddhism; 0.1% Sikhism; 0.1% Judaism; 0.6% other; 6.0% not stated
- Time zone: UTC+0 (Greenwich Mean Time)
- Postcode: SP, SN4-6, SN8-14, BA2, BA12-15, RG17
- Post town: Bath, Salisbury, Swindon and Reading
- Dialling code: 01249 and others
- ISO 3166 code: GB-WIL
- Police: Wiltshire Police
- Fire: Dorset & Wiltshire Fire and Rescue Service
- Ambulance: South Western
- Website: www.wiltshire.gov.uk

Wiltshire is a unitary authority area in the ceremonial county of Wiltshire, South West England. It was formed on 1 April 2009 following the abolition of Wiltshire County Council and the districts of Kennet, North Wiltshire, Salisbury, and West Wiltshire. These were replaced by a single governing body, Wiltshire Council, which is based at County Hall in Trowbridge. As of 2024, the Wiltshire unitary authority had a population of estimate 523,700. Salisbury is the most populous settlement and the only city within the unitary authority, with Trowbridge and Chippenham being the next largest settlements. The remaining part of the ceremonial county is the Borough of Swindon, which is administered by a separate unitary authority and has a population estimate of 243,875.

== History ==
Prior to 2009, the county comprised four administrative districts (Kennet, North Wiltshire, Salisbury, and West Wiltshire) alongside the Borough of Swindon, which had become a separate unitary authority in 1997. In April 2009, the four districts were abolished and replaced by Wiltshire Council, creating a single unitary authority for the entire county outside the Borough of Swindon.

== Main settlements ==
- Amesbury
- Bradford on Avon
- Calne
- Chippenham
- Corsham
- Cricklade
- Devizes
- Larkhill
- Ludgershall
- Malmesbury
- Marlborough
- Melksham
- Mere
- Royal Wootton Bassett
- Salisbury
- Tidworth
- Trowbridge
- Warminster
- Westbury
- Wilton

== Demographics ==
=== Ethnicity ===
The population of the ceremonial county of Wiltshire (district) was historically ethnically homogeneous, White British, but is now becoming less homogeneous, with the largest ethnic group, White British, constituting 90.1% of the population in the 2021 census. This proportion has consistently declined in each modern census, down from 96.2% in the 2001 census.

In the 2021 census, the ethnic composition of Wiltshire (district) comprised: 94.3% White, 2.1% Asian, 1.1% Black, 1.7% Mixed, and 0.7% Other.

- White (94.3%): English, Welsh, Scottish, Northern Irish or British (90.1%), Irish (0.5%), Gypsy or Irish Traveller (0.1%), Roma (0.1%), and Other White (3.6%).
- Asian (2.1%): Indian (0.6%), Pakistani (0.1%), Bangladeshi (0.2%), Chinese (0.3%), and Other Asian (1.0%).
- Black (1.1%): African (0.6%), Caribbean (0.3%), and Other Black (0.2%).
- Mixed (1.7%): White and Asian (0.5%), White and Black African (0.2%), White and Black Caribbean (0.5%), and Other Mixed or Multiple ethnic groups (0.5%).
- Other (0.7%): Arab (0.1%) and Any other ethnic group (0.6%).

Note: Sub-group totals may not sum exactly to the group total due to rounding.

Ethnic groups in Wiltshire (district)
Ethnic Group	2001 Census	2011 Census	2021 Census				
Ethnic Group	2001 Census	2011 Census	2021 Census	White	98.4%	96.6%	94.3%
Asian	0.5%	1.3%	2.1%				
Black	0.3%	0.7%	1.1%				
Mixed	0.7%	1.2%	1.7%				
Other	0.2%	0.2%	0.7%				

Note: The 2001 census figures for 'Asian' and 'Other' have been adjusted to reflect the 2011 reclassification of the Chinese ethnic group from 'Other' to 'Asian' to allow comparison across census years.

=== Religion ===
Religion in Wiltshire (district) (2021 United Kingdom census)
1. Christian (50.2%)
2. No religion (41.3%)
3. Muslim (0.70%)
4. Hindu (0.50%)
5. Buddhist (0.50%)
6. Sikh (0.10%)
7. Jewish (0.10%)
8. Other religion (0.60%)
9. Not stated (6.00%)

In the 2021 census, the religious composition of Wiltshire (district) comprised: 50.2% Christian, 41.3% No religion, 0.7% Muslim, 0.5% Hindu, 0.5% Buddhist, 0.5% Sikh, 0.1% Jewish, 0.6% Other religion, and 6.0% Not stated.

Religion in Wiltshire (district)
Religion	2001 Census	2011 Census	2021 Census				
Religion	2001 Census	2011 Census	2021 Census	Christian	76.6%	64.0%	50.2%
No religion	15.0%	26.5%	41.3%				
Muslim	0.3%	0.4%	0.7%				
Hindu	0.1%	0.3%	0.5%				
Buddhist	0.2%	0.3%	0.5%				
Sikh	0.1%	0.1%	0.1%				
Jewish	0.1%	0.1%	0.1%				
Other religion	0.3%	0.5%	0.6%				
Not stated	7.3%	7.7%	6.0%				
