= Staverton, Wiltshire =

Village in Wiltshire, England

Coordinates: 51.340°N 2.206°W

Staverton
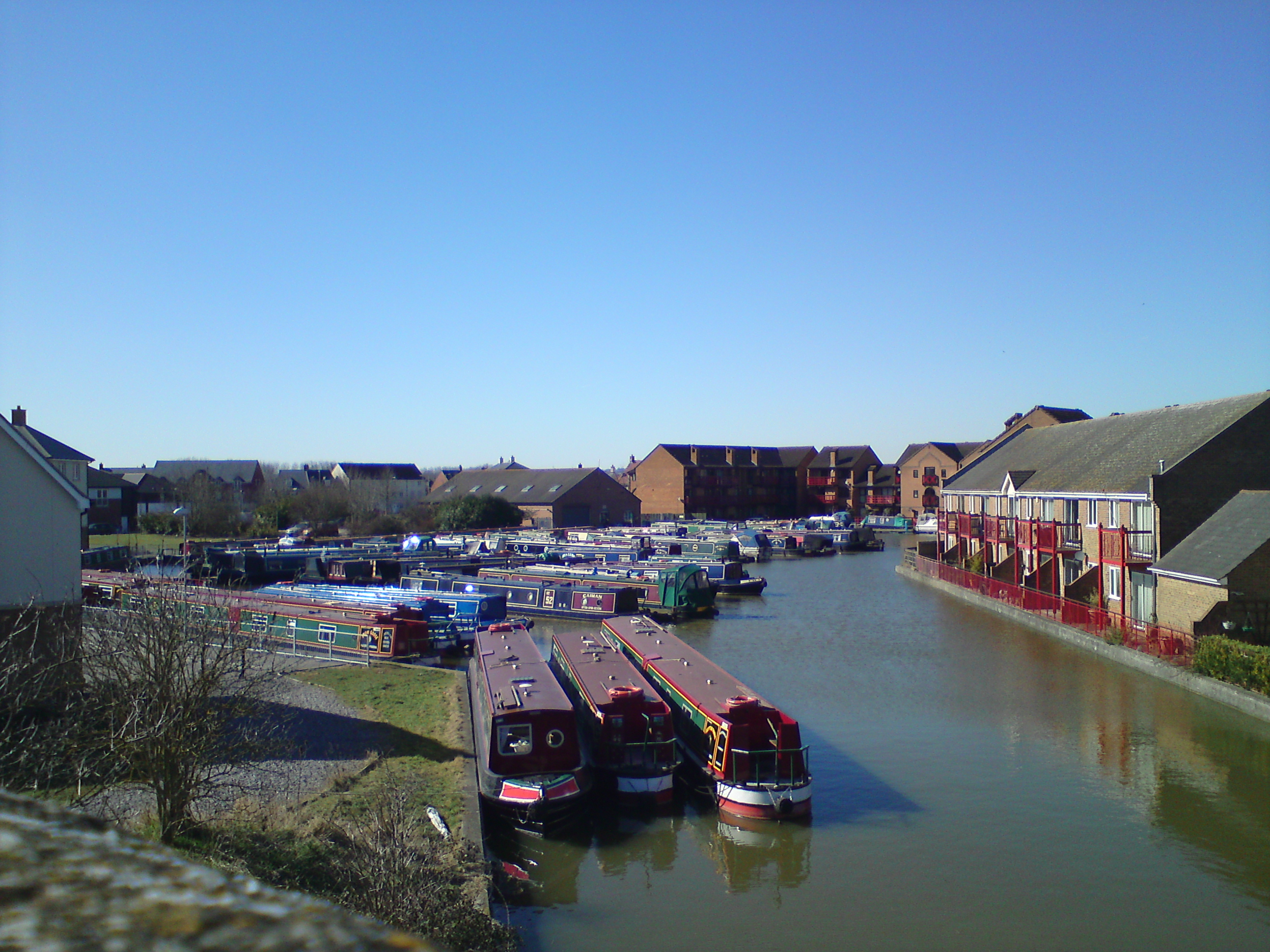
- Staverton Marina

- Location within Wiltshire
- Population: 1,868 (in 2011)
- OS grid reference: ST857601
- Civil parish: Staverton
- Unitary authority: Wiltshire
- Ceremonial county: Wiltshire
- Region: South West
- Country: England
- Sovereign state: United Kingdom
- Post town: Trowbridge
- Postcode district: BA14
- Dialling code: 01225
- Police: Wiltshire
- Fire: Dorset and Wiltshire
- Ambulance: South Western
- UK Parliament: Melksham and Devizes
- Website: Parish Council

Staverton is a village and civil parish in the west of the English county of Wiltshire, about 1.75 miles (2.82 km) north of the centre of Trowbridge and 3 miles (4.8 km) east of Bradford on Avon.

== History ==
Staverton developed near a crossing point of the Bristol Avon, on a road between Trowbridge and Holt. The road bridge may date from the 15th century and was rebuilt in the 18th, 19th and 20th centuries. The Avon forms the entire north and west boundary of the parish, while its tributary the Biss is the boundary in the southwest. The Kennet and Avon Canal, built in 1804, is the boundary to the south and southeast.

The early settlement was around a watermill and on the nearby higher ground near the church. The Old Bear Inn is from the early 19th century, and there are two rows of three-storey weavers' cottages from the 18th or 19th.

An Ordnance Survey map of 1958 shows only the school and roadside dwellings south of the village, between the railway and the canal. Later in the 20th century much housing was built here, followed by a marina for canal users, with waterside houses and apartments. These developments made the built-up area contiguous with Hilperton, on the other side of the canal. The population of the parish increased from 453 at the 2001 census to 1,868 in 2011.

=== Staverton Mill ===
There has been a mill on the River Avon at Staverton since at least the 11th century, when it was mentioned in Domesday Book. Over the centuries the mill has been used for corn and for fulling woollen cloth; a six-storey cloth mill was built in 1824–5, then in 1897 the site was sold to a predecessor of the Nestlé company for condensed milk production. Since 2007 the site has been home to a breakfast cereal factory, operated by subsidiary Cereal Partners UK, a joint venture between Nestlé and General Mills. The large, landmark chimney at the factory was removed in November 2011.

== Railway ==
The Wilts, Somerset and Weymouth Railway was opened through the parish on 2 September 1848, linking the Great Western Main Line at Thingley Junction with Trowbridge and Westbury, and forming a route from London to southwest England.

Near where the road passed over the line south of the village, a small station called Staverton Halt was opened on 15 October 1905, largely to serve workers at Staverton Mill. At the time this was a factory producing condensed milk for the Anglo-Swiss Condensed Milk Co. and a private siding to serve it was constructed in 1931, tankers being brought from Westbury after detachment from one of the Penzance to London milk trains.

A victim of the Beeching cuts, the halt closed on 16 April 1966 along with the three other stations between Chippenham and Trowbridge then still extant. Scheduled passenger services continued to use the line intermittently until 1978, after which time the line remained open to freight traffic and as a diversionary route. Regular passenger services were restored to the line in 1985.

== Religious sites ==
A chapel of ease at Staverton was recorded in the 14th century, belonging to the church of St James at Trowbridge. The chapel dedicated to St Paul was rebuilt and enlarged on the same site, above the Avon, in 1826; the style of the small limestone building with a low west tower is described as "naïve Tudor" by Orbach. It became a church in 1839 when Staverton was made a separate ecclesiastical parish. The porch was added in 1861.

Changes in 1954 brought St Mary's church at Hilperton Marsh into the parish, and the name of the parish became Staverton with Hilperton Marsh. The following year, a western part of Hilperton parish was transferred to Staverton. St Paul's closed in 2011 due to dwindling numbers and was offered for sale. St Mary's continues as the parish church, now part of the Canalside Benefice.

A Wesleyan Methodist chapel was built in 1824 and closed in 1985.

== Local government ==
The civil parish elects a parish council. It is in the area of Wiltshire Council unitary authority, which is responsible for all significant local government functions.

Staverton was a tithing of the ancient parish of Trowbridge, and became a separate civil parish in 1894.

== Amenities ==
Staverton Church of England Primary School was opened in 1996, replacing an 1880 National School building which is now used by an independent school called Emmaus School. Staverton School can accommodate 310 pupils aged between 4 and 11. Facilities include two hard surfaced play areas, a nature area, school library, ICT suite and a shared school field with a pavilion and tennis courts.

The village has a pub, the Old Bear Inn. Widbrook Wood is just outside the parish, on the other side of the Biss.
