= St James's Church, Trowbridge =

Coordinates: 51.3214°N 2.2076°W

St James's Church
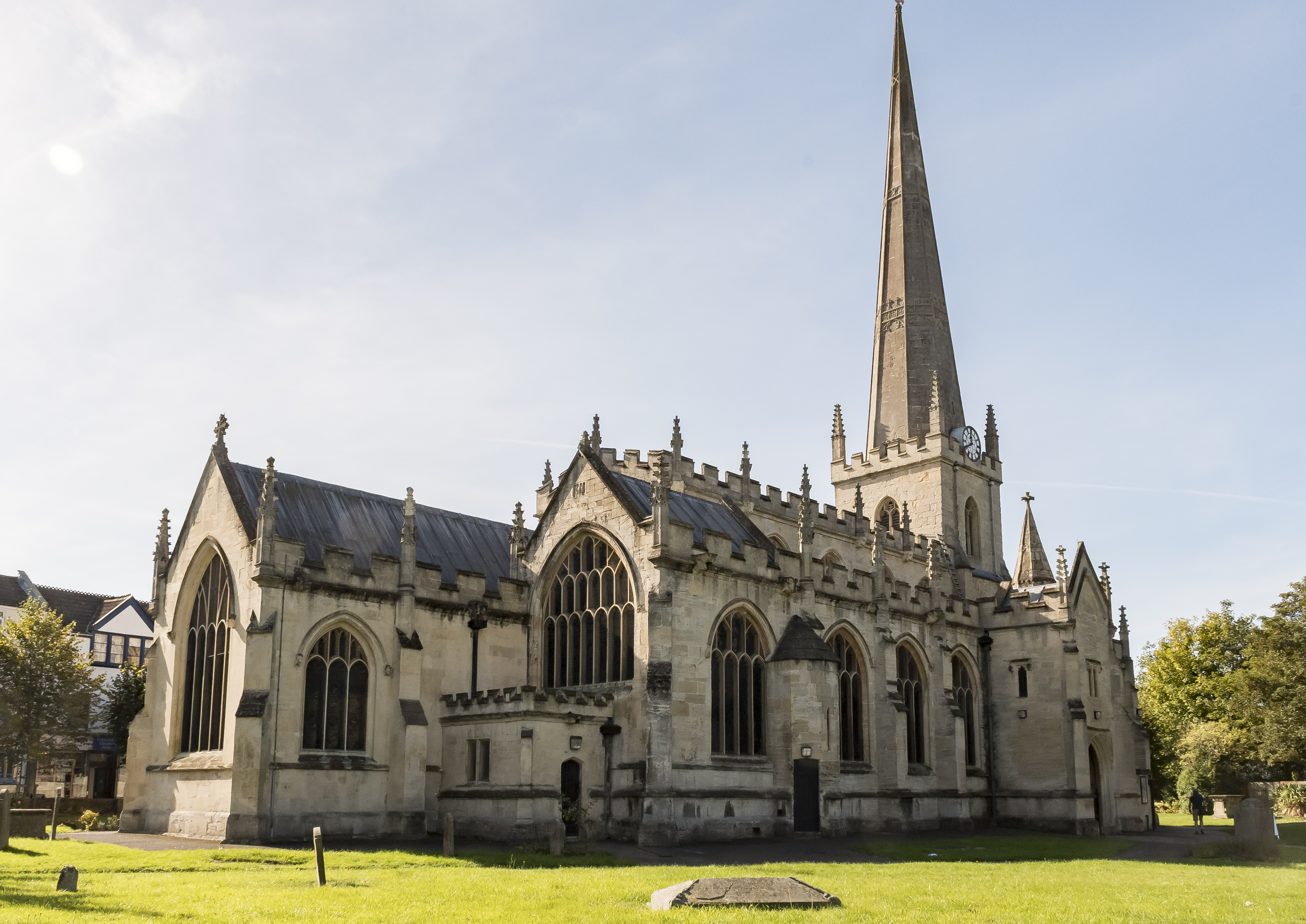
- St James's Church from the north-east

- Location in Wiltshire
- OS grid reference: ST 85641 58064
- Location: Trowbridge, Wiltshire
- Country: England
- Denomination: Anglican
- Website: www.stjamestrowbridge.co.uk

History
- Founded: 1200
- Dedication: James the Great

Architecture
- Functional status: Parish church
- Heritage designation: Grade I
- Designated: 1950
- Style: Perpendicular Gothic

Administration
- Province: Canterbury
- Diocese: Salisbury
- Archdeaconry: Wilts
- Deanery: Bradford
- Benefice: Trowbridge Saint James and Keevil
- Parish: Trowbridge

Listed Building – Grade I
- Reference no.: 1284401

St James's Church is the main Church of England parish church for the town of Trowbridge, Wiltshire, England. The 15th-century Grade I listed building is the town's most prominent landmark.

Those buried in the church include the poet George Crabbe, rector from 1814 to 1832, and in the churchyard the executed alleged-Luddite and Trade Union martyr Thomas Helliker.

== History ==
The first Saxon church in the town was most likely a wooden one on higher ground overlooking the River Biss, and was replaced by the first stone church. This church, of finely cut stone, was probably built in the mid 10th century.

When the 12th century castle was built, the church was contained within it and several Norman tombstone from the graveyard have been found. Some are in Trowbridge Museum while one is in the porch of the present church.

The parish church of St James was built outside the castle, around 1200, to serve the growing town. The earlier church was demolished and the site levelled. Alterations and additions were made in the 14th century and these comprise most of the earliest work visible today. A spire was also added to the tower and John of Gaunt, the lord of the manor, may have rebuilt the chancel. Around 1450, the nave and chapels were demolished and the church rebuilt on grander lines in the contemporary Perpendicular style. This probably took 30 years and made the church much as we see it today. Only the tower, spire and chancel of the old church remained.

In the time of Elizabeth I, the chancel was given an elaborate ribbed plaster ceiling and in 1540, John Leland described the church as 'lightsome and fair'. The 17th and 18th centuries saw much non-conformist activity in the town and the parish church suffered periods of neglect with many of the wealthier townspeople being Dissenters. This led to the building being in very bad condition by the mid 19th century with the spire out of the perpendicular and held together by iron bands, pieces of masonry falling off, and dangerous columns and arches.

The subsequent restoration was due to the energies of the Rev. J. D. Hastings and was completed in 1848. He also tidied up the churchyard and gave some of the land for the widening of Church Street. The graveyard was closed in 1856. In the church itself there are only 18 monuments that pre-date the restoration. Between 1926 and 1930 battlements, pinnacles and the top of the spire were repaired, while in 1953, the Duke chapel was restored to its original purpose as a Lady chapel.

The church was designated as Grade I listed in 1950. It suffered near disaster on two occasions in the late 20th century. In May 1986, the roof of the nave caught fire and there was substantial water and smoke damage; restoration costs were £200,000. On 25 January 1990, just after midday the town was hit by the Burns' Day Storm that blew off the top 20 feet of the spire, which fell through the previously undamaged part of the nave and ceiling. No-one was injured and the church was restored at a cost of £400,000.

The rectory was a 16th-century house with later additions, built in stone with two floors and an attic. It was demolished in 1962.

== Architecture ==
The entire building is in the Gothic style, predominately in the Perpendicular style, featuring large windows, Pinnacles and Battlements as well as a tall but slender spire; the second highest in Wiltshire, after Salisbury Cathedral. The spire reaches a height of 160 feet (49 metres). The church was extensively restored in the 19th century, but it retains some medieval architecture. This restoration involved rebuilding or renewing the chancel, south chapel, both arcades, clerestory and spire in the style of the original.

The tall nave features a large and wide arcade, a small clerestory and a highly decorative panelled plaster ceiling, complete with winged Cartouches. The nave aisles extend westwards to enclose all but the west wall of the tower. The tower features a fan vault below the ringing room, as does the north porch.

== Bells ==
The tower originally held a peal of eight bells, cast in 1800 by James Wells of Aldbourne, Wiltshire. In 1912, Llewellins & James of Bristol recast the two lightest bells and tenor bell, as well as re-hanging the peal. They returned in 1923 to augment the bells to ten, as memorials to the fallen of the Great War.

However, it became clear in the following ten years that rehanging and retuning was required again, but due to fundraising by the townspeople, the entire peal of bells was recast by John Taylor & Co of Loughborough in 1934. They were recast with additional metal to make Wiltshire's first and only peal of twelve bells, the tenor weighing 24 and a half long hundredweight and striking the note D. Due to the small size of the tower, the bells were rehung in a new cast iron frame in two tiers. Five of the bells are hung on the lower tier, and the remaining seven on the upper tier.

== Notable rectors ==
The poet George Crabbe was rector (under the patronage of the Duke of Rutland) from 1814 until his death in 1832.
