= William Roger Brown =

English mill-owner and philanthropist

Sir William Roger Brown (1831 – 14 May 1902), known as Roger Brown, was an English mill-owner and philanthropist, lord of the manor of Beckington in Somerset.

== Early life ==
He was born in 1831, the son of James Brown, a tea merchant, of Highfield, Hilperton (near Trowbridge, Wiltshire), and Bath. On leaving school Brown was taken into the business of his uncle, Samuel Elms Brown, at the Pole Barn cloth mills, Trowbridge. In 1857 he married his uncle’s daughter Sarah.

In 1859, Brown began to build for himself and his wife a new country house called Highfield at Hilperton. This continued to grow for many years.

== Career ==
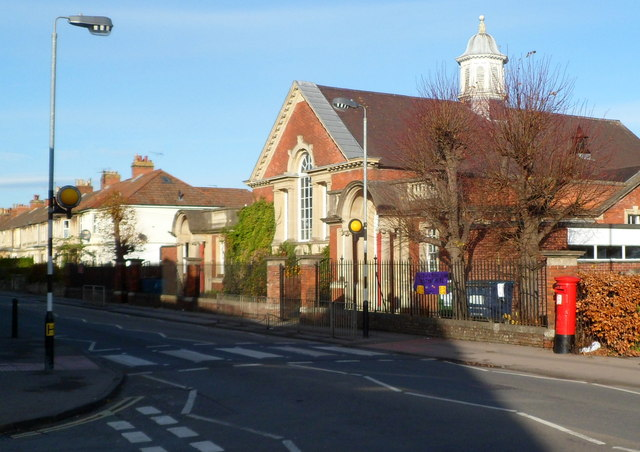
Newtown Primary School, Trowbridge

Brown made a large fortune as a clothier. In 1867 he was appointed as a Justice of the Peace for Wiltshire and later chaired the Trowbridge bench of magistrates. He bought land at Beckington which made him its lord of the manor. He was a leading figure in Wiltshire's textile industry and at one time employed a thousand people in the cloth mills of the Brown & Palmer company (reconstituted as Palmer & Mackay in 1877). One of the original members of Wiltshire County Council, he was commissioned as a deputy lieutenant for the county in 1898, and was appointed High Sheriff for 1898–99.

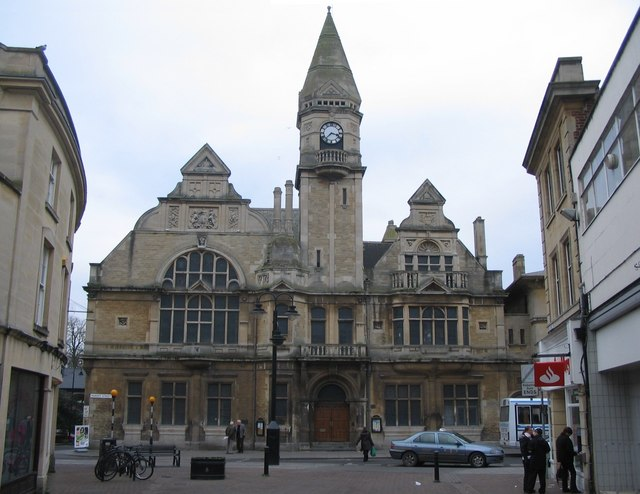
Trowbridge Town Hall

Brown provided the site for a new school in Newtown, Trowbridge, which opened in 1901; he is named on its foundation stone. Between 1887 and 1889 he also paid for the building of the Trowbridge Town Hall, at a cost of some £20,000 (equivalent to £2,126,541 in 2023) to celebrate the Golden Jubilee of Queen Victoria. During his lifetime, a marble bust of Brown by Edward Sheppard, inscribed to commemorate his donation, was placed on the staircase of the town hall.

In 1893, Victoria made Brown a knight bachelor, and in 1895 he received a grant of arms.

In politics Brown was a Liberal, and in religion he was a Congregationalist.

== Legacy ==
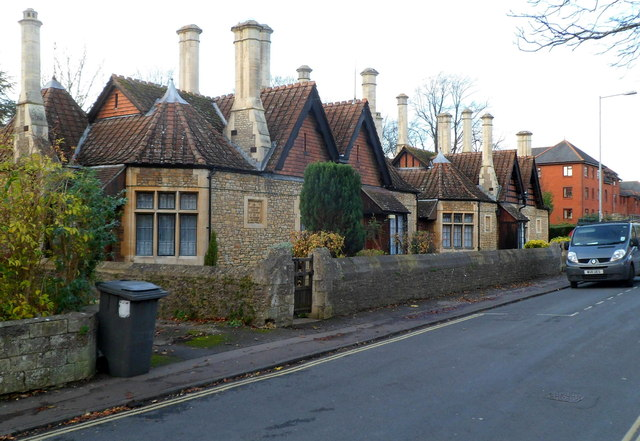
Lady Brown’s Cottages

Brown's wife died on 6 December 1899, and soon after he built and endowed two blocks of almshouse cottages in her memory, to house six widows. Known as Lady Brown's Cottage Homes, they still stand on Polebarn Road, Trowbridge, altered to make five dwellings. Pevsner describes their style as "deliberately rustic, many-chimneyed and many-gabled".

Brown died on 14 May 1902. He and his wife were buried in a grand mausoleum in Trowbridge cemetery. His estate was valued for probate at £425,137, equivalent to £43,238,190 in 2023, and in his will he left money to buy fuel for the deserving poor.

The mausoleum is a pink granite structure on a square base, with a round-headed doorway. In 2012, its bronze gates were stolen, and in 2021 the same fate befell its valuable bronze doors which had been locked in the cemetery chapel for safekeeping.
