= Thomas Helliker =

Thomas Helliker (sometimes spelled Hilliker) (23 March 1784 – 22 March 1803), known as the Trowbridge Martyr, was a figure in early English trade union history who was hanged, aged 19, for his alleged role in machine-breaking at a Wiltshire woollen mill. His conviction has been challenged as controversial and faulty, and he is now regarded as a victim of anti-Luddite sentiment.

== Arrest and trial ==
Helliker had been employed as a shearman's colt at a woollen mill owned by a Mr Naish at Semington, near Trowbridge in Wiltshire. As such he was close to the most highly skilled workers who stood to lose most from mechanisation and therefore were well-organised in resisting it.

The workers had organised an anti-machinery mill-burning riot that destroyed the mill on 22 July 1802 and Helliker was accused of waving a pistol at a night-watchman during this attack. Heath, the tenant of the mill, witnessed this attack and gave a description similar to Helliker's to a police officer, Read; furthermore, Helliker had been heard praising the attacks on the machines. He was arrested in Trowbridge on 3 August 1802. Heath later picked him out in an identification parade although Helliker was the only mill employee in the line-up and already known to him. He was taken before the magistrates and denied the offence, however the magistrate, Mr Jones told him

You have been recognised and it will go bad for you.

Despite Helliker having an alibi from his friend Joseph Warren, to the effect that they had both got drunk on the night in question and had locked themselves inside a house until the morning, he was charged and lodged in Salisbury gaol. Thomas Helliker was tried in Salisbury despite the fact that many people at the time believed his statements that he was innocent, and tried to get him to name the actual culprit. He refused to do so; Warren failed to attend the court to support the alibi, having been taken to Yorkshire by colleagues who had felt that he would not withstand questioning. The only evidence against Helliker was that of Heath's identification, although he had also been given £500, a very large sum at that time, as a reward. Helliker's counsel, a Mr Garrow, failed to undermine Heath's identification, and a newspaper report of the time said

The jury deliberated for about ten minutes, during which time Helliker was in great agitation. When at length they pronounced him guilty, he appeared as if relieved from a torturing suspense, and to assume a degree of fortitude to encounter his fate and which he retained when the sentence of death was pronounced. He is a good-looking youth, only nineteen years old. He is left for execution.

Helliker was hanged on his 19th birthday; his colleagues claimed his body and carried it across Salisbury Plain back to Trowbridge. On 22 March 2003, the anniversary of his hanging was marked by a ceremony by the side of his tomb, and it was then said that

He is an important figure in the town's history and I think it is important that it doesn't go without being marked.

== Final letter ==
A handwritten copy of the last letter written by Helliker (signed Hiliker) is on display at Trowbridge Museum. In 2010 it was selected as one of 100 objects in the BBC's A History of the World project, in partnership with the British Museum and 350 museums and institutions across the country.

== Tomb ==
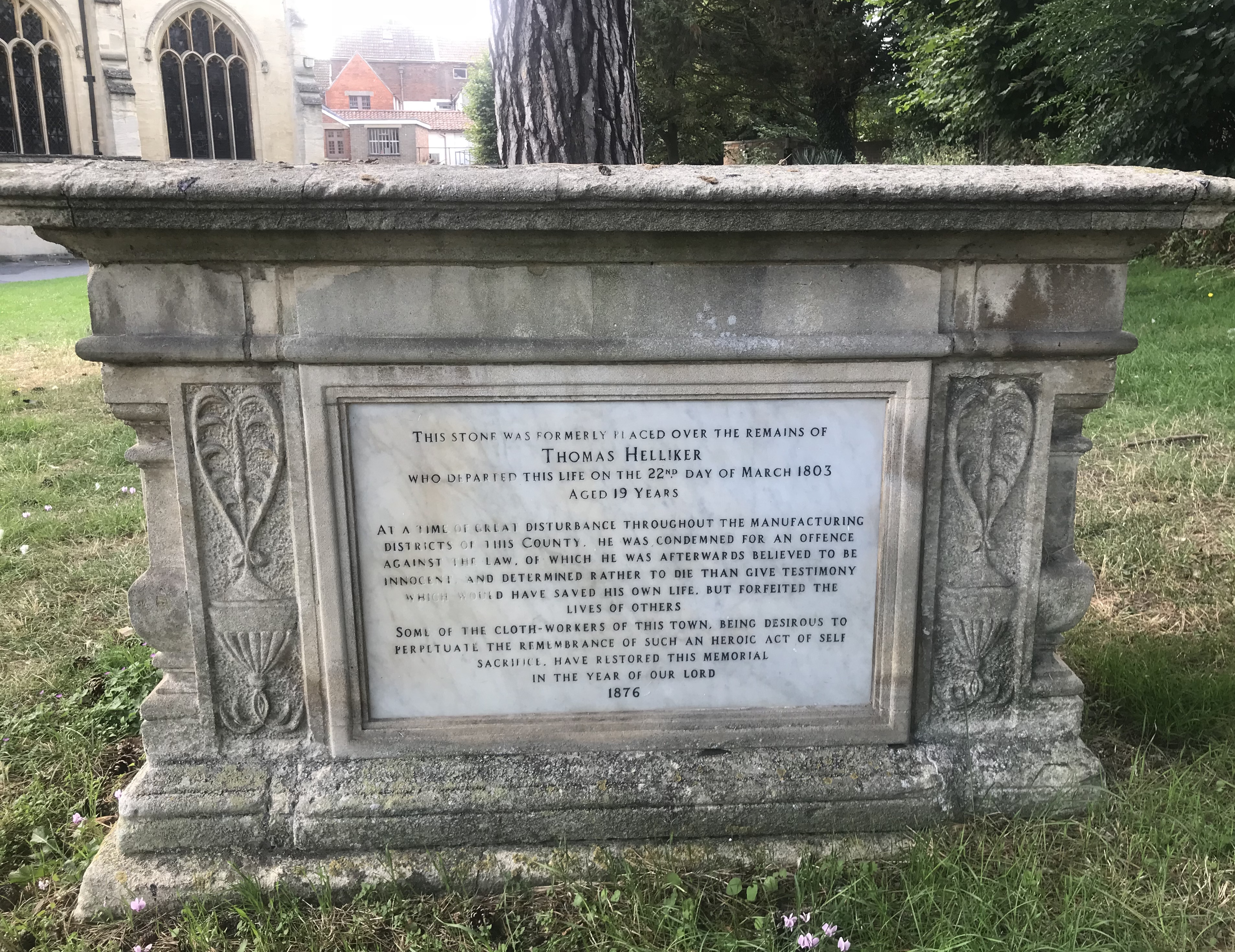
Thomas Helliker's tomb in St James' churchyard

Helliker's tomb is in the churchyard of St James's Church, Trowbridge, a short distance from the town centre.

Sacred to the memory of

Thomas Helliker
The thread of whose life was cut in the bloom of youth
He exchanged mortality for immortality March 22 1803 in the 19th year of his age.
The fatal catastrophe which led to this unfortunate event is too awful to describe. Suffice it say that he met his death with the greatest fortitude and resignation of mind. Considering his youth he may be said to have but few equals. He died a true penitent. Being very anxious in his last moments that others might take a timely warning and avoid evil company.

This tomb was erected at his earnest request by the cloth making factories of the counties of York Wilts and Somerset as a token of their love to him and veneration of his memory.

A second inscription was added later:

This tomb was formerly placed over the remains of
Thomas Helliker
At a time of great disturbance throughout the manufacturing towns of this county. He was condemned for an offence against the law of which he was afterwards believed to be innocent and determined to die rather than give testimony which would have saved his own life, but forfeited the lives of others.
Some of the cloth-workers of this town being so desirous to perpetuate the remembrance of such an heroic act of self sacrifice have restored this memorial in the year of our lord 1876.

== Notes and references ==
- Ponting, Kenneth (1971). The Woollen Industry of South-West England. Bath: Adam & Dart. ISBN 0-239-00064-1.
- Randall, Adrian (2002). Before the Luddites. Cambridge University Press. ISBN 0-521-89334-8.
