= Joanna Turner =

English religious evangelist (1732–1784)

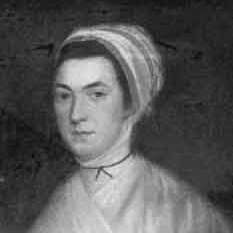
- Born: Joanna Cook; 1732
- Died: 24 December 1784 (aged 51–52); Trowbridge
- Occupation: evangelist
- Known for: introducing Methodism
- Spouse: Thomas Turner

Joanna Turner or Joanna Cook (1732 – 24 December 1784) was an English religious evangelist who brought Methodism to the town of Trowbridge, Wiltshire.

== Life ==
Turner was probably born in Trowbridge as she was baptised there in 1732 into the Church of England. Her parents were Honour (born Coles) and a clothier named John Cook. Her mother died when she was eight or nine, and at twelve she was sent to a boarding school where a cousin was already enrolled. Turner later noted that she thought the school was above her station. She enjoyed reading and other pastimes but she dwelt upon a crime she had committed: it was never discovered that she had stolen a shilling but her conscience troubled her. She burned the romances that she enjoyed and returned to her father who had now remarried. She and her stepmother did not get on.

She went to London, where she heard George Whitefield and the evangelist William Romaine. Romaine was at St Dunstan-in-the-West. She was fearful of damnation as she enjoyed the entertainment and the attention of men. She heard the Methodists in the south-west when she went to visit her cousin Elizabeth Johnson. In Trowbridge she established a religious society that met every Thursday. She would write letters to local ministers questioning their behaviour if they attended a ball and she would walk out with other followers to hear preachers. Her family decided that this was unacceptable and following an ultimatum she moved out of the family home. She had £500 and could earn some money by sewing.

On 9 February 1766, she married a local grocer and fellow believer. For ten years she worked at Thomas Turner's shop. By 20 November 1771, a new chapel was built that was mostly funded by her and her husband. Their ambitions also included another chapel in her husband's home town of Tisbury, Wiltshire. This was completed by 1782 and Joanna moved there during its construction.

== Death and legacy ==
Turner died in Trowbridge in 1784. She is credited as the person who brought Methodism to the town. In 1787 her friend Mary Wells edited her diaries and letter into a book, titled "The Triumph of Faith Over the World, the Flesh and the Devil...".

Her pocket watch was donated in 2009 to Trowbridge museum. The watch is silver and tortoiseshell, and inside is written her name and the whole of the Lord's Prayer and Alexander Pope's Universal Prayer.
