= The Shires Shopping Centre =

Shopping centre in Trowbridge, England

Coordinates: 51.320°N 2.210°W

The Shires Shopping Centre is the central, covered shopping centre in Trowbridge, Wiltshire, England. The centre incorporates the county town's main museum and has a 1,000-space car park. As of 2009, approximately 120,000 shoppers visited the centre each week.

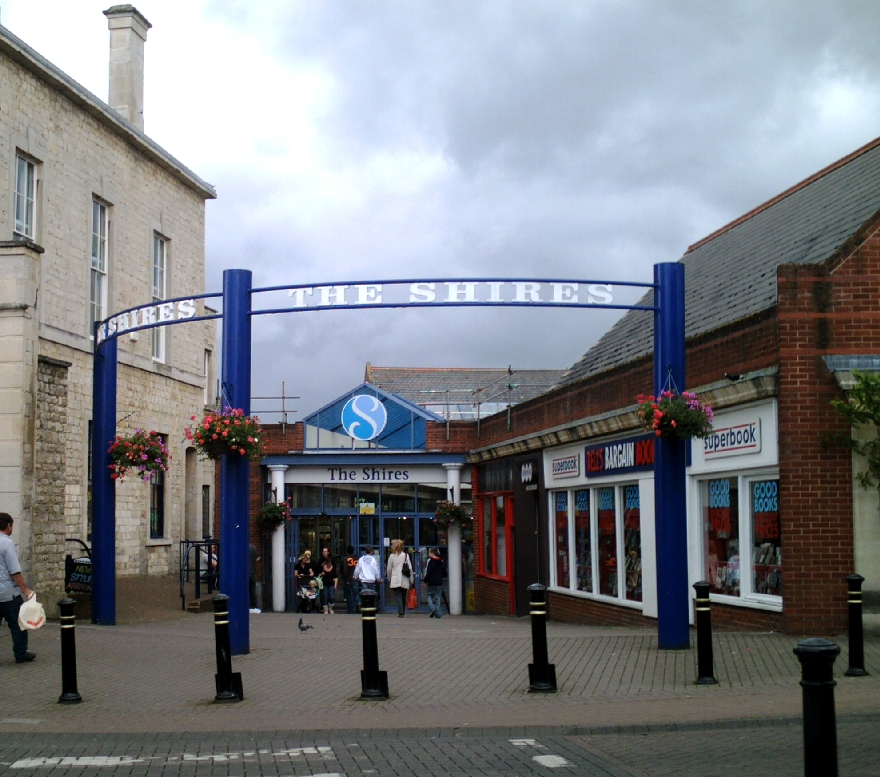
Castle Street entrance to The Shires

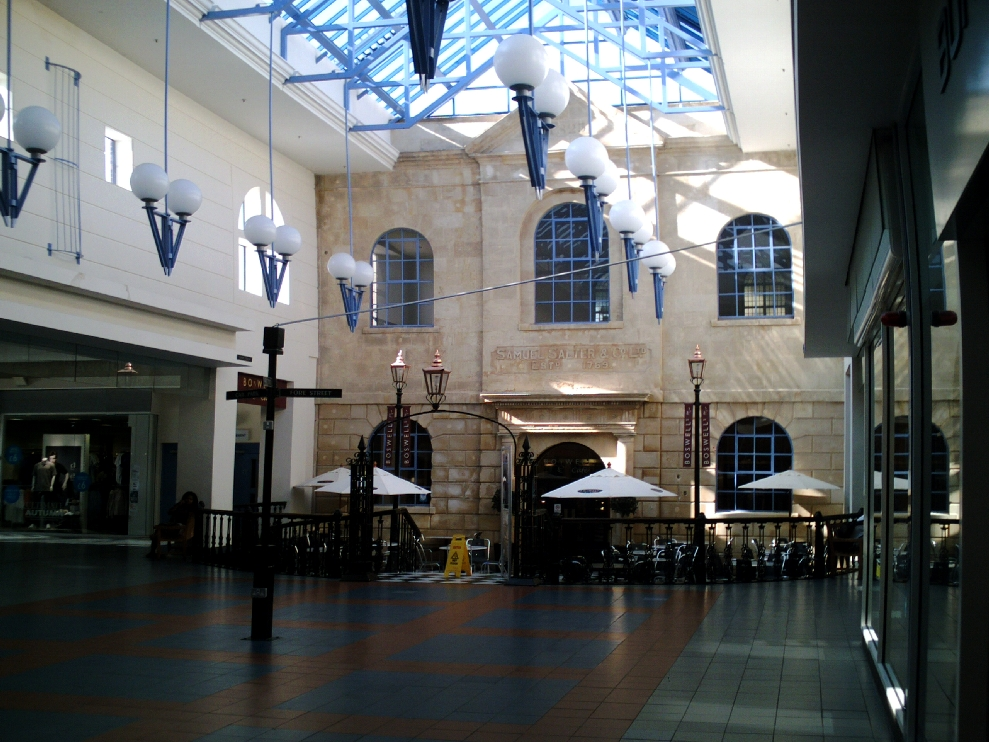
Central piazza of the Shires, with Salter's Home Mill at the rear

== History ==
Excavations before the construction of the centre revealed multiple artifacts of Saxon occupation, including a church and graveyard dated to c. 850 AD, and remnants of the medieval castle; the centre's name evokes this period of Anglo-Saxon England when during the Heptarchy major affairs such as justice began to be administered by meetings at shire-level.

Most of the land occupied by the centre was used in Trowbridge's woollen milling industry between the 14th and 19th centuries. Centrally within it was the last operating such facility, Salter's Home Mill, which closed in 1982 and much of which is occupied by Trowbridge Museum which opened along with the centre in 1990. The Shires was Trowbridge's second shopping centre, after Castle Place which opened in 1973.

The Shires was voted Wiltshire's best shopping centre for the six years to 2009 by readers of a local newspaper.

== Occupiers ==
Stores at the centre include: Bonmarché, F. Hinds, CEX, Halifax, Iceland, Peacocks, One Beyond and Superdrug.

== Shires Gateway ==
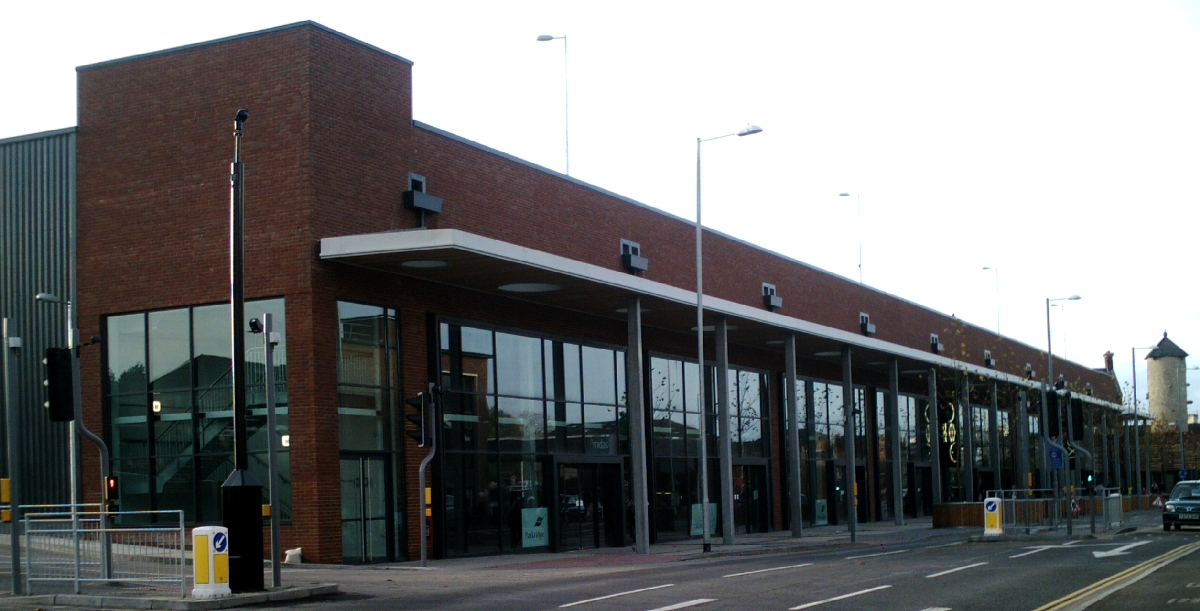
Shires Gateway

This 2009 addition, built simultaneously with waterside housing and cafés, introduced fashion retailers Next and New Look, along with footwear retailer Brantano.

Although its colloquial name is the Shires Gateway, its on-building name is the Gateway Trowbridge.

Outline planning permission for the development was granted by West Wiltshire District Council in 2007 for the development of a site on Bythesea Road, to be named "The Shires Gateway". Having published the scheme and consulted affected businesses, the body agreed to the developer's intention to provide:

"...not only much needed retail but will also see a new pedestrian street and public courtyard linking Bythesea Road and Stallard Street with boutique shops and cafés on the ground level and offices and apartments above."
