= Trowbridge Cottage Hospital =

Hospital in Wiltshire, England

Coordinates: 51.3245°N 2.2109°W

Trowbridge Cottage Hospital, was founded in 1870, and opened in The Halve in Trowbridge in 1886. In 1895, the hospital had ten beds. It was later known as Trowbridge District Hospital, and was demolished in the 1960s. It has been replaced with Trowbridge Community Hospital.

== Notable staff ==
The nursing department was run by a succession of five matrons who were recommended by Eva Luckes, Matron of The London Hospital between 1901 and 1910. All five matrons had trained under Luckes at The London.

- Florence Saich (1872– ), matron between 1901 and 1902. Trained between 1895 and 1897.
- Ann Maria Tubby (1871– ), matron between 1902 and 1906. Trained between 1898 and 1900. Became matron of The Rouse Memorial Hospital, Newmarket after she left Trowbridge.
- Eleanor Rayner (1867–1949), matron between 1906 and 1907. Trained between 1896 and 1899. Was later matron of Yeovil Hospital.
- Anna Smith (1875– ), matron between 1907 and 1908. Trained between 1900 and 1902.
- Catherine Bridson (1873– ), matron between 1908 and 1910. Trained between 1901 and 1903.
