= Airsprung =

British manufacturer of beds and upholstery

- Industry: Furniture
- Founded: 1965
- Headquarters: Trowbridge, Wiltshire, England
- Products: Beds, mattresses, furniture
- Parent: Airsprung Group plc
- Website: airsprung-group.co.uk

Airsprung is a British brand of beds and other furniture, headquartered in Trowbridge, Wiltshire and run by Airsprung Group plc.

== History ==
A mattress factory, Chapmans of Trowbridge, was founded in 1871 in Trowbridge, the county town of Wiltshire, and began using the Airsprung brand name in the 1930s or 1940s. Airsprung Limited was founded in 1965. By 1987, the company was the UK's second-largest manufacturer of beds.

In 1988 the company built a factory in South Yorkshire to make pine furniture.

In May 2026, Airsprung Group plc and Airsprung Furniture Ltd went into administration.

=== Ownership ===
Airsprung Group was floated on the London Stock Exchange, on the Over the Counter Market, on 22 November 1976 with shares selling for 27p. At this point, the company was the UK's largest manufacturer of bunk beds, and the UK's sixth-largest manufacturer of beds, with 5.8% of the UK market in 1975. The company's turnover in 1975 was £5.7m, with sales of £7.3m expected for 1976. The company made £553,000 in profit in 1975.

On 16 December 1982 it bought the Slumberland Ltd bed manufacturer for £2.25m; Slumberland at the time was turning over around £8m, but had suffered a £1m loss in 1981.

The company joined the Unlisted Securities Market (USM) in June 1986. By 1987, the company was turning over £24m.

The company's shares traded on the Alternative Investment Market (AIM) from 1991 until 16 December 2011, when the shares were acquired by Portnard Limited, a Jersey company.

== Structure ==
The company's headquarters and factory is on the B3106 in the north of Trowbridge. As of 2018, the company had revenue of £40m and around 500 employees.

== Products ==
- Beds
- Furniture
- Mattresses
- Storage-drawer divans
- Upholstery
