= Widbrook Wood =

Coordinates: 51.335°N 2.214°W

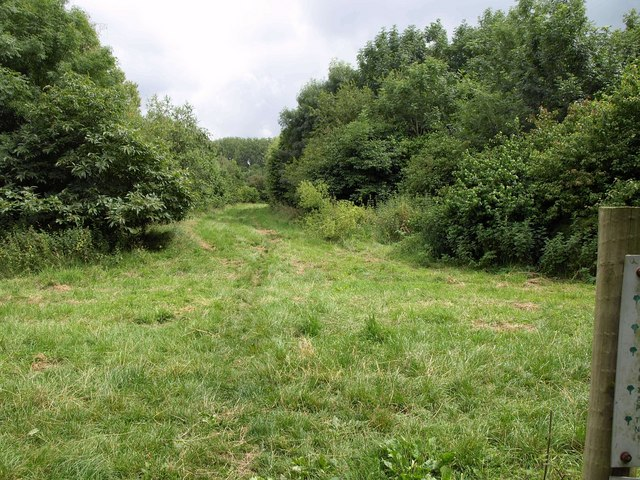
Widbrook Wood

Widbrook Wood is a small forest to the north of Trowbridge and to the south-east of Bradford on Avon, in Wiltshire, England, growing in the valley of the Bristol Avon.

It is made up of a mixture of deciduous and evergreen trees and several types of fruit tree. Planted in late 2000 for conservation reasons it is an important haven for wildlife, especially many birds. It is bordered on the south by the Kennet and Avon Canal, and to the north by the Avon. The River Biss flows through the south-eastern section of the woods, and the Widbrook, from which it takes its name, flows through the west.
