= County Hall, Trowbridge =

Building in Trowbridge, Wiltshire, England

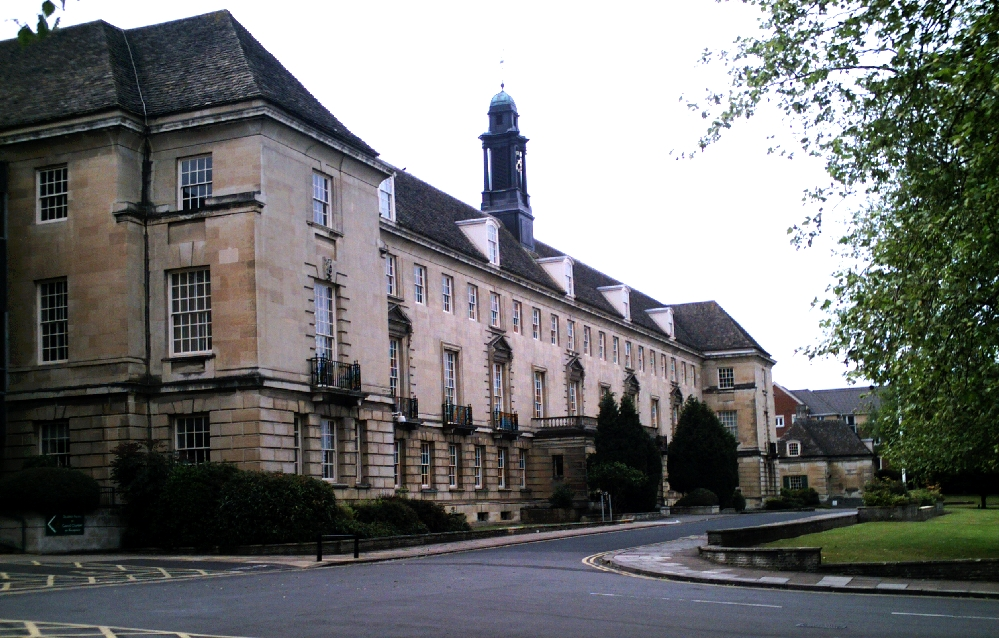
- County Hall

- Location within Wiltshire

General information
- Architectural style: Neo-Georgian style
- Location: Bythesea Road, Trowbridge, BA14 8JQ, United Kingdom
- Coordinates: 51.3171°N 2.2106°W
- Completed: 1940

Design and construction
- Architect: Philip Hepworth

County Hall is a municipal building in Bythesea Road, Trowbridge, Wiltshire, England, completed in 1940. It is the headquarters of Wiltshire Council.

== History ==
In the 19th century the judicial functions of the county were discharged at Devizes Assize Court in the Summer and at Salisbury Assize Court in the Lent. Following the implementation of the Local Government Act 1888, which established county councils in every county, there was a need to find a meeting place for Wiltshire County Council, and the Victoria County History infers that Trowbridge was chosen by virtue of its railway connections. The County Council acquired Arlington House in The Parade, Trowbridge in 1896; subsequent extensions included a block of offices on land behind the building, completed in 1900, and a block of offices adjacent to the building completed in 1913.

After deciding that the facilities at Arlington House and the adjacent properties were inadequate for their needs, council leaders decided to procure a new purpose-built building; the site they selected in Bythesea Road had previously been occupied by the Trowbridge Town football club. The new building, which was designed by Philip Hepworth in the Neo-Georgian style, was completed in 1940. The design has a symmetrical main frontage with thirteen bays facing onto Bythesea Road, the end bays slightly projected forward; the central section features a three-bay portico in antis with Doric order columns; there is a prominent window, framed by an aedicule, on the first floor and a wooden lantern containing a clock at roof level. Internally, the principal room was the council chamber which was polygon-shaped and jutted out to the rear of the main building.

During the Second World War, following concerns that County Hall would be a potential landmark for German aircraft, it was covered in camouflage nets. An extension to a design by Alec French & Partners was built to the south east of the main building and completed in 1974.

Following the merger of the former non-metropolitan districts of Kennet, North Wiltshire, Salisbury and West Wiltshire in April 2009, a new unitary authority known as Wiltshire Council adopted County Hall as its headquarters. In 2011, following an application from the county council, English Heritage decided not to list County Hall as the building did not meet the criteria for listing post-1945 buildings. The building was extensively refurbished by Kier Group at a cost of £22 million, to a design by Stride Treglown, in 2012. The refurbishment works involved the creation of a new link block to the 1970s extension; it also involved covering over the internal courtyard within the extension with an ETFE roof, so creating a new cafe and exhibition area.

== Public facilities ==
County Hall has the main office of Wiltshire Council's registration service, and parts of the building are used for ceremonies such as marriage and civil partnership. The building also houses the town's public library.
