= Trowbridge Town Hall =

Municipal building in Trowbridge, Wiltshire, England

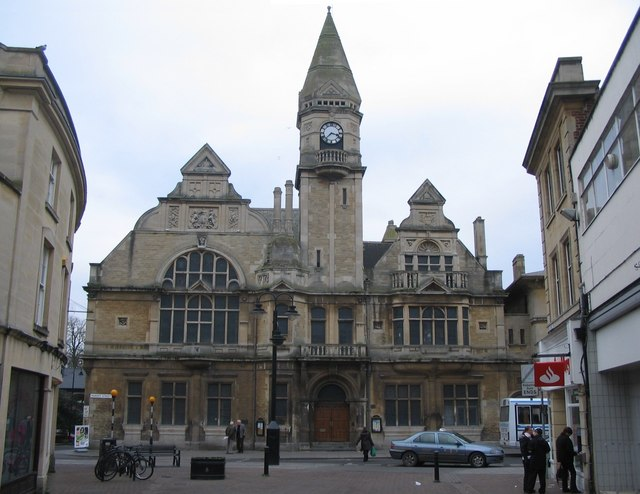
- Trowbridge Town Hall

- Shown in Wiltshire
- 51.3201°N 2.2068°W
- Location: Market Street, Trowbridge

History
- Built: 1889

Site notes
- Architect: Alfred Samuel Goodridge
- Architectural style: Jacobethan style

Listed Building – Grade II
- Official name: Town Hall
- Designated: 26 November 1976
- Reference no.: 1364209

Trowbridge Town Hall is a municipal building in Market Street, Trowbridge, Wiltshire, England. The town hall, which was the headquarters of Trowbridge Urban District Council, is a Grade II listed building.

== History ==
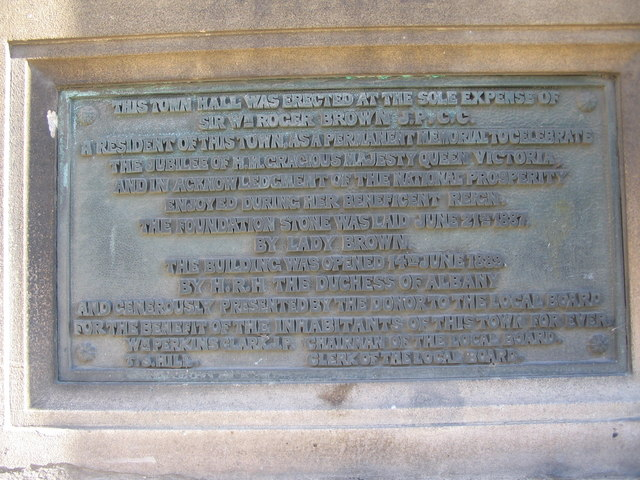
Plaque on the left of the doorway to the town hall

After significant population growth, largely associated with the cloth industry, a local board of health was established in Trowbridge in 1864. In the 1880s, the local board decided that the town needed a municipal building, and a wealthy cloth merchant, Sir William Roger Brown, offered to pay for it to celebrate the Golden Jubilee of Queen Victoria. The site the board acquired was then occupied by a large private house known as "The Limes".

The foundation stone for the new building was laid by Mrs Brown on 21 June 1887, when she declared:

"In the name of God the Father, God the Son and God the Holy Ghost, I declare this stone well and truly laid, that on it a Town Hall may be erected for the benefit of the inhabitants of Trowbridge, as a memorial of the blessings vouchsafed to us, the people of England, during the fifty years of Her Majesty’s reign, completed on this day. God Save the Queen!"

The new building was designed by Alfred Samuel Goodridge of Bath in the Jacobethan style, built in ashlar stone at a cost of £20,000, and was opened by the Duchess of Albany on 14 June 1889. The design involved an asymmetrical main frontage with three bays facing onto Market Street; the central bay featured an arched doorway flanked by brackets supporting a balustrade; there was a pair of mullion windows on the first floor and a tall Italianate style clock tower with a spire above. (The clock, of 1888, was provided by J. W. Benson Ltd.) In the left hand bay there was a giant round headed window with tracery on the first floor and a shaped gable above, while to the right there was a large oriel window with a shaped gable above. Internally, the principal rooms were the courtroom, which was used as a venue for petty sessions, the council chamber and the ballroom. The building was also equipped with police cells for people facing trial and an area to the rear of the town hall was landscaped to create a "Sensory Garden".

On 6 August 1889, soon after the creation of Wiltshire County Council, one of its earliest meetings took place at Trowbridge Town Hall.

In 1894, the parish of Trowbridge became an urban district, with the town hall as its headquarters, and in November 1917 King George V and Queen Mary visited the town hall on a visit to the area. The ballroom was used for local dances and musical events, and in the 1960s performers appearing there included the rock bands Rod Stewart and the Soul Agents, in December 1964, The Who, in April 1965, and Small Faces in August 1965.

The building continued to serve as the headquarters of the urban district council for much of the 20th century, but ceased to be the local seat of government after the enlarged West Wiltshire District Council was formed in new offices at Bradley Road in 1974. After 1974, the town hall belonged to West Wiltshire District Council, and then from 2009 to its successor Wiltshire Council, which considered disposing of it. It continued to be used as a magistrates' court until 2003 and was also used as the venue for coroners' inquests into the deaths of military personnel.

== 21st century ==
In 2011, a group of residents formed the Trowbridge Town Hall Trust to help restore the building; the organisation was registered as a charity in 2014. Since then, the building has been used for exhibitions and community events.

In 2021, Wiltshire Council was awarded a grant from the UK government's Future High Streets Fund to develop a range of projects in Trowbridge including the refurbishment of the town hall and, in 2023, work was initiated to restore the structure and to remodel the interior allowing better use of the rooms and the provision of accessibility improvements. Following completion of the works, the Trowbridge Town Hall Trust were granted a 125-year lease of the building and it was officially re-opened on 25 October 2025.

Works of art in the town hall include a bust by Edward Sheppard depicting the benefactor, Sir William Roger Brown, as well as portrait of him by an unknown artist.
