= Trowbridge =

County town of Wiltshire, England

Coordinates: 51°19′12″N 2°12′29″W

- County town
- Trowbridge Town Hall, seen from Fore Street

- Location within Wiltshire
- Population: 37,169 (2021 Census)
- OS grid reference: ST856579
- Civil parish: Trowbridge
- Unitary authority: Wiltshire
- Ceremonial county: Wiltshire
- Region: South West
- Country: England
- Sovereign state: United Kingdom
- Post town: TROWBRIDGE
- Postcode district: BA14
- Dialling code: 01225
- Police: Wiltshire
- Fire: Dorset and Wiltshire
- Ambulance: South Western
- UK Parliament: South West Wiltshire
- Website: Town Council

Trowbridge (/ˈtroʊbrɪdʒ/ TROH-brij) is the county town of Wiltshire, England, situated on the River Biss in the west of the county, close to the border with Somerset. The town lies 8 miles (13 km) south-east of Bath, 31 miles (50 km) south-west of Swindon and 20 miles (32 km) south-east of Bristol. The parish had a population of 37,169 in 2021.

Long a market town, the Kennet and Avon canal to the north of Trowbridge played an instrumental part in the town's development, as it allowed coal to be transported from the Somerset Coalfield; this marked the advent of steam-powered manufacturing in woollen cloth mills. The town was the foremost centre of woollen cloth production in south-west England in the late 18th and early 19th centuries, by which time it held the nickname "The Manchester of the West".

The parish encompasses the settlements of Longfield, Lower Studley, Upper Studley, Studley Green and Trowle Common.

== History ==
=== Toponymy ===
The origin of the name Trowbridge is uncertain; one source claims derivation from treow-brycg, meaning "Tree Bridge," referring to the first bridge over the Biss, while another states the true meaning is the bridge by Trowle, the name of a hamlet and a common to the west of the town. On John Speed's map of Wiltshire (1611), the name is spelt Trubridge.

=== Early history ===
Written records and architectural ruins began marking Trowbridge's existence as a village in the 10th century. In the 1086 Domesday Book, the village of Straburg, as Trowbridge was then known, was recorded as having 24 households, well-endowed with land, particularly arable ploughlands, and rendering 8 pounds sterling to its feudal lord a year. Its feudal lord was an Anglo-Saxon named Brictric, the largest landowner in Wiltshire.

=== Castle ===
The first mention of Trowbridge Castle was in 1139, when it was besieged. By the 14th century, it was no longer in military use, and by the 16th century, only ruins remained. The castle is thought to have been a motte-and-bailey castle, and its influence can still be seen in the town today. Fore Street follows the path of the castle ditch, and the town has Castle Street and the Castle Place Shopping Centre.

The Castle was likely built by Humphrey I de Bohun, whose family dominated the town for over a hundred years.

The most notable member of the family was Henry de Bohun, born around 1176, who became lord of the manor when he was about 15 years of age. It was he who began to shape the medieval town. In 1200, he obtained a market charter, arguably the earliest for a town in Wiltshire, and one of the earliest in England. His officials were to lay out burgage plots for traders, artisans, and shopkeepers. The outline of these plots can still be seen today in the footprints of some of the present shops in Fore Street.

Within Trowbridge Castle was a 10th-century Anglo-Saxon church. Henry de Bohun converted it to secular use and built a new church outside the Castle, the first St James's Church. The Romanesque architecture of the period can be seen in the base of the tower of the present-day church, below the subsequently added spire.

In 1200, Henry de Bohun was created Earl of Hereford by King John. Like other barons, Henry was later threatened by King John and his caput of Trowbridge was taken from him. Henry then joined with the other barons to oppose John's arbitrary rule and forced him to seal Magna Carta (the Great Charter) at Runnymede. He was elected as one of the 25 enforcers of the charter. Some years after Runnymede, Henry regained control of Trowbridge.

=== Woollen cloth industry ===
Trowbridge developed as a centre for woollen cloth production from the 14th century. Thus, before the start of the Tudor period, the towns of south-west Wiltshire stood out from the rest of the county with all the signs of increasing wealth and prosperity during the period of trade recovery led by exports begun under Yorkist Edward IV and, still more, during expansion under Henry VII, when England's annual woollen exports increased from some 60,000 to some 80,000 cloths of assize.

During the 17th century, the production of woollen cloth became increasingly industrialised. However, workers resisted mechanisation in traditional trades; there were riots in 1785 and 1792, and again in the era of Luddism (1811–1816) owing to the introduction of the flying shuttle. Thomas Helliker, a shearman's apprentice, became one of the martyrs of the Industrial Revolution in 1803 when he was hanged at Fisherton Jail, Salisbury. Nevertheless, at one point in 1820, Trowbridge's production was on such a scale that it was described as the "Manchester of the West." It had over 20 woollen cloth producing factories, making it comparable to northern industrial towns such as Rochdale.

The woollen cloth industry declined in the late 19th century with the advent of ring-spinning, and this decline continued throughout the 20th century, although Trowbridge's West of England cloth maintained a reputation for excellent quality until the end. The last mill, Salter's Home Mill, closed in 1982 and is now the home of Boswell's Café and Trowbridge Museum and Art Gallery, integrated into the Shires Shopping Centre. There are also working looms on display. Clark's Mill is now home to offices; straddling the nearby River Biss is the "Handle House," formerly used for drying and storage of teazles used to raise the nap of cloth. This is one of the few such buildings still known to exist in the United Kingdom.

Buildings associated with the textile industry

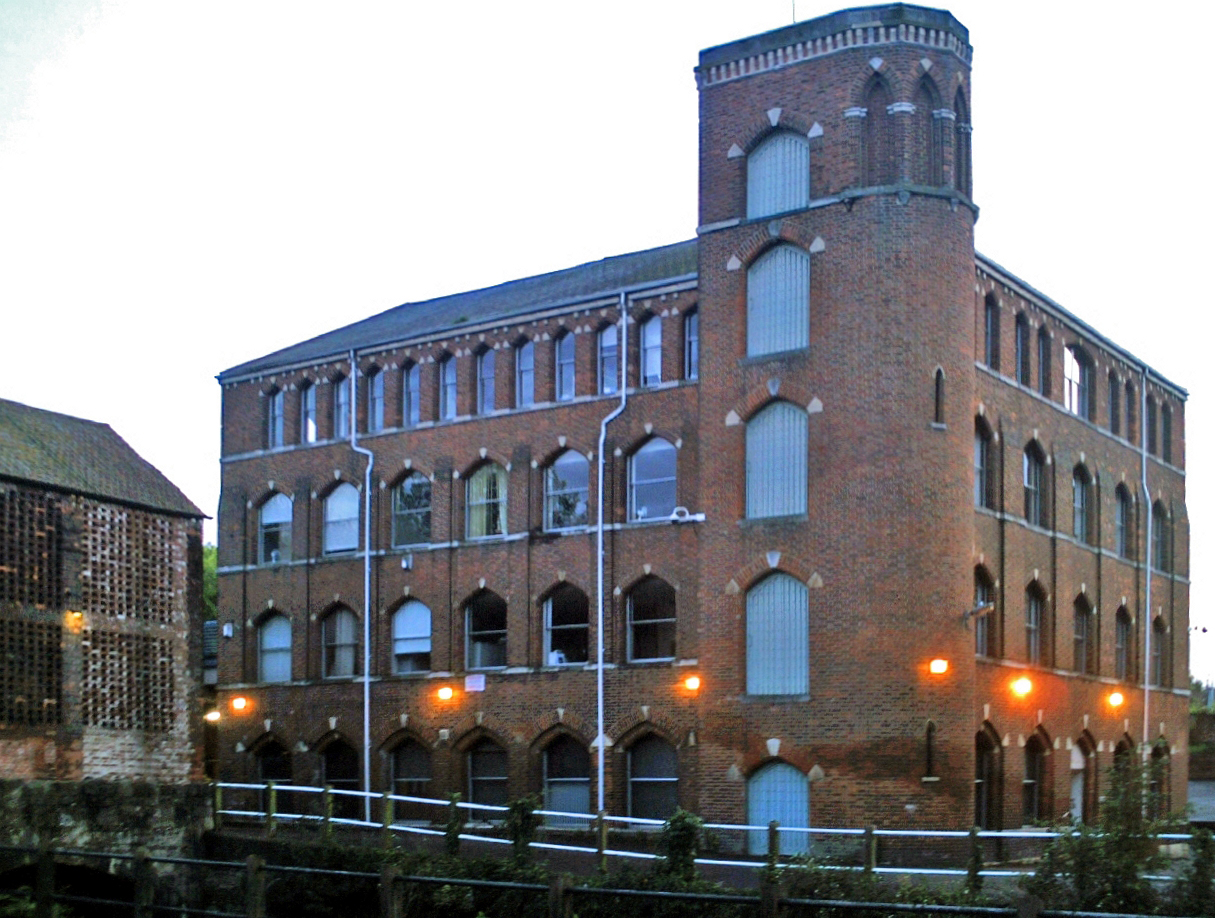
Clark's Mill from Wicker Hill

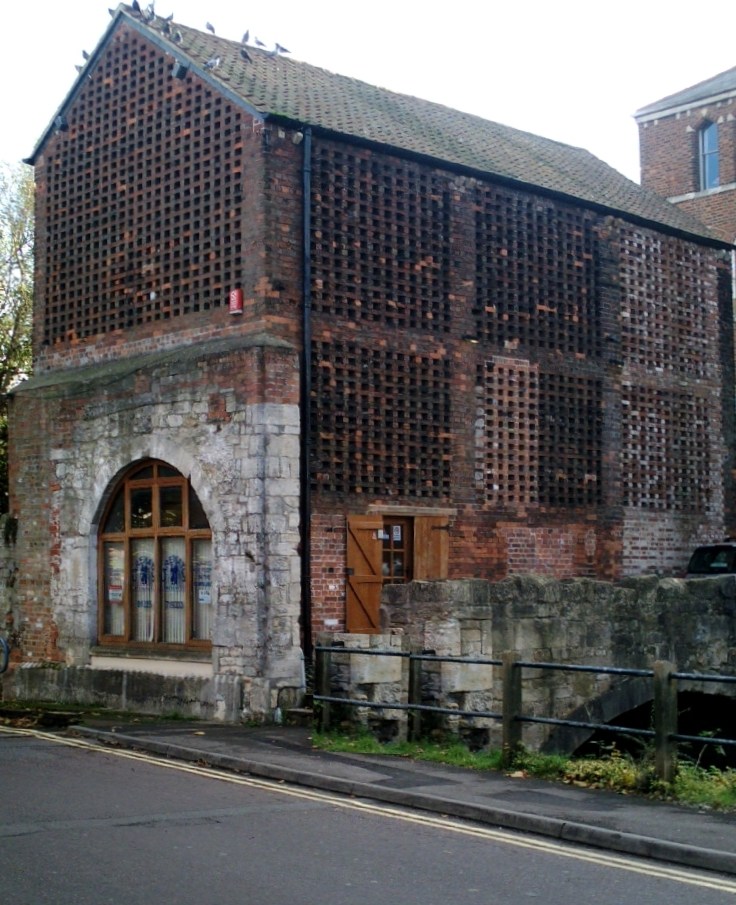
Handle House adjacent to Clark's Mill

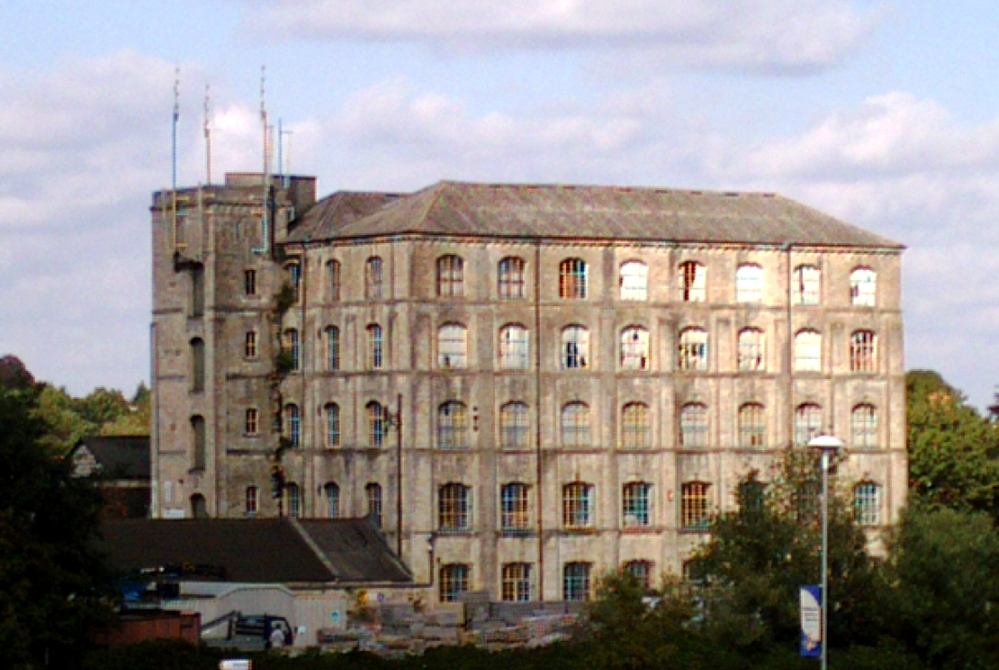
Ashton Mill, once a major employer

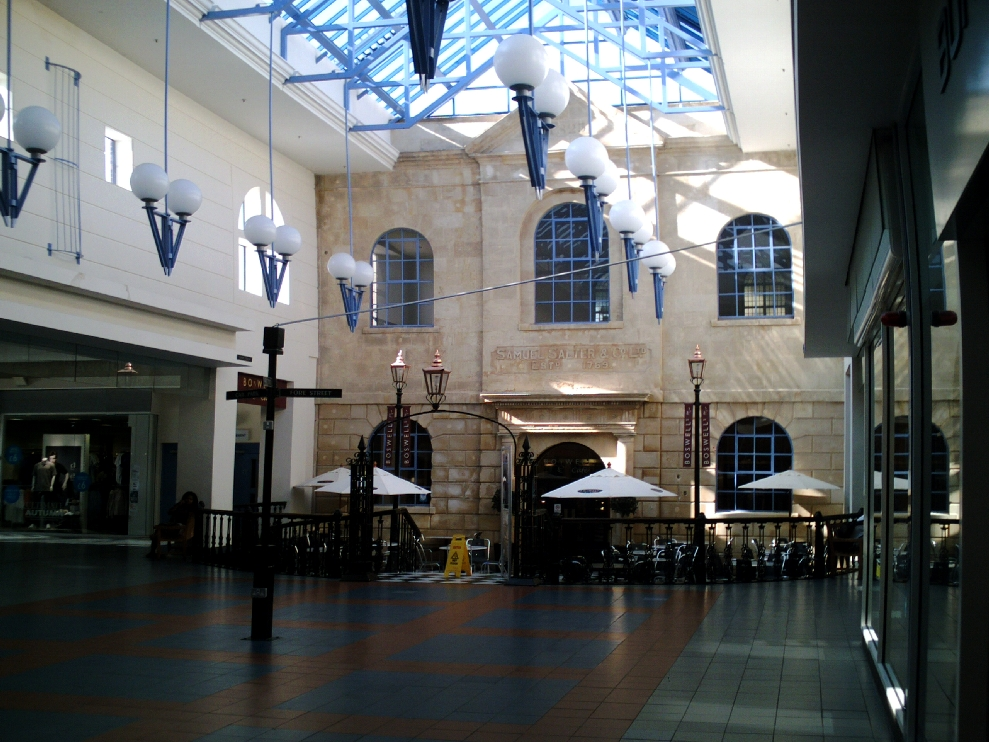
Salter's Mill, now the centrepiece of the Shires Shopping Centre

=== 1800s to present ===
In its place, a bedding industry developed, initially using wool cast off from the mills; the company now known as Airsprung Furniture Group was started in the town in the 1870s. Food production also developed in the town when Abraham Bowyer started his business in 1805. Eventually, as Pork Farms Bowyers, it became one of the largest employers in the town until its closure in April 2008, when production moved to the Shaftesbury and Nottingham factories.

The town became the county town of Wiltshire in 1889 when Wiltshire County Council was formed and sought a place which representatives from Swindon and Salisbury, among others, could reach and return home from in one day. Trowbridge fulfilled this criterion by its railway connections and thus was chosen as the county town, further reinforced by the construction of County Hall in 1939.

The brewing company Ushers of Trowbridge opened in 1824 and had a brewery in a central part of the town. This was shut in 2000 following several changes of ownership, and its equipment was sold to North Korea, where it forms the core of the Taedonggang brewery, just outside Pyongyang.

=== 21st-century redevelopment ===
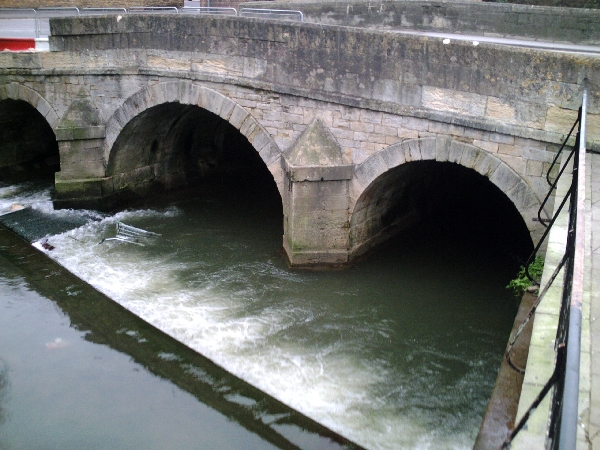
The River Biss flowing under the Town Bridge, renovated in 2007

Since 2002, plans have been in place to redevelop significant town centre sites. Trowbridge Community Area Future (TCAF) produced a Community Area Plan in 2004 to guide future development.

In the early 1990s, the supermarket chain Tesco moved from St Stephen's Place to a site adjoining the A361 on County Way, and their former site remained dormant for a decade. The building was demolished, but a pile of rubble, nicknamed 'Mount Crushmore' by local media, remained. Legal & General acquired the land, and construction of St Stephen's Place Leisure Park began in 2012. A seven-screen Odeon cinema and Nando's restaurant opened in October 2013. A Premier Inn and food outlets, including Frankie and Benny's and Prezzo, followed in 2014.

The former Usher's brewery site has also undergone redevelopment over several years, with Newland Homes building town centre flats incorporating the frontage of the Usher's building.

In April 2009, building work started on one of the town's biggest brownfield sites, the former Usher's bottling plant. This was developed into a Sainsbury's supermarket, a public square and housing.

== Architecture ==
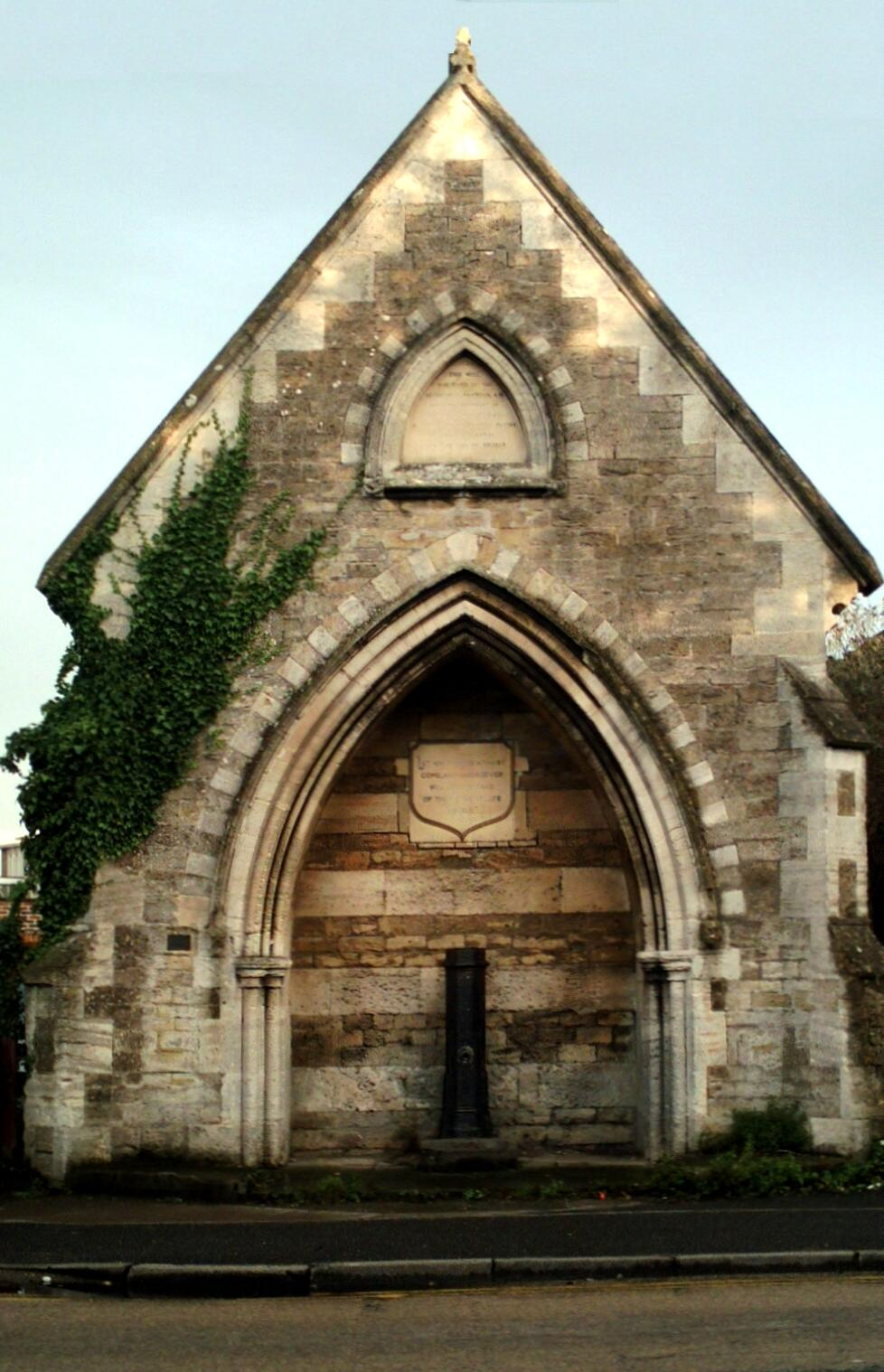
'Studley Pump' drinking well, Frome Road; Victorian in origin, restored in 1977

Trowbridge has much architectural interest, including many old buildings associated with the textile industry, and the Newtown conservation area, a protected zone of mostly Victorian houses. The town has six Grade I listed buildings: St James's Church, Lovemead House on Roundstone Street, and numbers 46, 64, 68 and 70 Fore Street. The latter is referred to more commonly as Parade House.

Trowbridge Town Hall is in Market Street, opposite the entrance to the now-pedestrianised Fore Street. This three-storey building with an Italianate clock-tower was presented to the town's residents by a local mill-owner, Sir William Roger Brown, in 1889 to celebrate Queen Victoria's golden jubilee. The building was the seat of local government until 1974 and subsequently accommodated the magistrates' courts until 2003. More recently, it has been used for exhibitions and community events.

== Governance ==
The Town Council is the first tier of local government and comprises 21 councillors.

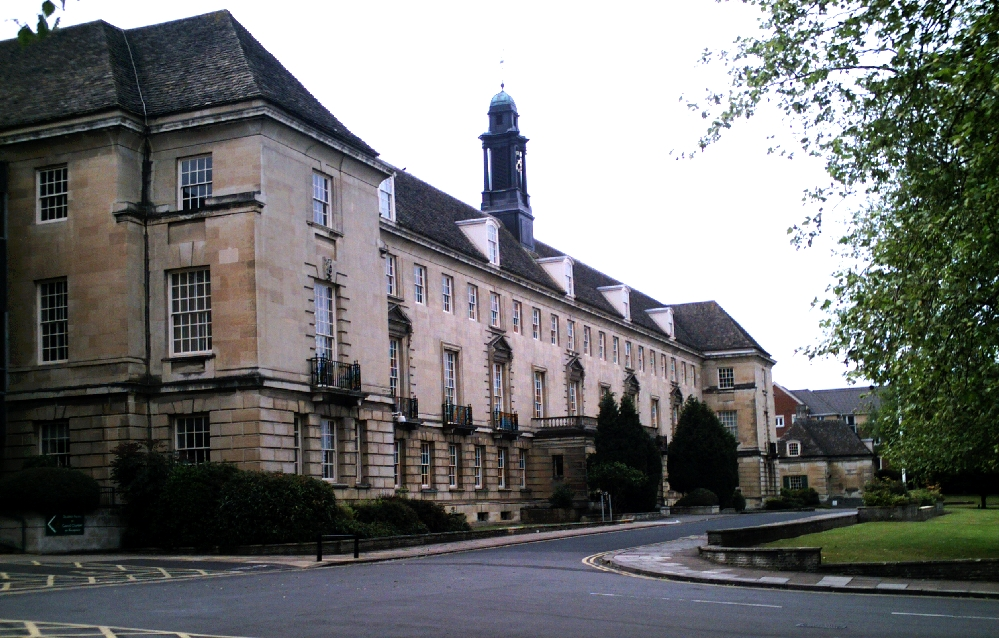
County Hall in Bythesea Road

County Hall in Bythesea Road, Trowbridge, is the administrative centre for Wiltshire Council, a unitary authority created in April 2009 which replaced West Wiltshire District Council and the former Wiltshire County Council, which had been headquartered at County Hall since 1940. Trowbridge civil parish is divided into seven electoral divisions, each electing one member of Wiltshire Council.

Trowbridge is within the South West Wiltshire parliamentary constituency, which has been represented by Andrew Murrison (Conservative) since its formation in 2010.

== Geography ==
The River Biss enters Trowbridge from the southeast, flowing through Biss Meadows, managed as a country park. In the north of the town, the Lambrok Stream joins it, then continues north to join the River Avon near Staverton.

Northwest of the town, part of the Avon Green Belt prevents expansion towards Bradford-on-Avon. To the north and northwest, housing areas in Staverton and Hilperton parishes are contiguous with Trowbridge's urban area; however, to the south and southeast, the villages of Southwick, North Bradley, Yarnbrook and West Ashton maintain their separate identities.

== Demography ==
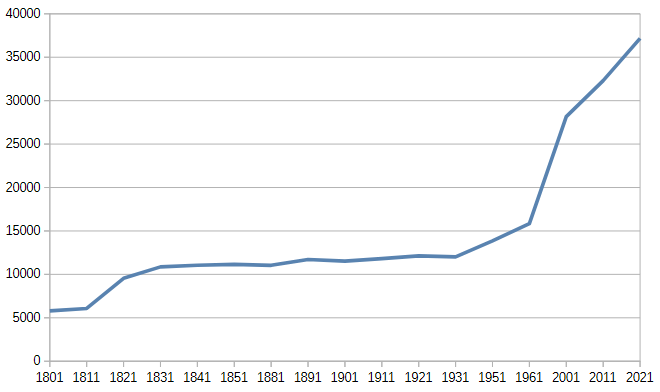
Changes in Trowbridge's population 1801–2021

The first official census of 1801 showed Trowbridge having 5,799 inhabitants, which rose sharply to 9,545 in 1821. The population rose by less than 50% in the 130 years to 1951, compared to a considerably larger increase in the country's population. From 1951 to 2011, the population increased by 133%. Coinciding with this increase, a considerable conversion of arable fields and some riverside meadows to residential estates occurred.

Census Population of Trowbridge (parish)
Year	1801	1811	1821	1831	1841	1851	1881	1891	
Population	5,799	6,075	9,545	10,863	11,050	11,148	11,040	11,717	
Year	1901	1911	1921	1931	1951	1961	2001	2011	2021
Population	11,526	11,815	12,130	12,011	13,859	15,844	28,163	32,304	37,169

According to the census in 2011, the ethnic breakdown of the population of Trowbridge parish was: White 94.8%, Mixed/multiple ethnic groups 1.9%, Asian/Asian British 1.5%, Black/African/Caribbean/Black British 1.1%, Other ethnic group 0.8%. The built-up area's population, including Staverton and Hilperton parishes, was 39,409 in 2011 and was estimated to have grown to 43,719 by mid-2020.

In 2018, the Office for National Statistics estimated the larger "community area" population to be 45,822, making Trowbridge the most populous area in Wiltshire (excluding Swindon), with Chippenham close behind in second place and Salisbury third. At the 2021 Census, the "built-up area" population – consisting of Trowbridge, Staverton and Hilperton parishes – was 43,744.

== Transport ==
Trowbridge railway station was opened in 1848 on the Westbury–Bradford-on-Avon section of the Wilts, Somerset and Weymouth Railway. Today, this line forms part of both the Wessex Main Line (Bristol–Westbury–Southampton) and the Heart of Wessex Line (Bristol–Westbury–Weymouth), while the original route to Melksham, Chippenham and Swindon is used by the TransWilts service. Other services from Trowbridge join the Great Western Main Line at Bath and Chippenham, or the Reading to Taunton line at Westbury.

Trowbridge is about 18 miles (29 km) from junction 17 of the M4 motorway at Chippenham. The A361 runs through the town, connecting it to Swindon to the north-east and Barnstaple to the south-west, while the north–south A350 primary route to Poole passes close to the town.

The nearest airport is Bristol Airport, 30 miles (48 km) west.

== Education ==
Primary schools in the town include Bellefield Primary School, The Grove Primary School, Holbrook Primary School, Oasis Academy Longmeadow, Paxcroft Primary School, The Mead Community Primary School, Newtown Primary School, Castle Mead School, St John's Catholic Primary School, Studley Green Primary School and Walwayne Court Primary School. Children may also attend schools in adjacent parishes, including North Bradley CE Primary School, Hilperton CE Primary School and Staverton CE Primary School.

Secondary schools in Trowbridge are the Clarendon Academy, the John of Gaunt School and St Augustine's Catholic College. All of the secondary schools also operate their own sixth forms. Larkrise School is a special school for children aged 3 to 19.

Wiltshire College has one of its four campuses in Trowbridge, offering various vocational courses for school-leavers.

== Healthcare ==
Trowbridge Cottage Hospital, now Trowbridge Community Hospital, was opened in 1870.

== Shopping and entertainment ==
The town centre is compact, and the focus for shops is the ancient Fore Street; the more modern Shires, Shires Gateway and Castle Place shopping centres provide a variety of outlets.

The civic centre, opened in 2011 and next to the town's central park, is a conference and entertainment venue and home to the town's information centre and Trowbridge Town Council. A nearby leisure development includes an Odeon cinema and several food vendors (Wagamama, Nando's etc.).

The former Town Hall, a large Victorian building, is a performance and exhibition venue used by community groups. At Wiltshire College, the Arc Theatre is used by students and local groups. There is a concert hall at Wiltshire Music Centre in neighbouring Bradford-on-Avon.

Trowbridge is part of the historic West Country Carnival circuit. There is an annual multi-day folk music festival called Trowbridge Festival, formerly Trowbridge Village Pump Festival; the 2024 edition was held at Southwick, near Trowbridge.

== Notable people ==
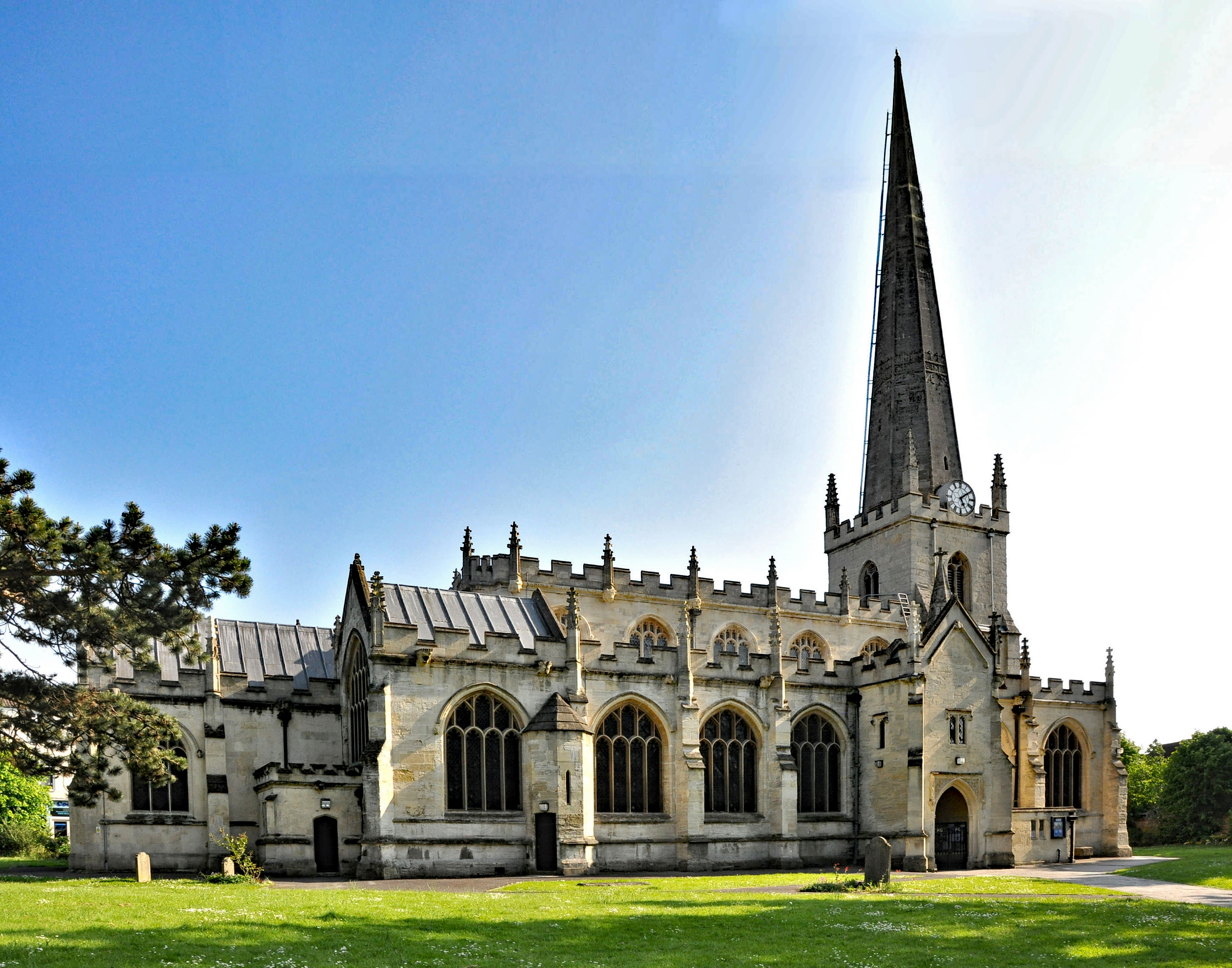
St James, the town's parish church

Methodism was introduced to the town by local evangelist Joanna Turner in the 18th century. Trowbridge was the birthplace of Sir Isaac Pitman in 1813, developer of the Pitman system of shorthand writing, who has several memorial plaques. Matthew Hutton (later archbishop of Canterbury) was the town's rector from 1726 to 1730. The poet George Crabbe held the same position from 1814 until his death in 1832.

Mary Mortimer, born in Trowbridge in 1816, became an American educator. Sir William Cook, born in Trowbridge in 1905, was involved with developing the British nuclear bomb at Aldermaston in the 1950s, becoming the establishment's deputy director.

Sir William Roger Brown (1831–1902), a Trowbridge mill-owner, employed more than a thousand people and donated a school, almshouses, and the Trowbridge Town Hall to the town.

David Stratton, the film critic, was born in Trowbridge in 1939. He founded the Melksham and District Film Society before emigrating to Australia in 1963, where he ran the Sydney Film Festival for 17 years, and presented the film review shows The Movie Show on SBS and At The Movies on the ABC.

Nick Blackwell, professional boxer and former British middleweight champion, is from Trowbridge, as are footballer Nathan Dyer (who played for Leicester City in the 2015-16 season when they won the Premier League), disgraced snooker player Stephen Lee, and Daniel Talbot, winner of the 4 × 100 m relay at the 2017 World Athletics Championships in a time of 37.47sec – the third fastest time in history.

The Oliver Twins, who created games such as the Dizzy series and founded Interactive Studios (later Blitz Games) in 1990, grew up in Trowbridge. A building at the Clarendon Academy is named after the brothers.

Tom Gale, a high jumper who represented Great Britain at the 2020 Tokyo Olympics, went to school in Trowbridge.

Stuart Farrimond, physician, researcher, and best-selling author, a frequent BBC radio and BBC television science communicator, lived in the town and taught at Wiltshire College.

Humphrey Burton, TV presenter and director, was born in Trowbridge. The BBC's first Head of Music and Arts, he was a key figure in launching the BBC Young Musician of the Year competition.

== Sport and leisure ==
The town has a non-league football club, Trowbridge Town F.C., which plays at Woodmarsh to the south of the town, near North Bradley.

Trowbridge Cricket Club plays at Trowbridge Cricket Club Ground, which Wiltshire County uses. The town's 1st XI plays in the Wiltshire division of the West of England Premier League.

Trowbridge Rugby Football Club, whose ground is at Hilperton to the northeast of the town, play in Southern Counties South.

Trowbridge Sports Centre, on the same site as The Clarendon Academy, has the town's only indoor swimming pool.

A greyhound racing track was opened around the Frome Road ground used by Trowbridge Town F.C. from 3 July 1976 until July 1979. The racing was independent (not affiliated with the sports governing body, the National Greyhound Racing Club) and was known as a flapping track, the nickname given to independent tracks. A series of meetings were also held during 1953.

== Town twinning ==
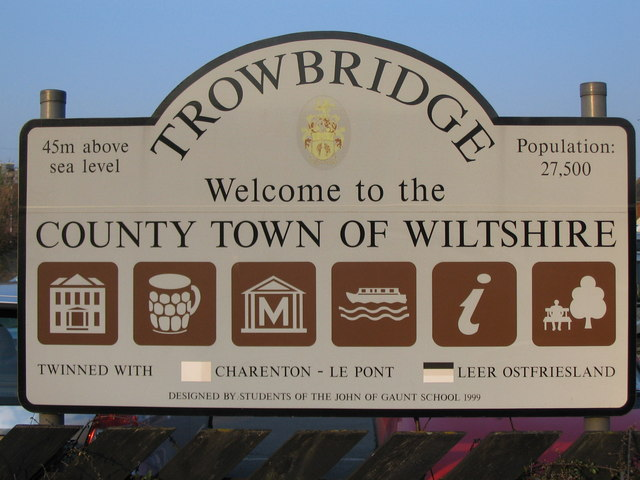
Welcome to Trowbridge

Trowbridge is twinned with four towns: Oujda, Morocco (since 2006), where most of the town's immigrant population originate; Leer, Germany (since 1989); Charenton-le-Pont, France (since 1996); and Elbląg, Poland (since 2000), as part of West Wiltshire district twinning,. The town was the first in England to twin with an Arab country.

== See also ==
- List of places in Wiltshire
