= River Biss =

River in Wiltshire, England

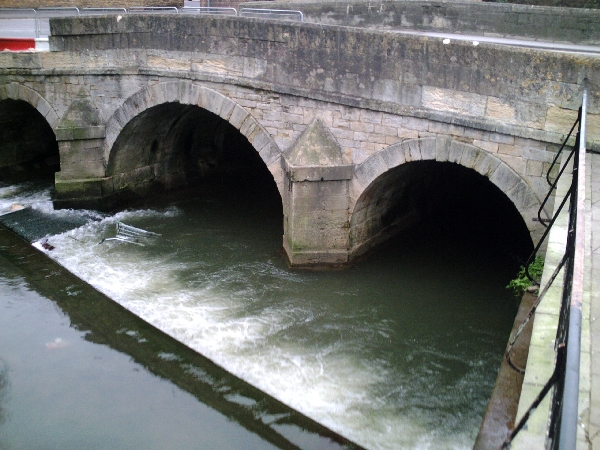
- The River Biss flowing under the town bridge in Trowbridge

Location
- Country: United Kingdom
- Region: Wiltshire

Physical characteristics
- Source
  - location: near Upton Scudamore, Wiltshire
  - coordinates: 51°13′42″N 2°11′40″W
- Mouth
  - location: Staverton, Wiltshire
  - coordinates: 51°20′12″N 2°12′56″W
- Length: 18.385 km (11.424 mi)
- Discharge
  - location: Staverton, Wiltshire

The River Biss is a small river in Wiltshire, England. It is a tributary of the Bristol Avon. The river rises on Salisbury Plain and passes through Westbury and Trowbridge, before meeting the Avon at Widbrook Wood near Staverton, north of Trowbridge.

== Name ==
The name is first attested as bis in a charter in 964, and is of uncertain origin. In early work on Wiltshire place-names, it is claimed that the word is from the Old Norse bisa, meaning "to strive". Eilert Ekwall suggests that the name is Brittonic, from the reconstructed word *bissi, cognate with Welsh bys and Cornish bis, literally meaning "finger" with the transferred sense of "fork or arm of a river".

== Progress ==
The river rises near Upton Scudamore on the western side of Salisbury Plain, at Biss Bottom, as the Biss Brook, and flows northwards passing Westbury towards Trowbridge. As it reaches Yarnbrook the brook becomes the River Biss.

The Baptist church at North Bradley lies close to the River Biss and in the 19th century river baptisms took place with over 2000 in attendance; the bridge here is still called 'The Baptising'.

The river enters the centre of Trowbridge from the south-east through the Biss Meadows Country Park. For a semi-urban location, the country park has a rich variety of wildlife and includes areas of three UK Biodiversity Action Plan priority habitats. Here the country park acts as a flood plain as well as an amenity space. Passing through Biss Meadows, it skirts round a pond (renovated in 2012 by the Friends), passes over a weir, skirts around the Tesco Extra car park (in 1993 the river was diverted here) and then flows under the County Way dual carriageway.

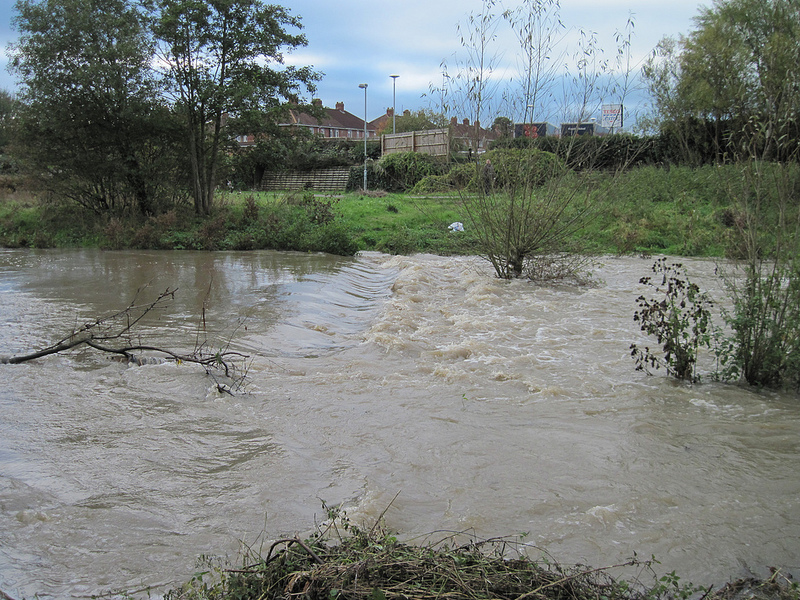
River Biss in full flood over the weir

It then flows through the Town Park, where a small constituent lake is haunt to wildfowl, before passing behind shops and industrial buildings in a Riverside Walk which was opened in 1993 by the Duke of Edinburgh. Before leaving the centre of Trowbridge, the Biss flows under the Town Bridge in roughly the location of the original river crossing which gives the town its name; in this area the river is home to the yellow water lily known as "Brandy Bottle" after the shape of its fruit and its characteristic scent.

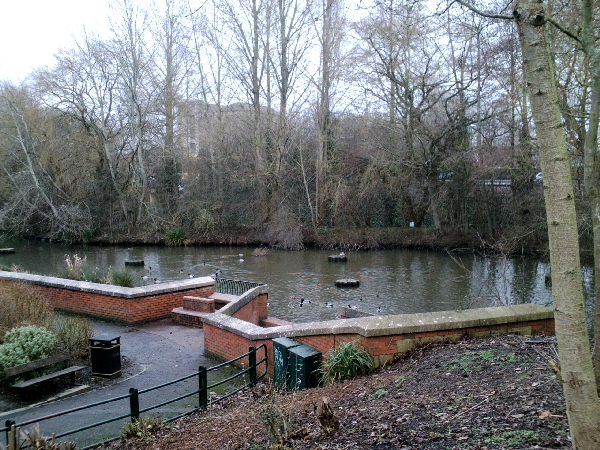
The lake in Trowbridge Town Park

Although Trowbridge is a former woollen cloth manufacturing town, for which a supply of water was required, the Biss was never substantial enough to satisfy the demands of that industry. However, there was an attempt to supply the town; the Trowbridge Water Company was formed and piped water was turned on in the town on 30 September 1874. Supplies were inadequate, however, and the venture failed. The company had premises in Waterworks Road, now a residential area.

On leaving the town centre, the Biss continues northwards through the Ladydown area. It is crossed by the Kennet and Avon Canal at the Biss Aqueduct before flowing into the River Avon in Widbrook Wood, south of Staverton.
