= Wiltshire Council =

Local authority in South West England

Coordinates: 51.317°N 2.210°W

- The coat of arms of the council

- Council logo

Type
- Type: Unitary authority

History
- Founded: 1 April 1889

Leadership
- Chairman: Laura Mayes, Conservative since 20 May 2025
- Leader: Ian Thorn, Liberal Democrats since 20 May 2025
- Chief Executive: Lucy Townsend since 24 July 2024

Structure
- Seats: 98 councillors
- Political groups: Administration (44) Liberal Democrats (43) Independent (1) Opposition (54) Conservative (38) Reform UK (10) Independent (6)
- Length of term: 4 years

Elections
- Voting system: First past the post
- Last election: 1 May 2025
- Next election: 3 May 2029

Meeting place
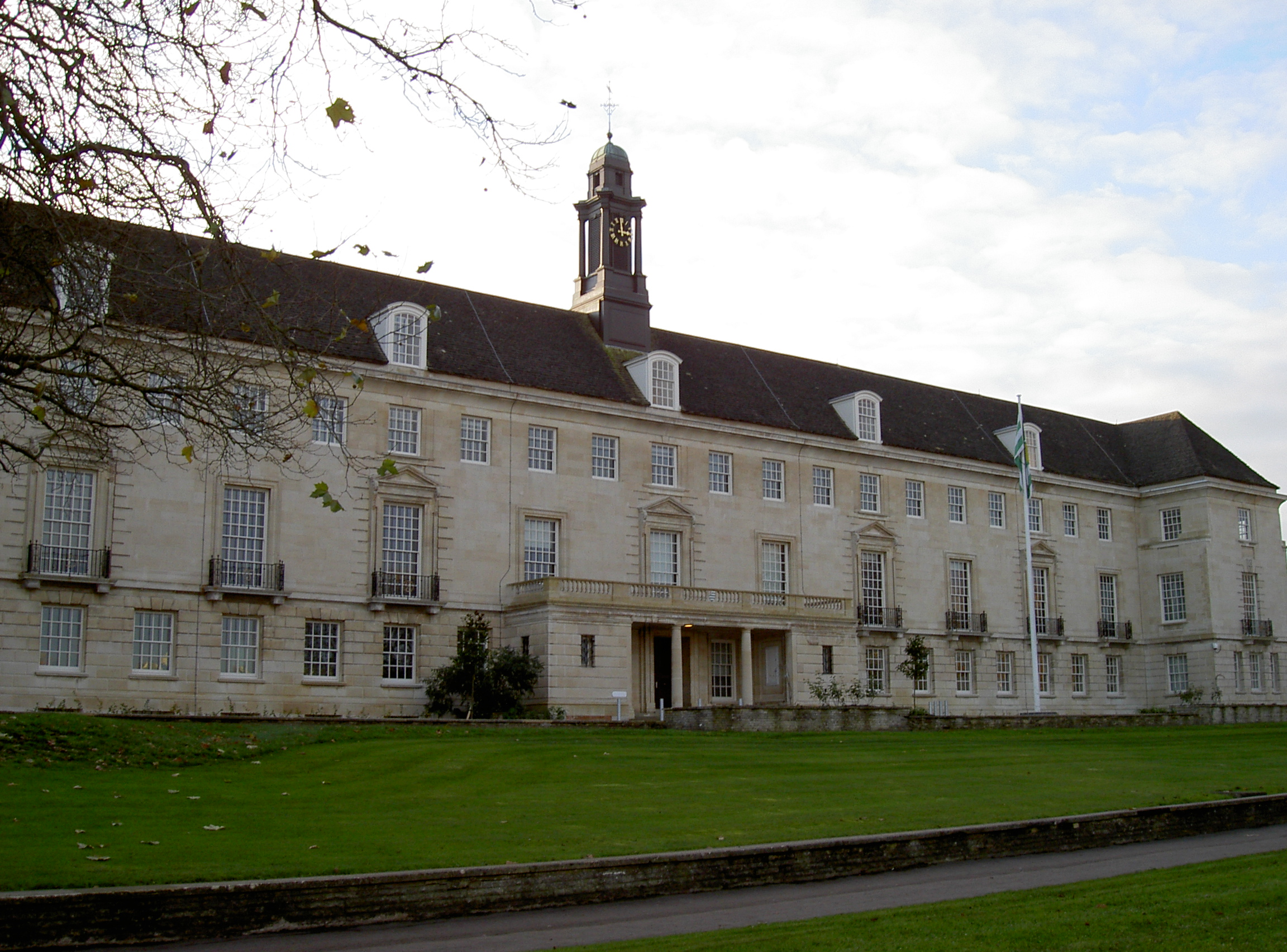
- County Hall, Bythesea Road, Trowbridge, BA14 8JN

Website
- www.wiltshire.gov.uk

Wiltshire Council, known between 1889 and 2009 as Wiltshire County Council, is the local authority for the non-metropolitan county of Wiltshire in South West England, and has its headquarters at County Hall in Trowbridge. Since 2009 it has been a unitary authority, being a county council which also performs the functions of a district council. The non-metropolitan county is smaller than the ceremonial county, the latter additionally including Swindon.

The council went under no overall control in May 2025, after being controlled by the Conservative Party since 2000.

== History ==
The logo until 2009

Elected county councils were established in 1889 under the Local Government Act 1888, taking over administrative functions previously carried out by unelected magistrates at the quarter sessions. The first elections to the new county council were held on 23 January 1889; the council had sixty seats, but in twenty-eight the candidate ran unopposed. The first provisional meeting of the council was held at Devizes Assize Court on 31 January 1889. The council formally came into its powers on 1 April 1889, on which day it held its first official meeting at Salisbury Guildhall. The first chairman was John Thynne, 4th Marquess of Bath.

The council was granted a coat of arms in 1937.

Until 1974 the lower tier of local government comprised numerous boroughs, urban districts and rural districts. In 1974 the lower tier was reorganised and Wiltshire was left with five districts: Kennet, North Wiltshire, Salisbury, Thamesdown and West Wiltshire. In 1997, Thamesdown was renamed 'Swindon' and converted into a unitary authority, removing it from the non-metropolitan county (the area controlled by Wiltshire County Council). This reduced the population of the non-metropolitan county by almost a third. Swindon remains part of the wider ceremonial county of Wiltshire.

As part of the 2009 structural changes to local government, Wiltshire's four remaining districts were abolished and their functions were taken over by Wiltshire County Council as from 1 April 2009. The way the changes were implemented was to create a single non-metropolitan district of Wiltshire matching the non-metropolitan county, but with no separate district council. Instead, the existing county council also took on the functions that legislation assigns to district councils, making it a unitary authority. The county council was given the option of omitting the word 'county' from its name as part of the reforms, which it took, becoming 'Wiltshire Council'.

== Governance ==
Since 2009, Wiltshire Council has provided both county-level and district-level services. The whole county is also covered by civil parishes, which form a lower tier of local government.

Most executive decisions are taken by the authority's cabinet, each member of which has a particular area of responsibility. Development control is undertaken by five planning committees, the powers of which cannot be exercised by the cabinet. Members of the authority are appointed to a wide range of outside bodies, providing them with some element of democratic accountability, such as the Kennet and Avon Canal Trust, the Wiltshire Victoria County History, and the Wiltshire Historic Buildings Trust.

=== Political control ===
The council has been under no overall control since the 2025 election, after which a partnership of the Liberal Democrats and independents formed to run the council, led by Liberal Democrat councillor Ian Thorn.

The political control of the council since 1974 has been as follows:

Upper-tier authority

| Party in control | Years |
|---|---|
| No overall control | 1974–1977 |
| Conservative | 1977–1985 |
| No overall control | 1985–1997 |
| Liberal Democrats | 1997–1997 |
| No overall control | 1997–2000 |
| Conservative | 2000–2009 |

Unitary authority

| Party in control | Years |
|---|---|
| Conservative | 2009–2025 |
| No overall control | 2025–present |

=== Leadership ===
The leaders of the council since 1998 have been:

| Councillor | Party | From | To |
|---|---|---|---|
| Peter Chalke | Conservative | 1998 | 15 Jul 2003 |
| Jane Scott | Conservative | 15 Jul 2003 | 9 Jul 2019 |
| Philip Whitehead | Conservative | 9 Jul 2019 | May 2021 |
| Richard Clewer | Conservative | 18 May 2021 | May 2025 |
| Ian Thorn | Liberal Democrats | 20 May 2025 | |

=== Composition ===
Following the 2025 Wiltshire Council election the composition of the council is:

| Party | Councillors |
|---|---|
| Liberal Democrats | 43 |
| Conservative | 38 |
| Reform | 10 |
| Independent | 7 |
| Total: | 98 |

One Conservative councillor was initially elected as an independent. Five of the independent councillors sit together as a group; the other two sit together in a "Salisbury Independent and Labour" group; the councillor elected for Labour in 2025 was expelled from the party in August 2026 due to his involvement in this group. One independent has joined the cabinet and the Lib Dem minority administration. The next election is due in 2029.

== Elections ==
Since the last full review of boundaries in 2021 the county has been divided into 98 electoral divisions, each electing one councillor. Elections are held every four years.

== Premises ==
The council is based at County Hall, Trowbridge, which was purpose-built for the council and was completed in 1940. It also has offices in Chippenham, Devizes and Salisbury.

At the council's first official meeting in 1889 there was a debate about where the council should meet in future. The quarter sessions which preceded the county council had met in rotation at Devizes, Marlborough, Salisbury and Warminster, and some advocated that the council should similarly travel around. Others made the case that the rapidly growing town of Swindon should be one of the meeting places. It was decided that Trowbridge should be the meeting place; although not central to the county geographically, it had the best railway connections to other parts of the county, and there was also a large new Town Hall already under construction there which could serve as a meeting place.

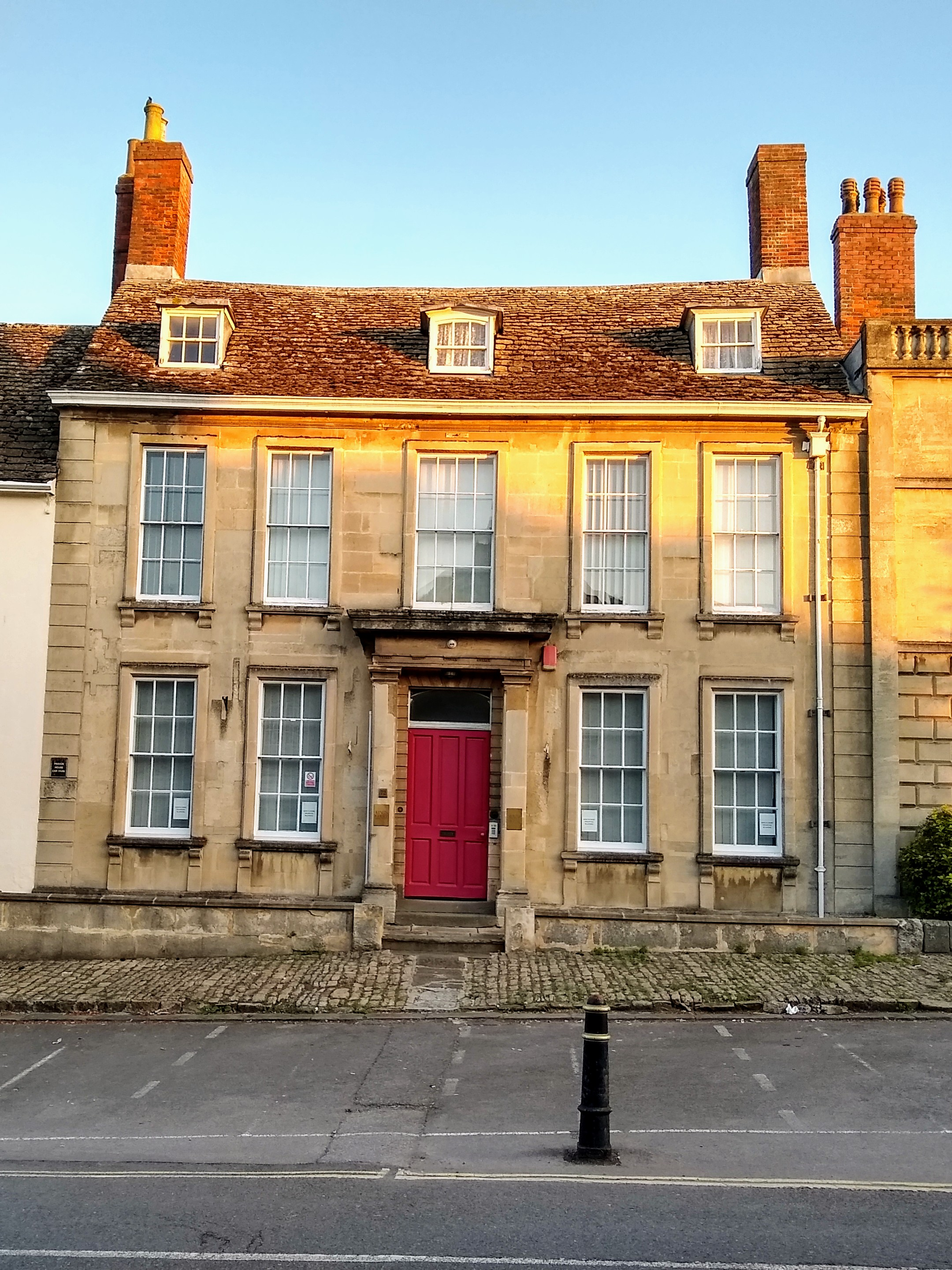
Arlington House, 72 Fore Street, Trowbridge: Council's headquarters 1896–1940.

As it happened, the council did continue to hold meetings in other towns for the first few years, but gradually consolidated its offices and meeting place in Trowbridge. In 1896, the council acquired Arlington House at 72 Fore Street in Trowbridge to act as its offices. The building was extended in 1900 to include a dedicated council chamber, and was extended again in 1913.

In 1930, the council decided to build a new county hall in Devizes, which is nearer the geographical centre of Wiltshire, but construction was delayed and in 1933 the decision was reversed. Instead a new County Hall was subsequently built on the former Trowbridge Town Football Club site on Bythesea Road in Trowbridge. The new building opened in 1940.

In 2012 County Hall was renovated and expanded at a cost of about £24 million. Services provided to the public in the building include the Trowbridge library, and the main office of the council's Registration Service.

== See also ==
- List of civil parishes in Wiltshire
- List of places in Wiltshire
- Wiltshire and Swindon History Centre
- Wiltshire Library and Information Service
