= Trowbridge Museum =

Textile industry museum in Trowbridge, England

Coordinates: 51.3208°N 2.2092°W

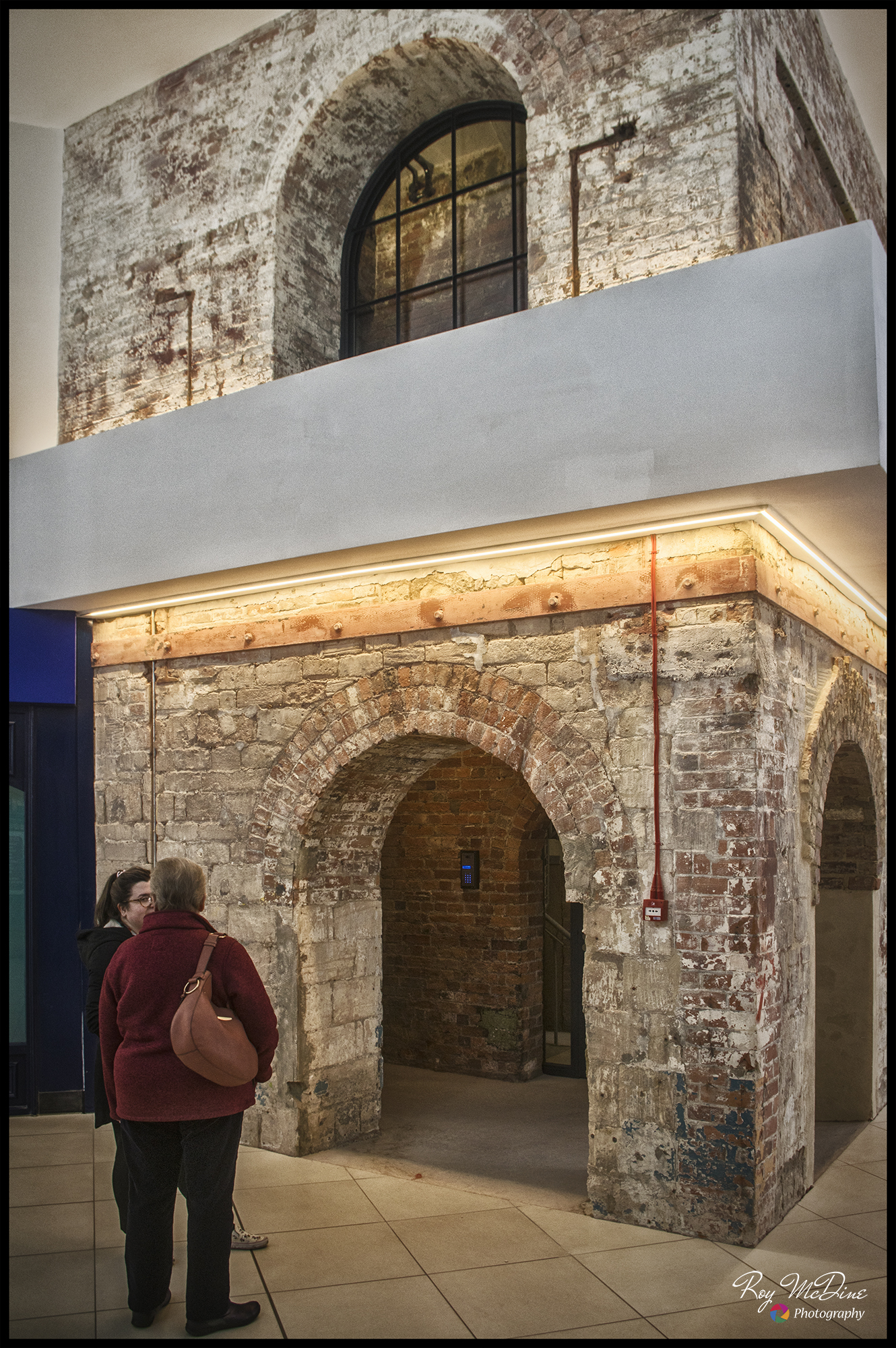
The entrance to Trowbridge Museum in 2020, featuring the original Home Mills brickwork

Trowbridge Museum, in the town of Trowbridge, Wiltshire, England, is a centre for the history of West of England cloth production.

== History ==
The museum began as one small room in the Town Hall until it moved to the purpose-built Garlick Room in the Civic Hall in 1974. It remained there until July 1990, when the developers of The Shires Shopping Centre allowed it to take over the first floor of the Home Mills building.

The museum closed to the public in June 2018 and reopened in May 2021 after renovation and expansion to include a second floor, doubling its size, and the addition of a lift to improve access. These works were made possible by £1.1m in funding from the National Lottery Heritage Fund, £900,000 from Trowbridge Town Council, and funds from The Friends of Trowbridge Museum and many members of the public.

== Exhibits and collections ==
The 2012 exhibition Rare Machinery presented the story of woollen cloth production in Trowbridge from its domestic beginnings through to the mechanisation of the process. As well as a complete Spinning Jenny – one of only five examples left in the world – the museum's displays included a fulling machine patented by Trowbridge engineer, John Dyer, in 1833. It was such a technically accomplished design that the machine remained unchanged and was still in use in the 20th century. A fine teazle gig, which was used to raise the nap of the cloth, was also on display. The machine contains numerous "handles" of teazles (this was the name for the frames into which the teazles were fixed) which were dried out in the Handle House which can be found near the town bridge and Blind House, and is almost as rare as the Spinning Jenny.

As of 2021, the museum has around 25,000 items in its collections. One of the staff's favourites is Joanna Turner's pocket watch, in silver and tortoiseshell, engraved inside with her name and the whole of the Lord's Prayer and Alexander Pope's Universal Prayer. She was a local evangelist in the 18th century.

== Textile and Weaving Festival ==
The Museum organises a bi-annual Textile and Weaving Festival which highlights the town's woollen cloth related architecture and the work of contemporary local textile artists.
