= Wiltshire County Council elections =

Local government elections in Wiltshire, England

Wiltshire County Council elections were first held on 23 January 1889, with the election of the first Wiltshire County Council. Thereafter, elections were held every three years, with all members being elected on the same day. Later, the cycle was changed to one election in every four years, and the last such election was in 2005. There were also occasional by-elections, the last of which took place in February 2008.

On 1 April 2009, the county council and the four Wiltshire district councils were merged into the new unitary Wiltshire Council.

== History ==
The council was established in 1889 as the principal local authority for the historic county of Wiltshire, at the same time as a large number of other county councils covering most of England and Wales. To begin with, the elected county councillors were supplemented by county aldermen, who were co-opted by the elected members and could then vote at meetings of the council. The aldermen had a term of office of six years. The first elections were held on 23 January 1889, with sixty seats available, but twenty-eight of them had only one candidate, so that only thirty-two saw contested elections. Among those elected unopposed were the Marquess of Bath, the Earl of Pembroke, the Earl of Suffolk, Sir Thomas Grove, 1st Baronet, Sir Charles Hobhouse, 4th Baronet, and Sir R. H. Pollen, Baronet. On 31 January 1889 the first meeting took place, and several aldermen were chosen to join the elected members.

The county aldermen were abolished by the Local Government Act 1972, although the Act allowed for honorary aldermen to be appointed, who would only be able to vote if they were also elected.

Although it gained further powers over the next hundred years, in form and area the county council continued little changed until April 1997, when the Borough of Swindon became a unitary authority in its own right, taking almost a third of the population out of the area of Wiltshire County Council.

At the time of the 2009 structural changes to local government in England, Wiltshire County Council and the four districts then within its geographical area were replaced by the new Wiltshire Council, a unitary authority covering the same area, with elections to that continuing to be held every four years. The first was in June 2009, when they coincided with an election to the European Parliament. Between April and June 2009, the existing county councillors were the members of the new authority.

== Political control ==
From the first election in 1973 following the reforms of the Local Government Act 1972 until the council's abolition in 2009, political control of the council was held by the following parties:

Party in control	Years
No overall control	1973–1977
Conservative	1977–1985
No overall control	1985–1997
Liberal Democrats	1997–1997
No overall control	1997–2000
Conservative	2000–2009

=== Leadership ===
The leaders of the council from 1998 until the council's abolition in 2009 were:

Councillor	Party	From	To
Peter Chalke	Conservative	1998	15 Jul 2003
Jane Scott	Conservative	15 Jul 2003	31 Mar 2009

Jane Scott went on to serve as the first leader of the successor Wiltshire Council.

== Election results ==
This list is incomplete

- 12 April 1973: The Conservatives, with thirty-nine seats, took effective control of the county council but were one short of a majority. Labour had twenty-two, Independents twelve, and the Liberals six. Twenty-four divisions were uncontested, with eighteen going to Conservatives, five to Independents, and one to a Liberal, Jack Ainslie.
- 5 May 1977: the Conservatives took overall control, winning fifty-seven seats, a gain of seventeen. Labour won fourteen, the Liberals and Independents four each.
- 7 May 1981: following boundary changes, the Conservatives again retained control, winning forty seats, Labour had twenty, the Liberals twelve, and Independents two, including one Ratepayer.
- 2 May 1985: the Conservatives lost their majority, winning only thirty seats, resulting in no overall control. The Liberals took seventeen seats and their Social Democrat allies eight, Labour seventeen, plus three Independents, including one Ratepayer. Following the elections, an agreement between the leader of the Liberals, Jack Ainslie, and the leader of the Labour members, Mary Salisbury, led to the formation of a minority SDP–Liberal Alliance administration.
- 4 May 1989: Conservatives 35, Liberal Democrats 18, Labour 18, Independents 2, Liberal 1, SDP 1, resulting in a continuation of no overall control, this time with the Liberal Democrats and Labour forming a joint administration.
- 6 May 1993: Liberal Democrats 33, Conservatives 18, Labour 17, resulting in a further four years of no overall control, with a Liberal Democrat and Labour administration.
- On 1 April 1997, Swindon was separated from Wiltshire to become a new unitary authority, giving the Liberal Democrats a brief period of overall control before that year's election.
- 1 May 1997 (the same day as the general election of 1997): Conservatives 22, Liberal Democrats 20, Labour 4, Independent 1, resulting in a continuation of no overall control, with a new Liberal Democrat and Labour administration being formed.
- On 2 April 1998 the Conservatives won a by-election in the Whorwellsdown division by 17 votes, and at the annual meeting in May 1998 a Conservative and Independent administration was formed.
- On 13 January 2000, the Conservatives won another by-election, this time in Melksham Without, gaining an overall majority which they were able to hold until the following year's elections.
- 7 June 2001 (a later date than usual to coincide with the general election of 2001): Conservatives 28, Liberal Democrats 14, Labour 3, Independents 2.
- 5 May 2005 (again coinciding with a general election): Conservatives 28, Liberal Democrats 16, Labour 3, Independents 2. Wiltshire County Council came to an end on 1 April 2009, when a new Wiltshire Council unitary authority was formed.

== Council elections ==
- 23 January 1889 Wiltshire County Council election
- 12 April 1973 Wiltshire County Council election
- 5 May 1977 Wiltshire County Council election
- 7 May 1981 Wiltshire County Council election
- 2 May 1985 Wiltshire County Council election
- 4 May 1989 Wiltshire County Council election
- 6 May 1993 Wiltshire County Council election
- 1 May 1997 Wiltshire County Council election
- 7 June 2001 Wiltshire County Council election
- 5 May 2005 Wiltshire County Council election

== Results maps ==
2005 results map

== By-election results ==
By-elections occur when seats become vacant between council elections. Below is a summary of recent by-elections; full by-election results can be found by clicking on the by-election name.

By-election	Date	Incumbent party	Winning party
Whorwellsdown by-election	2 April 1998	Liberal Democrats	Conservative
Alderbury by-election	1 July 1999	Conservative	Conservative
Melksham Without by-election	30 January 2000	Liberal Democrats	Conservative
Bedwyn and Pewsey by-election	20 July 2000	Conservative	Conservative
Salisbury St Paul by-election	14 November 2002	Labour	Labour
Chippenham Sheldon by-election	26 February 2004	Liberal Democrats	Liberal Democrats
Warminster West by-election	2 November 2006	Independent	Liberal Democrats
Trowbridge East by-election	7 February 2008	Liberal Democrats	Conservative
Holt and Paxcroft by-election	7 February 2008	Liberal Democrats	Independent

== See also ==
- List of electoral divisions and wards in Wiltshire
- Wiltshire Council elections
