= Robert Baddeley =

Robert Baddeley may refer to:

- Robert Baddeley (actor) (1733–1794), English actor
- Robert Baddeley (British Army officer) (born 1934), British soldier
