= 2005 Wiltshire County Council election =

2005 UK local government election

- 5 May 2005

All 49 seats to Wiltshire County Council 25 seats needed for a majority
	First party	Second party	Third party
	Con	LD	Lab
Party	Conservative	Liberal Democrats	Labour
Last election	28 seats, 43.7%	14 seats, 33.7%	3 seats, 16.9%
Seats won	28	16	2
Seat change	Steady	▲2	▼1
Popular vote	101,000	88,500	35,500
Percentage	41.9%	36.5%	14.5%
Swing	▼1.8%	▲2.8%	▼2.4%
	Fourth party
	Ind
Party	Independent
Last election	2 seats, 2.2%
Seats won	2
Seat change	Steady
Popular vote	10,700
Percentage	4.5%
Swing	▲2.3%
- Results of the 2005 Wiltshire County Council election
Council control before election
Conservative
Council control after election
Conservative

Elections to Wiltshire County Council were held on 5 May 2005, with the whole council up for election. They proved to be the last to the original county council, as the elections four years later were the first to its successor, the new Wiltshire Council unitary authority.

Most electoral divisions had boundary changes, and several were new, including three new two-member divisions, in Salisbury and Trowbridge.

As with other county elections in England, these local elections in Wiltshire took place on the same day as the 2005 United Kingdom general election. The previous 2001 Wiltshire Council election, had also coincided with the 2001 general election.

The result was that the Conservatives held onto control.

== Results ==
Wiltshire local election result 2005
Party	Seats	Gains	Losses	Net gain/loss	Seats %	Votes %	Votes	+/−
Conservative	28	0	0	0	57.1	41.9	101,000	–1.8
Liberal Democrats	16	2	0	+2	32.7	36.5	88,500	+2.8
Labour	3	0	0	0	6.1	14.5	35,500	–2.4
Independent	2	0	0	0	4.1	4.5	10,700	+2.3
Green	0	0	0	0	0.0	1.7	4,245	–1.8
UKIP	0	0	0	0	0.0	0.5	1,187	+0.5

== Results by divisions ==
=== Aldbourne and Ramsbury ===
Aldbourne and Ramsbury
Party	Candidate	Votes	%	±%
Conservative	Christopher Paul Humphries	2,392	51.4	
Liberal Democrats	Debra Davis	1,355	29.1	
Labour	Stephanie Mabbett	654	14.1	
UKIP	Nic Coome	249	5.4	
Majority		1,037	22.3	
Conservative hold		Swing		

=== Alderbury ===
Alderbury
Party	Candidate	Votes	%	±%
Conservative	William Raybould Moss	3,024	54.0	
Liberal Democrats	Henry Lawson	1,514	27.1	
Labour	Helen Edith (Janet) Horton	676	12.1	
Green	Adam Christopher Gent	382	6.8	
Majority		1,510	27.0	
Conservative hold		Swing		

=== Amesbury ===
Amesbury
Party	Candidate	Votes	%	±%
Conservative	John Cornelis Noeken	1,467	34.6	
Independent	Allan Godfrey Peach	1,223	28.9	
Liberal Democrats	Janet Mary (Jan) Swindlehurst	932	22.0	
Labour	Mark Riches	612	14.5	
Majority		244	5.8	
Conservative hold		Swing		

=== Avon and Pewsey ===
Avon and Pewsey
Party	Candidate	Votes	%	±%
Conservative	Anthony Molland	2,301	49.4	
Liberal Democrats	Patricia Marina (Tricia) Cavill	1,306	28.0	
Labour	Audrey Christine Jenkins	1,049	22.5	
Majority		995	21.4	
Conservative win (new seat)				

=== Bedwyn and Colingbourne ===
Bedwyn and Colingbourne
Party	Candidate	Votes	%	±%
Conservative	Robert Wallace Strachan Hall	2,368	50.5	
Liberal Democrats	David John Walker	1,390	29.6	
Labour	Catherine Amelia Brown	678	14.5	
UKIP	David Gordon Sedgwick	254	5.4	
Majority		978	20.9	
Conservative win (new seat)				

=== Bourne and Woodford Valley ===
Bourne and Woodford Valley
Party	Candidate	Votes	%	±%
Conservative	Kevin Christopher Wren	2,534		
Liberal Democrats	James Campbell Robertson	1,369		
Labour	Ian David McLennan	1,186		
Majority		1,165		
Conservative win (new seat)				

=== Box, Colerne, and Lacock ===
Box, Colerne, and Lacock
Party	Candidate	Votes	%	±%
Conservative	Judith Helen Seager	2,332		
Liberal Democrats	Sara-Louise Peterson	2,272		
Labour	Stephen Charles Wheeler	697		
Majority		60		
Conservative win (new seat)				

=== Bradford on Avon ===
Bradford on Avon
Party	Candidate	Votes	%	±%
Liberal Democrats	Malcolm George Hewson	2,959		
Conservative	Michael John Banks	1,766		
Labour	Nancy Webber	714		
Majority		1,193		
Liberal Democrats hold		Swing		

=== Bromham and Potterne ===
Bromham and Potterne
Party	Candidate	Votes	%	±%
Conservative	Patricia Rugg	2,171		
Liberal Democrats	Josephine Hester (Jo) Partt	1,240		
Labour	Lynda Wearn	842		
UKIP	John Maurice Ryan	305		
Majority		931		
Conservative win (new seat)				

=== Calne ===
Calne
Party	Candidate	Votes	%	±%
Conservative	Anthony John Trotman	2,034		
Liberal Democrats	Simon Richard Coy	1,352		
Labour	Christopher David Norman Evans	1,158		
Majority		682		
Conservative hold		Swing		

=== Calne and Without ===
Calne and Without
Party	Candidate	Votes	%	±%
Conservative	Nancy Suzanne Bryant	2,309		
Liberal Democrats	Elizabeth Margaret Hitchens	2,073		
Labour	Frank Jeffrey	600		
Majority		236		
Conservative win (new seat)				

=== Chalke and Nadder Valley ===
Chalke and Nadder Valley
Party	Candidate	Votes	%	±%
Conservative	Anthony Nicholas Deane	2,556		
Liberal Democrats	Peter Derek Edge	1,264		
Labour	Valerie May Pettefar	491		
Green	Hamish Douglas Soutar	407		
Majority		1,292		
Conservative win (new seat)				

=== Chippenham Central ===
Chippenham Central
Party	Candidate	Votes	%	±%
Liberal Democrats	Jeremy Ross Henning	1,424		
Conservative	Nina Margaret Phillips	1,396		
Labour	Maureen Frances Lloyd	706		
Majority		28		
Liberal Democrats win (new seat)				

=== Chippenham North ===
Chippenham North
Party	Candidate	Votes	%	±%
Liberal Democrats	Patrick Charles Bourne Coleman	2,291		
Conservative	Brendan Leo McCarron	1,855		
Labour	Richard Alistair Bur Pierce	597		
Majority		436		
Liberal Democrats win (new seat)				

=== Chippenham Pewsham ===
Chippenham Pewsham
Party	Candidate	Votes	%	±%
Liberal Democrats	Sylvia Kathleen Doubell	1,789		
Conservative	Vincent Howard Greenman	1,570		
Labour	David Ronald George Pool	619		
Majority		219		
Liberal Democrats win (new seat)				

=== Chippenham West ===
Chippenham West
Party	Candidate	Votes	%	±%
Liberal Democrats	Judith Hannah Rooke	1,917		
Conservative	Elizabeth Annette Kennedy	1,714		
Labour	Julie Lawrence	757		
Majority		203		
Liberal Democrats win (new seat)				

=== Corsham ===
Corsham
Party	Candidate	Votes	%	±%
Liberal Democrats	Peter Roy Davis	2,432		
Conservative	Richard Leslie (Dick) Tonge	1,327		
Labour	Judith Margaret Hible	819		
Majority		1,105		
Liberal Democrats hold		Swing		

=== Cricklade and Purton ===
Cricklade and Purton
Party	Candidate	Votes	%	±%
Liberal Democrats	Helen Margaret Dixon	2,222		
Conservative	Anthony Charles (Tony) Clements	1,983		
Labour	Frederick Albert (Fred) Price	712		
Majority		239		
Liberal Democrats hold		Swing		

=== Devizes North ===
Devizes North
Party	Candidate	Votes	%	±%
Labour	Margaret Sheila Nancy Taylor	1,310		
Conservative	Paula Mary Winchcombe	1,080		
Liberal Democrats	Donald (Don) Jones	725		
Devizes Guardians	Nigel Denys Carter	710		
Majority		230		
Labour win (new seat)				

=== Devizes South ===
Devizes South
Party	Candidate	Votes	%	±%
Conservative	Charles Stuart Winchcombe	1,106		
Liberal Democrats	Katherine Callow	933		
Devizes Guardians	Jeffrey George Ody	795		
Labour	Humphry Noel Woolrych	639		
Majority		173		
Conservative win (new seat)				

=== Downton and Ebble Valley ===
Downton and Ebble Valley
Party	Candidate	Votes	%	±%
Conservative	Julian Paul Johnson	2,152		
Liberal Democrats	Robert William (Rob) Steel	964		
Labour	John Anthony Shepherd	720		
Green	Stephanie Lorraine Jalland	379		
Majority		1,188		
Conservative win (new seat)				

=== Durrington and Bulford ===
Durrington and Bulford
Party	Candidate	Votes	%	±%
Conservative	Mark Lawrence Baker	1,881		
Liberal Democrats	James Richard Grenville Spencer	1,413		
Labour	Ricky Robinson	766		
Majority		468		
Conservative win (new seat)				

=== Holt and Paxcroft ===
Holt and Paxcroft
Party	Candidate	Votes	%	±%
Liberal Democrats	Sarah Marie Content	1,789		
Independent	Ernest Frederick (Ernie) Clark	1,613		
Conservative	Peter Kenneth (Ken) Beaton	1,300		
Majority		176		
Liberal Democrats win (new seat)				

=== Kington ===
Kington
Party	Candidate	Votes	%	±%
Conservative	Jane Antoinette Scott	3,288		
Liberal Democrats	David Edwin Inker	1,356		
Labour	Susan Mary Taylor Beasley	507		
Majority		1,932		
Conservative hold		Swing		

=== Lavington and Cannings ===
Lavington and Cannings
Party	Candidate	Votes	%	±%
Conservative	Dennis James Willmott	2,438		
Liberal Democrats	Geoffrey Charles (Geoff) Brewer	1,313		
Labour	Alistair Bisatt	1,005		
Majority		1,125		
Conservative win (new seat)				

=== Malmesbury ===
Malmesbury
Party	Candidate	Votes	%	±%
Conservative	John Percy Simon Stuart Thomson	3,228		
Liberal Democrats	Frances Ann Goldstone	1,868		
Labour	Arnold Shaw	614		
Majority		1,360		
Conservative win (new seat)				

=== Manor Vale ===
Manor Vale
Party	Candidate	Votes	%	±%
Liberal Democrats	Terrence Peter (Terry) Chivers	2,041		
Conservative	Peter Coupe Blackburn	1,710		
Labour	Angela Womersley	628		
Majority		331		
Liberal Democrats win (new seat)				

=== Marlborough ===
Marlborough
Party	Candidate	Votes	%	±%
Conservative	Elizabeth Marianne Hannaford	1,234		
Independent	Nicholas John Fogg	1,225		
Liberal Democrats	Caroline Veronica Jackson	1,068		
Labour	Cameron McLennan	506		
Majority		9		
Conservative gain from Liberal Democrats		Swing		

=== Melksham Central ===
Melksham Central
Party	Candidate	Votes	%	±%
Labour	Margaret Ethel White	1,268		
Liberal Democrats	Terri Welch	1,230		
Conservative	Kenneth Francis (Ken) Williams	1,078		
Green	Hilary Jane Millichamp	223		
Majority		38		
Labour win (new seat)				

=== Melksham Without ===
Melksham Without
Party	Candidate	Votes	%	±%
Conservative	Roy Sidney While	2,201		
Liberal Democrats	Stephen Bryan Petty	1,827		
Labour	William Charles Gordon Cox	1,561		
Majority		374		
Conservative hold		Swing		

=== Mere and Tisbury ===
Mere and Tisbury
Party	Candidate	Votes	%	±%
Conservative	Bridget Anne Wayman	1,791		
Independent	George Jeans	1,592		
Liberal Democrats	Nathaniel Joseph Collins	1,378		
Majority		199		
Conservative win (new seat)				

=== Minety ===
Minety
Party	Candidate	Votes	%	±%
Conservative	Carole Alethea Soden	3,521		
Liberal Democrats	John Stanley Cooper	1,641		
Labour	Pauline Margaret Smith	370		
Majority		1,880		
Conservative hold		Swing		

=== Salisbury East ===
Salisbury East (2 seats)
Party	Candidate	Votes	%	±%
Conservative	Mary Jaquelin Douglas	3,001		
Liberal Democrats	John Michael English	2,758		
Liberal Democrats	Susan Margaret (Su) Thorpe	2,705		
Conservative	Joanna Lloyd-Jones	2,472		
Labour	Andrew Charles Righton Roberts	1,385		
Green	Susan Isabel Wright	875		
Conservative win (new seat)				
Liberal Democrats win (new seat)				

=== Salisbury South ===
Salisbury South (2 seats)
Party	Candidate	Votes	%	±%
Liberal Democrats	Elizabeth Amanda (Bobbie) Chettleburgh	3,635		
Liberal Democrats	Brian Edward Dalton	3,255		
Conservative	William Anthony Beotric Snow	2,797		
Conservative	Christopher Gordon (Chris) Cochran	2,797		
Labour	Susan Caroline Mallory	827		
Labour	Ian Tomes	785		
Green	John Hansford	709		
Liberal Democrats win (new seat)				
Liberal Democrats win (new seat)				

=== Salisbury West ===
Salisbury West
Party	Candidate	Votes	%	±%
Labour	Richard Terrance Rogers	1,597		
Liberal Democrats	Timothy Anthony (Tim) Payne	1,234		
Conservative	Terence John Lindley	1,084		
Majority		363		
Labour win (new seat)				

=== Tidworth and Ludgershall ===
Tidworth and Ludgershall
Party	Candidate	Votes	%	±%
Conservative	Mark Connolly	1,948		
Liberal Democrats	Leslie Roy (Les) Welling	934		
UKIP	Anthony Hadland (Tony) Still	379		
Majority		1,014		
Conservative win (new seat)				

=== Trowbridge East ===
Trowbridge East (2 seats)
Party	Candidate	Votes	%	±%
Liberal Democrats	Grace Hill	4,090		
Liberal Democrats	Stephen John (Steve) Oldrieve	3,553		
Conservative	Peter Fuller	2,600		
Conservative	Anthony Ivan (Tony) Moore	2,471		
Labour	Gregory Anthony Coombes	1,487		
Labour	Peter John Ezra	1,328		
Liberal Democrats gain from Conservative		Swing		
Liberal Democrats win (new seat)				

=== Trowbridge West ===
Trowbridge West
Party	Candidate	Votes	%	±%
Liberal Democrats	Jeffrey Bryan Osborn	2,446		
Conservative	John Roland Wallace Knight	1,450		
Labour	Geoffrey Alan Mitcham	1,007		
Majority		996		
Liberal Democrats hold		Swing		

=== Warminster East and Wylye ===
Warminster East and Wylye
Party	Candidate	Votes	%	±%
Conservative	Andrew Davis	2,736		
Liberal Democrats	Joy Winifred Charman	1,732		
Independent	Dorothea Joan Main	987		
Majority		1,004		
Conservative win (new seat)				

=== Warminster West ===
Warminster West
Party	Candidate	Votes	%	±%
Independent	John Edward Syme	1,389		
Conservative	Russell Mark Jonathan Hawker	1,385		
Liberal Democrats	Paul Batchelor	1,141		
Majority		4		
Independent hold		Swing		

=== Westbury Ham and Dilton ===
Westbury Ham and Dilton
Party	Candidate	Votes	%	±%
Independent	Christopher Newbury	1,302		
Conservative	William Scott Shiel Braid	1,143		
Liberal Democrats	William David Charles Tout	1,127		
Labour	Michael Sutton	698		
Green	David John Howells	220		
Majority		159		
Independent win (new seat)				

=== Westbury Laverton and Shearwater ===
Westbury Laverton and Shearwater
Party	Candidate	Votes	%	±%
Conservative	Mary Fleur de Rhé-Philipe	2,141		
Liberal Democrats	Gordon Ian King	1,672		
Labour	Christine Linda Mitchell	672		
Green	Stephen Sainsbury	351		
Majority		469		
Conservative win (new seat)				

=== Whorwellsdown Hundred ===
Whorwellsdown Hundred
Party	Candidate	Votes	%	±%
Conservative	Julie Swabey	1,950		
Liberal Democrats	Trevor William Carbin	1,637		
Independent	Anthony Guy (Tony) Phillips	1,191		
Green	Amanda Jane (Mandy) Griffiths	371		
Majority		313		
Conservative gain from Liberal Democrats		Swing		

=== Wilton and Wylye ===
Wilton and Wylye
Party	Candidate	Votes	%	±%
Liberal Democrats	Ian Clive West	2,560		
Conservative	André Duncan Recknell	1,626		
Labour	Malcolm Simmons	456		
Green	Sarah Margaret Green	328		
Majority		934		
Liberal Democrats hold		Swing		

=== Wootton Bassett North ===
Wootton Bassett North
Party	Candidate	Votes	%	±%
Conservative	Mollie Eileen May Groom	1,993		
Liberal Democrats	Deborah Anne Gann	1,416		
Labour	Susan (Sue) Ford	629		
Majority		577		
Conservative hold		Swing		

=== Wootton Bassett South ===
Wootton Bassett South
Party	Candidate	Votes	%	±%
Conservative	Toby Russell Sturgis	2,534		
Liberal Democrats	Louise Jane Mortlock	1,981		
Labour	Ellis Webb	785		
Independent	Philip George Allnatt	199		
Majority		553		
Conservative hold		Swing		

== By-elections between 2005 and 2009 ==
=== Warminster West ===
Warminster West By-Election 2 November 2006
Party	Candidate	Votes	%	±%
Liberal Democrats	Paul Batchelor	548	40.2	+11.1
Conservative	Christopher March	543	39.8	+4.4
Independent	Michael John Turner	273	20.0	−15.5
Majority		5	0.4	
Turnout		1,364	21.3	
Liberal Democrats gain from Independent		Swing		

=== Trowbridge East ===
Trowbridge East By-Election 7 February 2008
Party	Candidate	Votes	%	±%
Conservative	Peter Fuller	1,363	49.2	+17.4
Liberal Democrats	Tom James	1,176	42.5	−7.5
Green	David McQueen	229	8.3	+8.3
Majority		187	6.7	
Turnout		2,768	19.2	
Conservative gain from Liberal Democrats		Swing		

=== Holt and Paxcroft ===
Holt and Paxcroft By-Election 7 February 2008
Party	Candidate	Votes	%	±%
Independent	Ernie Clark	1,075	41.0	+6.7
Liberal Democrats	Trevor Carbin	994	37.9	−0.1
Conservative	Andy Milton	458	17.4	−10.2
Labour	Louise Smith	53	2.0	+2.0
Green	Hilary Millichamp	45	1.7	+1.7
Majority		81	3.1	
Turnout		2,625	37.0	
Independent gain from Liberal Democrats		Swing		
