= Minister of State for Communities and Faith =

United Kingdom Minister of State for Communities and Faith
- Royal Arms of His Majesty's Government

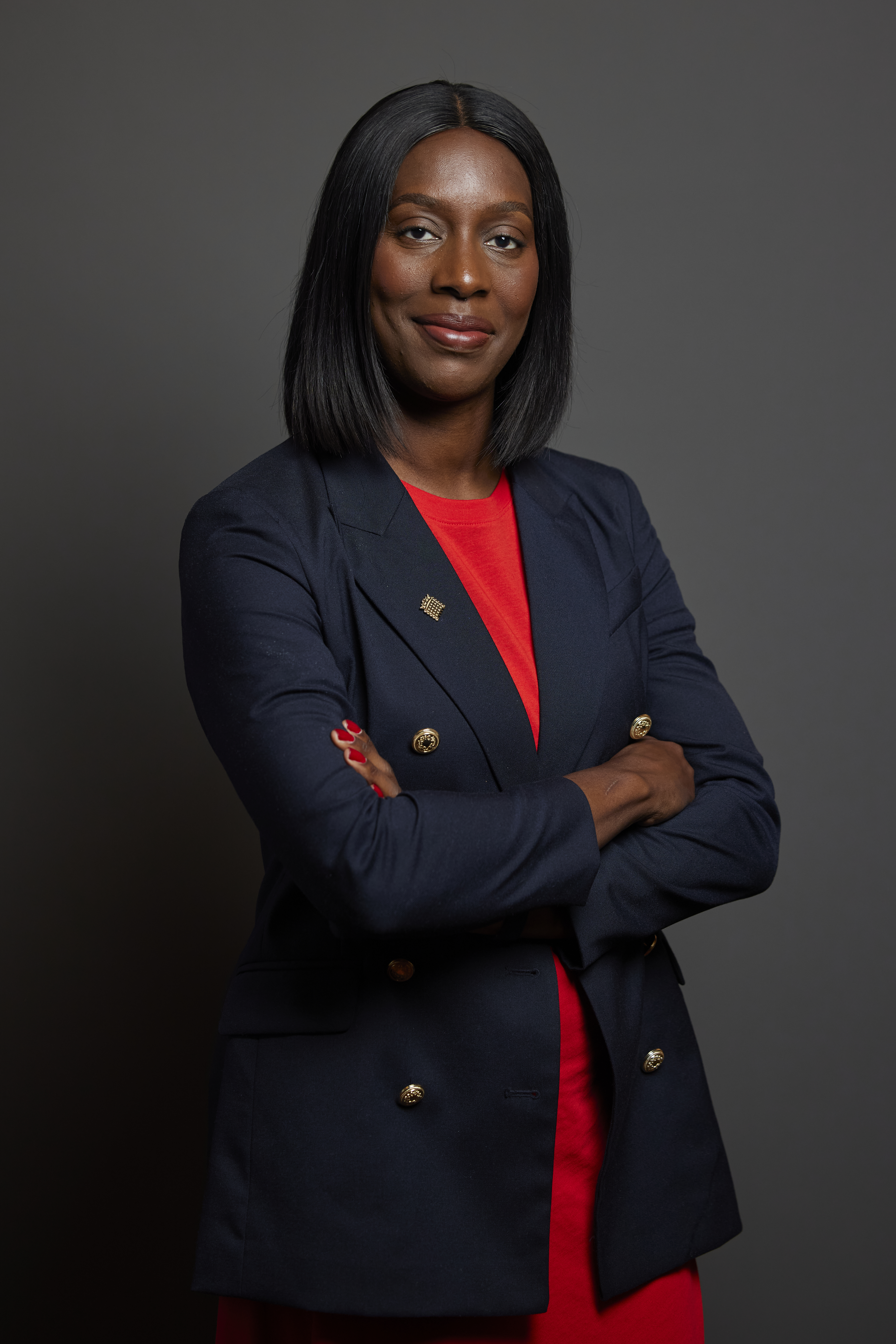
- Incumbent; Florence Eshalomi since 22 July 2026
- Ministry of Housing, Communities and Local Government
- Nominator: Prime Minister
- Appointer: The Monarch; on advice of the Prime Minister
- Term length: At His Majesty's pleasure
- Website: https://www.gov.uk/government/ministers/parliamentary-under-secretary-of-state--313

The Minister of State for Homelessness, Democracy, Communities and Faith is a junior minister in the Ministry of Housing, Communities and Local Government.

== Ministers ==
Name	Portrait	Entered office	Left office	Political party	Prime Minister
Minister of State for Faith and Communities
Baroness Warsi		6 September 2012	5 August 2014	Conservative	Cameron–Clegg
Minister of State for Faith
Eric Pickles		6 August 2014	11 May 2015	Conservative	Cameron–Clegg
Minister of State for Communities and Resilience
Mark Francois		11 May 2015	16 July 2016	Conservative	Cameron II
Parliamentary Under-Secretary of State for Faith
Lord Bourne of Aberystwyth		17 July 2016	26 July 2019	Conservative	May I & II
Parliamentary Under-Secretary of State for Faith and Communities
Viscount Younger of Leckie		27 July 2019	13 February 2020	Conservative	Johnson I & II
Minister of State for Local Government, Faith and Communities
Kemi Badenoch		16 September 2021	6 July 2022	Conservative	Johnson II
Parliamentary Under Secretary of State for Faith and Communities
Baroness Scott of Bybrook		20 September 2022	13 November 2023	Conservative	Truss; Sunak
Parliamentary Under-Secretary of State for Social Housing and Faith
Baroness Scott of Bybrook		13 November 2023	5 July 2024	Conservative	Sunak
Parliamentary Under-Secretary of State for Faith, Communities and Resettlement
Lord Khan of Burnley		9 July 2024	7 September 2025	Labour	Starmer
Parliamentary Under-Secretary of State for Devolution, Faith and Communities
Miatta Fahnbulleh		6 September 2025	12 May 2026	Labour Co-op	Starmer
Parliamentary Under-Secretary of State for Faith
Lord Lemos		12 June 2026	22 July 2026	Labour	Starmer
Minister of State for Homelessness, Democracy, Communities and Faith
Florence Eshalomi		22 July 2026	Incumbent	Labour Co-op	Burnham

== See also ==
- Minister of state (United Kingdom)
- Parliamentary under-secretary of state
