= 1997 Wiltshire County Council election =

1997 UK local government election

← 1993	1 May 1997	2001 →

All 47 seats to Wiltshire County Council 24 seats needed for a majority
	First party	Second party	Third party
	Con	LD	Lab
Party	Conservative	Liberal Democrats	Labour
Last election	18 seats, 36%	33 seats, 37.5%	17 seats, 22.5%
Seats won	22	20	4
Seat change	▲4	▼13	▼13
Popular vote	107,867	87,367	45,365
Percentage	43.4%	35.2%	18.3%
Swing	▲7.4%	▼2.3%	▼4.2%
	Fourth party
	Ind
Party	Independent
Last election	0 seats, 1.9%
Seats won	1
Seat change	▲1
Popular vote	3,978
Percentage	1.6%
Swing	▼0.3%
Council control before election
Liberal Democrats
Council control after election
No overall control

Elections to Wiltshire County Council were held on 1 May 1997. The whole council was up for election and the result was no overall control, with the Conservatives as the largest party.

As with other county elections in England, these local elections in Wiltshire took place on the same day as the 1997 United Kingdom general election.

== Results ==
Wiltshire local election result 1997
Party	Seats	Gains	Losses	Net gain/loss	Seats %	Votes %	Votes	+/−
Conservative	22			+4	46.81	43.4	107,867	+46,488
Liberal Democrats	20			-13	42.55	35.2	87,367	+23,260
Labour	4			-13	8.51	18.3	45,365	+6,920
Independent	1	1	0	+1	2.13	1.6	3,978	+426
Green	0	0	0	0	0	1.4	3,481	+2,402
Liberal	0	0	0	0	0	0.14	257	-1,992
UKIP	0	0	0	0	0	0.09	230	+230

== Results by divisions ==
=== Aldbourne and Ramsbury ===
Aldbourne and Ramsbury
Party	Candidate	Votes	%	±%
Conservative	Christopher Paul Humphries	2,571		
Liberal Democrats	Graham Francis	2,213		
Labour	Brian McLintock	660		
Majority		358		
Conservative gain from Liberal Democrats		Swing		

=== Alderbury ===
Alderbury
Party	Candidate	Votes	%	±%
Conservative	Charles Temple Blackwood	2,668		
Liberal Democrats	Roger Hardy	1,114		
Labour	Ann Oliver	599		
Majority		757		
Conservative hold		Swing		

=== Amesbury ===
Amesbury
Party	Candidate	Votes	%	±%
Conservative	Allan Godfrey Peach	2,283		
Liberal Democrats	Michael Allen	1,389		
Labour	Ross Pelling	722		
Green	Peter Matthews	157		
Majority		894		
Conservative gain from Liberal Democrats		Swing		

=== Avon and Cannings ===
Avon and Cannings
Party	Candidate	Votes	%	±%
Conservative	Dennis James Willmott	2,207		
Liberal Democrats	John Thompson	1,582		
Labour	Terrence O'Sullivan	1,118		
UKIP	Alan Wood	108		
Majority		625		
Conservative hold		Swing		

=== Bedwyn and Pewsey ===
Bedwyn and Pewsey
Party	Candidate	Votes	%	±%
Liberal Democrats	Jennifer Mary Scott	2,735		
Conservative	Arthur Bromwich	2,380		
Labour	Michael Maude	884		
Majority		355		
Liberal Democrats hold		Swing		

=== Bourne Valley ===
Bourne Valley
Party	Candidate	Votes	%	±%
Conservative	Kevin Christopher Wren	2,718		
Liberal Democrats	Simon Frost	1,705		
Labour	Mark Riches	920		
Majority		1,013		
Conservative hold		Swing		

=== Bradford on Avon ===
Bradford on Avon
Party	Candidate	Votes	%	±%
Liberal Democrats	Victoria Christine Scott Landell Mills	2,710		
Conservative	Robert George Ian Elliott	1,533		
Labour	Angela Womersley	934		
Green	David Gilbert	385		
UKIP	John Douglas Sankey	122		
Majority		1,177		
Liberal Democrats hold		Swing		

=== Bremhill and Calne ===
Bremhill and Calne
Party	Candidate	Votes	%	±%
Conservative	Christine Crisp	2,854		
Liberal Democrats	Sandra Webb	2,277		
Labour	David Songhurst	868		
Majority		577		
Conservative hold		Swing		

=== Calne ===
Calne
Party	Candidate	Votes	%	±%
Conservative	Nancy Suzanne Bryant	1,854		
Liberal Democrats	Jeanette Greer	1,692		
Labour	Maureen Songhurst	1,354		
Majority		162		
Conservative gain from Liberal Democrats		Swing		

=== Chippenham Park ===
Chippenham Park
Party	Candidate	Votes	%	±%
Liberal Democrats	Patrick Charles Bourne Coleman	2,746		
Conservative	Mary Norton	1,661		
Labour	Stephen Wheeler	863		
Majority		1,085		
Liberal Democrats hold		Swing		

=== Chippenham Sheldon ===
Chippenham Sheldon
Party	Candidate	Votes	%	±%
Liberal Democrats	June Margaret Wood	1,994		
Conservative	Donald Ellis	1,392		
Labour	Maureen Lloyd	1,357		
Majority		552		
Liberal Democrats hold		Swing		

=== Chippenham Town ===
Chippenham Town
Party	Candidate	Votes	%	±%
Liberal Democrats	Philip George Allnatt	2,709		
Conservative	Richard Purdon	1,967		
Labour	Tim Hayhoe	712		
Majority		742		
Liberal Democrats hold		Swing		

=== Collingbourne ===
Collingbourne
Party	Candidate	Votes	%	±%
Liberal Democrats	Mark Connolly	1,613		
Conservative	Peter Colling	1,489		
Labour	Eric Dalkin	722		
Independent	Anthony Still	489		
Majority		122		
Liberal Democrats hold		Swing		

=== Corsham ===
Corsham
Party	Candidate	Votes	%	±%
Liberal Democrats	Peter Roy Davis	1,893		
Conservative	Hywel Jones	1,438		
Labour	Chris Reid	799		
Majority		455		
Liberal Democrats hold		Swing		

=== Cricklade and Purton ===
Cricklade and Purton
Party	Candidate	Votes	%	±%
Liberal Democrats	Brian Edward Atfield	2,570		
Conservative	Peter Smith	1,862		
Labour	Brian Bayton	773		
Majority		708		
Liberal Democrats hold		Swing		

=== Devizes ===
Devizes
Party	Candidate	Votes	%	±%
Labour	Margaret Sheila Nancy Taylor	1,918		
Conservative	Maurice Came	1,496		
Liberal Democrats	Bryan Castle	893		
Majority		422		
Labour gain from Conservative		Swing		

=== Devizes South and Bromham ===
Devizes South and Bromham
Party	Candidate	Votes	%	±%
Conservative	Patricia Rugg	2,932		
Labour	James Thorpe	1,647		
Liberal Democrats	Henry Jordan	1,636		
Majority		1,285		
Conservative hold		Swing		

=== Downton ===
Downton
Party	Candidate	Votes	%	±%
Conservative	Julian Paul Johnson	2,814		
Liberal Democrats	Roger Ford	1,617		
Labour	Hamish Ross	1,047		
Green	Marion Reed	310		
Majority		1,197		
Conservative hold		Swing		

=== Durrington ===
Durrington
Party	Candidate	Votes	%	±%
Conservative	Linda Patricia Morris	1,731		
Liberal Democrats	Judith Greville	1,636		
Labour	Tamsen Jacobs	812		
Green	Mark Pafford	105		
Majority		95		
Conservative hold		Swing		

=== Holt ===
Holt
Party	Candidate	Votes	%	±%
Liberal Democrats	Terrence Peter (Terry) Chivers	2,792		
Conservative	Carolyn Joy Walker	2,142		
Labour	Gregory Anthony Coombes	537		
Liberal	George Frederick James Hawkins	256		
Green	John Richard Pearce	230		
Majority		650		
Liberal Democrats hold		Swing		

=== Kington ===
Kington
Party	Candidate	Votes	%	±%
Conservative	Jane Antoinette Scott	3,002		
Liberal Democrats	Doreen Darby	2,926		
Labour	Peter Mellett	732		
Majority		76		
Conservative gain from Liberal Democrats		Swing		

=== Lavington ===
Lavington
Party	Candidate	Votes	%	±%
Conservative	Derek Bernard William Jarvis	2,663		
Liberal Democrats	Ann Thomson	1,534		
Labour	David Wearn	1,158		
Majority		1,129		
Conservative hold		Swing		

=== Malmesbury ===
Malmesbury
Party	Candidate	Votes	%	±%
Liberal Democrats	Lesley Clare Stockman Bennett	2,490		
Conservative	Andrew Watson	2,369		
Labour	Daphne Jones	837		
Majority		121		
Liberal Democrats hold		Swing		

=== Marlborough ===
Marlborough
Party	Candidate	Votes	%	±%
Liberal Democrats	Margaret Boulton	1,816		
Conservative	Josephine Goodfellow	1,772		
Labour	Alec Light	782		
Majority		44		
Liberal Democrats hold		Swing		

=== Melksham ===
Melksham
Party	Candidate	Votes	%	±%
Labour	Mary Salisbury	1,567		
Liberal Democrats	Angela Betty Barker	1,354		
Conservative	Kenneth Williams	768		
Majority		213		
Labour gain from Liberal Democrats		Swing		

=== Melksham Without ===
Melksham Without
Party	Candidate	Votes	%	±%
Liberal Democrats	John Barrie Wesley	2,524		
Conservative	Anthony Molland	2,193		
Labour	John Adcock	1,663		
Majority		187		
Liberal Democrats hold		Swing		

=== Mere ===
Mere
Party	Candidate	Votes	%	±%
Conservative	Robert George Catton	2,131		
Liberal Democrats	Mark Houghton-Brown	1,346		
Labour	Graham Parish	604		
Majority		785		
Conservative hold		Swing		

=== Minety ===
Minety
Party	Candidate	Votes	%	±%
Conservative	Carole Alethea Soden	3,418		
Liberal Democrats	Anne Davis	1,925		
Labour	John Battersby	457		
Majority		1,493		
Conservative hold		Swing		

=== Pickwick with Box ===
Pickwick with Box
Party	Candidate	Votes	%	±%
Conservative	Judith Helen Seager	1,984		
Liberal Democrats	Dianne McGee	1,701		
Labour	Christopher Lynch	1,375		
Majority		283		
Conservative hold		Swing		

=== Salisbury Bemerton ===
Salisbury Bemerton
Party	Candidate	Votes	%	±%
Labour	Richard Terance Rogers	2,040		
Conservative	Pamela Roche	997		
Liberal Democrats	Jo Heaney	883		
Majority		1,043		
Labour hold		Swing		

=== Salisbury Harnham ===
Salisbury Harnham
Party	Candidate	Votes	%	±%
Conservative	Iris Throp	1,852		
Liberal Democrats	Brian Dalton	1,261		
Labour	Gary Buckley	665		
Green	Rosemary Perry	186		
Majority		591		
Conservative gain from Liberal Democrats		Swing		

=== Salisbury St Mark ===
Salisbury St Mark
Party	Candidate	Votes	%	±%
Conservative	Peter Frederick Chalke	2,399		
Liberal Democrats	John Cherry	1,239		
Labour	Kelvin Dawson	731		
Green	Susan Wright	132		
Majority		1,160		
Conservative hold		Swing		

=== Salisbury St Martin ===
Salisbury St Martin
Party	Candidate	Votes	%	±%
Liberal Democrats	Paul William Leslie Sample	2,261		
Conservative	Kevin Robbin	1,511		
Labour	Susan Mallory	772		
Green	Indira Nath	209		
Majority		750		
Liberal Democrats hold		Swing		

=== Salisbury St Paul ===
Salisbury St Paul
Party	Candidate	Votes	%	±%
Labour	Beryl Mary Jay	2,503		
Conservative	Timothy Nolan	1,102		
Liberal Democrats	Rachel Smith	840		
Majority		1,401		
Labour hold		Swing		

=== Southwick ===
Southwick
Party	Candidate	Votes	%	±%
Liberal Democrats	John Napier Beatson Irving	1,687		
Independent	Anthony Guy Phillips	1,500		
Labour	Brian Michael Staines	571		
Green	David John Howells	316		
Majority		187		
Liberal Democrats hold		Swing		

=== Tisbury ===
Tisbury
Party	Candidate	Votes	%	±%
Conservative	Robert John Baddeley	2,420		
Liberal Democrats	Felicity Corp	1,571		
Labour	Paul Whiteside	567		
Majority		849		
Conservative hold		Swing		

=== Trowbridge East ===
Trowbridge East
Party	Candidate	Votes	%	±%
Liberal Democrats	Thomas Raymond James	1,754		
Conservative	Joan Barbara Savage	1,484		
Labour	Jeffrey Bryan Osborn	1,244		
Green	Antoinette (Toni) Beizsley	150		
Majority		270		
Liberal Democrats hold		Swing		

=== Trowbridge South ===
Trowbridge South
Party	Candidate	Votes	%	±%
Liberal Democrats	Grace Hill	2,363		
Labour	Jefferey David Morris	1,628		
Conservative	Patrick Andrew Sturges	1,473		
Majority		735		
Liberal Democrats hold		Swing		

=== Trowbridge West ===
Trowbridge West
Party	Candidate	Votes	%	±%
Liberal Democrats	Nicholas Shawne Edney Westbrook	1,482		
Conservative	Anthony Ivan Moore	1,041		
Labour	Helen Bridget Osborn	929		
Green	Carolyn Susan (Lyn) Davis	120		
Majority		441		
Liberal Democrats hold		Swing		

=== Upper Wylye Valley ===
Upper Wylye Valley
Party	Candidate	Votes	%	±%
Conservative	Mary Fleur de Rhé-Philipe	2,076		
Liberal Democrats	John Denby-Gardner	1,167		
Labour	Ernest Martin McCleave	501		
Green	Kevan James Corcoran	220		
Majority		909		
Conservative hold		Swing		

=== Warminster East ===
Warminster East
Party	Candidate	Votes	%	±%
Conservative	Dorothea Joan Main	1,716		
Liberal Democrats	Catherine Jane Day	1,187		
Labour	Robert Alan Smith	706		
Green	Jonathan William Daniels	224		
Majority		529		
Conservative hold		Swing		

=== Warminster West ===
Warminster West
Party	Candidate	Votes	%	±%
Liberal Democrats	John Edward Syme	2,599		
Conservative	Helen Kathleen Margaret Muriel Rowley	1,623		
Green	Elsa-Marie Kitching	483		
Majority		976		
Liberal Democrats hold		Swing		

=== Westbury ===
Westbury
Party	Candidate	Votes	%	±%
Independent	Christopher Newbury	1,686	29.2	
Liberal Democrats	Gordon Ian King	1,650	28.6	
Conservative	John Aidan Booth	1,324	22.9	
Labour	Michael Sutton	974	16.8	
Green	James Oliver Toyne	102	1.7	
Majority		36	0.6	
Independent gain from Liberal Democrats		Swing		

=== Whorwellsdown Hundred ===
Whorwellsdown Hundred
Party	Candidate	Votes	%	±%
Liberal Democrats	Douglas Malcolm Firmager	2,348		
Conservative	Geoffrey Richards	1,910		
Labour	John William Hawkes	718		
Majority		438		
Liberal Democrats hold		Swing		

=== Wilton and Wylye ===
Wilton and Wylye
Party	Candidate	Votes	%	±%
Liberal Democrats	Ian Clive West	2,293		
Conservative	Anthony Brown-Hovelt	1,987		
Labour	Michael Thomas	725		
Independent	Timothy Ingle Abbott	303		
Green	Sarah Green	152		
Majority		306		
Liberal Democrats hold		Swing		

=== Wootton Bassett North ===
Wootton Bassett North
Party	Candidate	Votes	%	±%
Conservative	Mollie Eileen May Groom	1,789		
Liberal Democrats	Duncan Bamford	1,327		
Labour	Julian Watson	679		
Majority		462		
Conservative gain from Liberal Democrats		Swing		

=== Wootton Bassett South ===
Wootton Bassett South
Party	Candidate	Votes	%	±%
Conservative	Toby Russell Sturgis	2,641		
Liberal Democrats	Daphne Matthews	2,323		
Labour	Ellis Webb	991		
Majority		318		
Conservative gain from Liberal Democrats		Swing		

== By-elections between 1997 and 2001 ==
Whorwellsdown By-Election 2 April 1998
Party	Candidate	Votes	%	±%
Conservative	Joan Barbara Prouse Savage	1,095	50.4	+12.0
Liberal Democrats	Trevor William Carbin	1,078	49.6	+2.4
Majority		17	0.8	
Turnout		2173	34.6	
Conservative gain from Liberal Democrats		Swing		

Alderbury By-Election 1 July 1999
Party	Candidate	Votes	%	±%
Conservative	Gerard Downes	1,223	60.6	
Liberal Democrats	Gillian Morgan	682	33.8	
Labour	Mark Wareham	114	5.6	
Majority		541	26.8	
Turnout		2,019	30.35	
Conservative hold		Swing		

Melksham Without By-Election 13 January 2000
Party	Candidate	Votes	%	±%
Conservative	William Arthur Spiers	810	48.6	+15.1
Liberal Democrats	Angela Betty Barker	623	37.4	−1.2
Labour	Marcus Aurelius	234	14.0	−11.4
Majority		187	11.2	
Turnout		1,667	18.4	
Conservative gain from Liberal Democrats		Swing		

Bedwyn and Pewsey By-Election 20 July 2000
Party	Candidate	Votes	%	±%
Conservative	David Lay	1,470	61.8	+22.1
Liberal Democrats	Graham Francis	771	32.4	−13.1
Labour	Terrence O'Sullivan	139	5.8	−8.9
Majority		699	29.4	
Turnout		2,380	29.4	
Conservative hold		Swing		
