= Christopher Newbury =

British politician

Christopher Newbury (born 1956) is a British Conservative politician. He was a member of the Congress of the Council of Europe from 1998 to 2010 and since 2009 has been a member of the new Wiltshire Council, created that year.

== Early life ==
Newbury was educated at Gresham's School and Keble College, Oxford. In 1976, he represented the Oxford Union in the Observer Mace debating competition with Benazir Bhutto. In a Ravenscroft production of Macbeth, he played Macbeth opposite Guy Hands as Lady Macbeth.

== Council of Europe ==
Newbury was appointed to the UK Delegation to the Congress of the Council of Europe in 1998 to represent English and Welsh Independents. From 1999 he specialised in monitoring local democracy and observing elections, preparing Congress reports on local democracy in Bosnia and Herzegovina (2001 and 2006), Armenia (2003), Luxembourg (2004), Liechtenstein (2005), Serbia (2010) and Russia (2010).

His report on local and regional democracy in Russia (2010) recommended the reintroduction of direct elections for regional governors, making it possible to register new political parties "without the need to demonstrate an impractically large number of members", ending the use of closed lists in elections, and measures to deal with corruption.

In a report on Liechtenstein (2006), Newbury said the situation in Liechtenstein was "remarkable and indeed enviable".

He also headed election observations in Kosovo (2001), Ukraine (2002), Armenia (2002), Gagauzia, Moldova (2003), and Palestine (2005). He was rapporteur for the observation of the presidential election in Serbia of 2004, and for elections in Bosnia and Herzegovina in 2004, and took part in other election observations.

In 2000 and 2008 he represented the Congress at meetings of the Venice Commission and in 2003 was the rapporteur of the Congress on Public Ethics at the Local Level. He also served as rapporteur on the revision of the European Charter of Local Self-Government. In 2007 he was against the Kyoto Protocol.

He retired from the Congress in 2010.

== Wiltshire ==
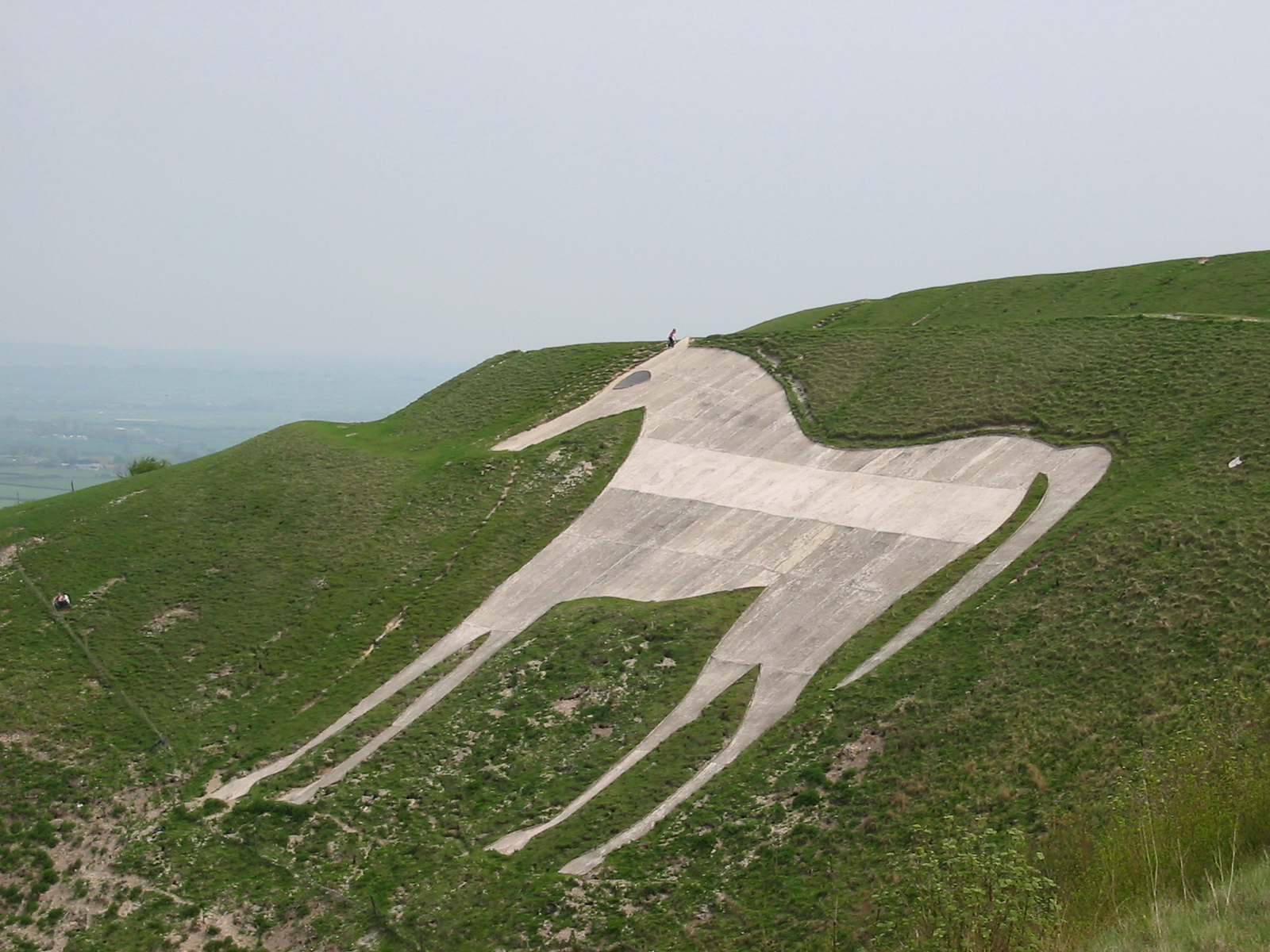
The Westbury White Horse

Newbury became a member of Wiltshire County Council in 1997. He chaired the Wiltshire Victoria County History Committee from 2002 until its winding up in 2014.

Since the 2009 election, his Wylye Valley electoral division covers the river valley south off Warminster, and parts of Salisbury Plain. He was elected in 2013 as a Conservative, but before that stood as an Independent. In 2016 he was Vote Leave Coordinator for South West Wiltshire.

He has complained about the concreting of the Westbury White Horse: "Chalk is a lovely white substance. Concrete starts out pale grey and gets less and less pale grey."

== See also ==
Wiltshire Council's banner

- 1997 Wiltshire County Council election
- 2001 Wiltshire County Council election
- 2005 Wiltshire County Council election
- 2009 Wiltshire Council election
- 2013 Wiltshire Council election
- 2017 Wiltshire Council election
- 2021 Wiltshire Council election
