= 1889 Wiltshire County Council election =

1889 English local government election

- 23 January 1889
Party	Conservative	Liberal Unionist	Independent
Party	Liberal
- The County of Wiltshire within England
Elected Party
No overall control

The first-ever Elections to Wiltshire County Council were held on 23 January 1889. Sixty members were up for election, with up to twenty more voting aldermen to be appointed by the new council.

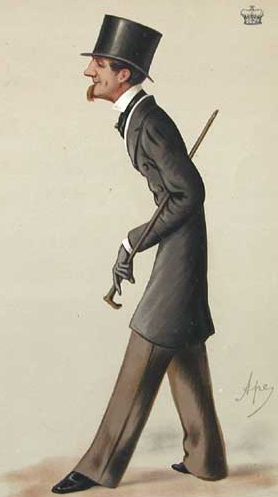
Lord Bath, first chairman

The first Chairman of the Council was John Thynne, 4th Marquess of Bath, and he remained in office until his death in 1896.

== A new authority ==
The Local Government Act 1888 created County Councils throughout England and Wales, to take over various administrative functions until then carried out by the unelected Quarter Sessions. They gained some of their powers under the Act on 1 April 1889, and their full powers on 22 September 1889. These included repairing county roads and bridges; maintaining court houses, police stations, and county halls; providing an asylum for pauper lunatics and reformatory and industrial schools; and being responsible for weights and measures and the control of contagious diseases in animals. The areas they covered were called administrative counties and were not in all cases identical to the traditional counties, but in Wiltshire the whole ceremonial county came under the authority of the new county council, as there were then no towns or cities in Wiltshire large enough to be treated as county boroughs.

A Committee on Areas and Boundaries for Wiltshire was established to draw up a scheme of electoral divisions. It was reported in October 1888 that this scheme was ready to be presented to the next Court of Quarter Sessions for approval. Elections to the council were to be held every three years on a household franchise, with sixty seats available, including three for Salisbury and one each for Devizes, Malmesbury, and Marlborough. There were also to be up to twenty voting aldermen, chosen by the councillors, holding office for six years.

== Elections and first meetings ==
The first elections to the county council were held on 23 January 1889, but only thirty-two of the seats were contested. Among those elected unopposed were the 4th Marquess of Bath, the 13th Earl of Pembroke, the 18th Earl of Suffolk, Sir Thomas Grove, 1st Baronet MP, Sir Charles Hobhouse, 4th Baronet, and Sir R. H. Pollen. The contested seats were mostly fought on party lines, and sources vary on the exact numbers elected. The Local Government Chronicle of 2 February 1889 reported 28 Liberals, 28 Conservatives, and four Liberal Unionists; a note on the fly-leaf of the County Council Minutes says 26 Liberals, 25 Conservatives, and nine Liberal Unionists. Five Labour candidates were reported to be standing as Liberals, and one, Isaac Dalley, was elected in the North Western division.

A first provisional meeting of the county council, before it gained its powers, was held at Devizes on 31 January 1889, with all of the members present, and Lord Bath was elected as chairman. Several voting aldermen were appointed, all from outside the elected members of the council. Further meetings were held in the Council House, Salisbury, on 1 April, the Town Hall, Warminster, on 1 July, and the recently built Trowbridge Town Hall, on 6 August 1889.

The new county council had many of the members of the outgoing quarter sessions. The continuity was emphasized by the leadership: Lord Bath had been chairman of the Salisbury and Warminster sessions since 1880, and his vice-chairman, Lord Edmond Fitzmaurice, had been the second chairman of the Devizes and Marlborough quarter sessions since 1887.

== See also ==
- Wiltshire County Council elections
