= 1993 Wiltshire County Council election =

1993 UK local government election

| ← 1989 | 6 May 1993 | 1997 → |

All 68 seats to Wiltshire County Council 35 seats needed for a majority
| | First party | Second party | Third party |
|---|---|---|---|
| | LD | Con | Lab |
| Party | Liberal Democrats | Conservative | Labour |
| Last election | 18 seats, 27% | 35 seats, 44% | 18 seats, 24% |
| Seats won | 33 | 18 | 17 |
| Seat change | ▲15 | ▼17 | ▼1 |
| Popular vote | 64,107 | 61,379 | 38,445 |
| Percentage | 37.5% | 36.0% | 22.5% |
| Swing | ▲10.5% | ▼8.0% | ▼1.5% |
Council control before election
No overall control
Council control after election
No overall control

Elections to Wiltshire County Council were held on 6 May 1993. The whole council was up for election and the result was no overall control, with the Liberal Democrats as the largest party. This resulted in a no-party-control shared administration for the first year of the Council, with the three main party groups being briefed on a coequal basis. Following a by-election gain by the Liberal Democrats from the Conservatives, giving the Liberal Democrats exactly half the seats on the Council, a Liberal Democrat administration was formed, but with a convention that those chairing committees would not use their casting vote.

When Swindon Borough Council was established as a new unitary authority on 1 April 1997, the members who had been elected to the county council from Haydon Wick, Highworth, Stratton St Margaret, Swindon, Wanborough, and Wroughton ceased to hold office. The size of the council fell from 68 to 47, and in the remaining month of the council's term of office the Liberal Democrats briefly gained control, but they lost it at the 1997 Wiltshire Council election, when there was a return to no overall control.

== Results ==
Wiltshire local election result 1993
| Party | Seats | Gains | Losses | Net gain/loss | Seats % | Votes % | Votes | +/− |
|---|---|---|---|---|---|---|---|---|
| Conservative | 18 | | | -17 | 26.47 | 36.0 | 61,379 | -13,697 |
| Liberal Democrats | 33 | | | +15 | 48.53 | 37.5 | 64,107 | +18,163 |
| Labour | 17 | | 1 | -1 | 25.00 | 22.5 | 38,445 | -2,013 |
| Liberal | 0 | 0 | 1 | -1 | 0.00 | 1.3 | 2,249 | -463 |
| Independent | 0 | 0 | 2 | -2 | 0.00 | 1.9 | 3,522 | -631 |
| Green | 0 | 0 | 0 | 0 | 0.00 | 0.63 | 1,079 | -1138 |

== Results by divisions ==
=== Aldbourne and Ramsbury ===
Aldbourne and Ramsbury
| Party | Candidate | Votes | % | ±% |
|---|---|---|---|---|
| Liberal Democrats | Graham Francis | 1,882 | | |
| Conservative | M. D. Abell | 1,219 | | |
| Majority | | 663 | | |
| Liberal Democrats hold | | Swing | | |

=== Alderbury ===
Alderbury
| Party | Candidate | Votes | % | ±% |
|---|---|---|---|---|
| Conservative | Charles Temple Blackwood | 1,197 | | |
| Liberal Democrats | R. J. Hardy | 1,114 | | |
| Labour | A. C. Oliver | 300 | | |
| Majority | | 83 | | |
| Conservative hold | | Swing | | |

=== Amesbury ===
Amesbury
| Party | Candidate | Votes | % | ±% |
|---|---|---|---|---|
| Liberal Democrats | John Kelsey Edgley | 1,324 | | |
| Conservative | J. C. Turner | 1,098 | | |
| Labour | P. Whiteside | 186 | | |
| Majority | | 226 | | |
| Liberal Democrats gain from Conservative | | Swing | | |

=== Avon and Cannings ===
Avon and Cannings
| Party | Candidate | Votes | % | ±% |
|---|---|---|---|---|
| Conservative | Dennis James Willmott | 1,134 | | |
| Liberal Democrats | K. M. Ben Rabha | 977 | | |
| Labour | T. J. Williams | 371 | | |
| Majority | | 157 | | |
| Conservative win (new seat) | | | | |

=== Bedwyn and Pewsey ===
Bedwyn and Pewsey
| Party | Candidate | Votes | % | ±% |
|---|---|---|---|---|
| Liberal Democrats | Jennifer Mary Scott | 1,878 | | |
| Conservative | M. Carson | 1,509 | | |
| Majority | | 369 | | |
| Liberal Democrats win (new seat) | | | | |

=== Bourne Valley ===
Bourne Valley
| Party | Candidate | Votes | % | ±% |
|---|---|---|---|---|
| Conservative | Geraldine Lesley Hibberd | 1,336 | | |
| Liberal Democrats | O. V. Tanner | 962 | | |
| Labour | I. Horton | 252 | | |
| Majority | | 374 | | |
| Conservative win (new seat) | | | | |

=== Bradford on Avon ===
Bradford on Avon
| Party | Candidate | Votes | % | ±% |
|---|---|---|---|---|
| Liberal Democrats | Victoria Christine Scott Landell Mills | 2,121 | | |
| Conservative | William Campbell Viles | 885 | | |
| Labour | E. F. Short | 398 | | |
| Majority | | 1,236 | | |
| Liberal Democrats win (new seat) | | | | |

=== Bremhill and Calne ===
Bremhill and Calne Without
| Party | Candidate | Votes | % | ±% |
|---|---|---|---|---|
| Conservative | Robert Andrew Raymond Syms | 1,343 | | |
| Liberal Democrats | Lesley Bennett | 1,232 | | |
| Labour | Susan Elizabeth Griffin | 244 | | |
| Majority | | 111 | | |
| Conservative hold | | Swing | | |

=== Calne ===
Calne
| Party | Candidate | Votes | % | ±% |
|---|---|---|---|---|
| Liberal Democrats | Jeanette Frances Greer | 922 | | |
| Conservative | Alfred Roman Ilersic | 689 | | |
| Labour | Tim David Chapman | 370 | | |
| Majority | | 233 | | |
| Liberal Democrats gain from Conservative | | Swing | | |

=== Chippenham Park ===
Chippenham Park
| Party | Candidate | Votes | % | ±% |
|---|---|---|---|---|
| Liberal Democrats | Patrick Charles Bourne Coleman | 1,888 | | |
| Conservative | Davi Keith Poole | 1,058 | | |
| Labour | Pauline Frances Kathleen Bowden | 254 | | |
| Majority | | 830 | | |
| Liberal Democrats hold | | Swing | | |

=== Chippenham Sheldon ===
Chippenham Sheldon
| Party | Candidate | Votes | % | ±% |
|---|---|---|---|---|
| Liberal Democrats | June Margaret Wood | 1,569 | | |
| Conservative | Mary Frances Elizabeth Norton | 718 | | |
| Labour | Clive Trevor Grace | 389 | | |
| Majority | | 851 | | |
| Liberal Democrats hold | | Swing | | |

=== Chippenham Town ===
Chippenham Town
| Party | Candidate | Votes | % | ±% |
|---|---|---|---|---|
| Liberal Democrats | Raymond Leonard Anscombe | 1,609 | | |
| Conservative | Richard Henry Patrick Purdon | 647 | | |
| Labour | Christopher John Phillips | 210 | | |
| Majority | | 962 | | |
| Liberal Democrats hold | | Swing | | |

=== Collingbourne ===
Collingbourne
| Party | Candidate | Votes | % | ±% |
|---|---|---|---|---|
| Liberal Democrats | Mark Connolly | 939 | | |
| Conservative | B. Davie | 794 | | |
| Majority | | 145 | | |
| Liberal Democrats gain from Conservative | | Swing | | |

=== Corsham ===
Corsham
| Party | Candidate | Votes | % | ±% |
|---|---|---|---|---|
| Liberal Democrats | Graeme Roger Potter | 1,288 | | |
| Conservative | Eric John Porter | 886 | | |
| Labour | Christine Reid | 451 | | |
| Majority | | 402 | | |
| Liberal Democrats gain from Conservative | | Swing | | |

=== Cricklade and Purton ===
Cricklade and Purton
| Party | Candidate | Votes | % | ±% |
|---|---|---|---|---|
| Liberal Democrats | Brian Edward Atfield | 1,596 | | |
| Conservative | Anthony Francis Elwood Wall | 964 | | |
| Labour | Elizabeth Clemency Saunders | 180 | | |
| Majority | | 632 | | |
| Liberal Democrats win (new seat) | | | | |

=== Devizes ===
Devizes
| Party | Candidate | Votes | % | ±% |
|---|---|---|---|---|
| Conservative | Maurice Stanley Came | 901 | | |
| Labour | C. R. Hopgood | 597 | | |
| Liberal Democrats | R. M. J. Cleal | 521 | | |
| Majority | | 304 | | |
| Conservative hold | | Swing | | |

=== Devizes South and Bromham ===
Devizes South and Bromham
| Party | Candidate | Votes | % | ±% |
|---|---|---|---|---|
| Conservative | Patricia Rugg | 1,561 | | |
| Liberal Democrats | J. Allan | 1,020 | | |
| Labour | P. E. Twaites | 381 | | |
| Majority | | 541 | | |
| Conservative win (new seat) | | | | |

=== Downton ===
Downton
| Party | Candidate | Votes | % | ±% |
|---|---|---|---|---|
| Conservative | Julian Paul Johnson | 1,447 | | |
| Labour | P. J. Leo | 874 | | |
| Green | S. M. Elcock | 417 | | |
| Majority | | 573 | | |
| Conservative hold | | Swing | | |

=== Durrington ===
Durrington
| Party | Candidate | Votes | % | ±% |
|---|---|---|---|---|
| Conservative | C. E. Robinson | 1,004 | | |
| Labour | A. F. C. Greville | 744 | | |
| Majority | | 260 | | |
| Conservative hold | | Swing | | |

=== Haydon Wick ===
Haydon Wick
| Party | Candidate | Votes | % | ±% |
|---|---|---|---|---|
| Labour | John William Hartnell Archer | 1,375 | | |
| Conservative | C. I. Butcher | 743 | | |
| Liberal Democrats | T. F. Hudson | 202 | | |
| Majority | | 632 | | |
| Labour win (new seat) | | | | |

=== Highworth ===
Highworth
| Party | Candidate | Votes | % | ±% |
|---|---|---|---|---|
| Labour | Lynn Vardy | 1,530 | | |
| Conservative | D. F. Morley | 1,135 | | |
| Liberal Democrats | J. A. Shorten | 393 | | |
| Majority | | 395 | | |
| Labour hold | | Swing | | |

=== Holt ===
Holt
| Party | Candidate | Votes | % | ±% |
|---|---|---|---|---|
| Liberal Democrats | Terrence Peter (Terry) Chivers | 1,997 | | |
| Conservative | Robert George Ian Elliott | 1,369 | | |
| Liberal | George Frederick James Hawkins | 163 | | |
| Labour | T. A. Maslen | 157 | | |
| Majority | | 628 | | |
| Liberal Democrats hold | | Swing | | |

=== Kington ===
Kington
| Party | Candidate | Votes | % | ±% |
|---|---|---|---|---|
| Liberal Democrats | Doreen Darby | 1,467 | | |
| Conservative | Peter Gordon Green | 1,430 | | |
| Labour | Peter Ernest Mellett | 145 | | |
| Majority | | 37 | | |
| Liberal Democrats gain from Conservative | | Swing | | |

=== Lavington ===
Lavington
| Party | Candidate | Votes | % | ±% |
|---|---|---|---|---|
| Conservative | Derek Bernard William Jarvis | 1,503 | | |
| Liberal Democrats | M. G. Pearce | 780 | | |
| Labour | W. M. Barnett | 373 | | |
| Liberal | R. W. Clarke | 203 | | |
| Majority | | 723 | | |
| Conservative hold | | Swing | | |

=== Malmesbury ===
Malmesbury
| Party | Candidate | Votes | % | ±% |
|---|---|---|---|---|
| Liberal Democrats | Caroline Pym | 1,945 | | |
| Conservative | Patricia Winifred Sears | 1,048 | | |
| Labour | Daphne Joy Jones | 184 | | |
| Majority | | 897 | | |
| Liberal Democrats hold | | Swing | | |

=== Marlborough ===
Marlborough
| Party | Candidate | Votes | % | ±% |
|---|---|---|---|---|
| Liberal Democrats | Fiona Gillian Webb | 1,192 | | |
| Conservative | J. M. A. Goodfellow | 968 | | |
| Independent | J. R. Ripley | 144 | | |
| Majority | | 224 | | |
| Liberal Democrats gain from Conservative | | Swing | | |

=== Melksham ===
Melksham
| Party | Candidate | Votes | % | ±% |
|---|---|---|---|---|
| Liberal Democrats | Angela Betty Barker | 1,154 | | |
| Labour | Davina M. Griffin | 1,022 | | |
| Conservative | C. E. B. V. Deadman | 473 | | |
| Majority | | 132 | | |
| Liberal Democrats gain from Labour | | Swing | | |

=== Melksham Without ===
Melksham Without
| Party | Candidate | Votes | % | ±% |
|---|---|---|---|---|
| Liberal Democrats | John Barrie Wesley | 2,252 | | |
| Conservative | E. P. Joyce | 977 | | |
| Labour | P. J. Creese | 459 | | |
| Majority | | 1,275 | | |
| Liberal Democrats hold | | Swing | | |

=== Mere ===
Mere
| Party | Candidate | Votes | % | ±% |
|---|---|---|---|---|
| Conservative | Robert George Catton | 1,179 | | |
| Liberal Democrats | U. A. McGrail | 575 | | |
| Independent | M. W. Taylor | 324 | | |
| Labour | M. J. Foote | 212 | | |
| Majority | | 604 | | |
| Conservative hold | | Swing | | |

=== Minety ===
Minety
| Party | Candidate | Votes | % | ±% |
|---|---|---|---|---|
| Conservative | Carole Alethea Soden | 2,070 | | |
| Liberal Democrats | Anthony James Doody | 1,064 | | |
| Labour | Jane Mellett | 181 | | |
| Majority | | 1,006 | | |
| Conservative win (new seat) | | | | |

=== Pickwick with Box ===
Pickwick with Box
| Party | Candidate | Votes | % | ±% |
|---|---|---|---|---|
| Conservative | Judith Helen Seager | 971 | | |
| Liberal Democrats | Roger Hubbard | 873 | | |
| Labour | Stephen Charles Wheeler | 638 | | |
| Majority | | 98 | | |
| Conservative win (new seat) | | | | |

=== Salisbury Bemerton ===
Salisbury Bemerton
| Party | Candidate | Votes | % | ±% |
|---|---|---|---|---|
| Labour | Richard Terance Rogers | 1,231 | | |
| Conservative | J. G. S. Guthrie | 477 | | |
| Independent | J. Heaney | 281 | | |
| Majority | | 754 | | |
| Labour hold | | Swing | | |

=== Salisbury Harnham ===
Salisbury Harnham
| Party | Candidate | Votes | % | ±% |
|---|---|---|---|---|
| Liberal Democrats | Alan Alfred Joel | 1,172 | | |
| Conservative | B. M. E. Rycroft | 992 | | |
| Labour | C. Bryder | 181 | | |
| Majority | | 180 | | |
| Liberal Democrats hold | | Swing | | |

=== Salisbury St Mark ===
Salisbury St Mark
| Party | Candidate | Votes | % | ±% |
|---|---|---|---|---|
| Conservative | Peter Frederick Chalke | 1,371 | | |
| Liberal Democrats | D. M. Jones | 1,011 | | |
| Labour | M. Riches | 270 | | |
| Majority | | 360 | | |
| Conservative hold | | Swing | | |

=== Salisbury St Martin ===
Salisbury St Martin
| Party | Candidate | Votes | % | ±% |
|---|---|---|---|---|
| Liberal Democrats | Paul William Leslie Sample | 1,904 | | |
| Conservative | P. V. H. Paisey | 886 | | |
| Labour | C. Davies | 285 | | |
| Green | I. Nath | 97 | | |
| Majority | | 1,018 | | |
| Liberal Democrats gain from Conservative | | Swing | | |

=== Salisbury St Paul ===
Salisbury St Paul
| Party | Candidate | Votes | % | ±% |
|---|---|---|---|---|
| Labour | Beryl Mary Jay | 1,659 | | |
| Independent | T. C. Cowie | 794 | | |
| Majority | | 865 | | |
| Labour gain from Independent | | Swing | | |

=== Southwick ===
Southwick
| Party | Candidate | Votes | % | ±% |
|---|---|---|---|---|
| Liberal Democrats | John Napier Beatson Irving | 1,330 | | |
| Conservative | Anthony Guy Phillips | 951 | | |
| Labour | D. Atherton | 182 | | |
| Majority | | 379 | | |
| Liberal Democrats gain from Conservative | | Swing | | |

=== Stratton St Margaret, Coleview and Nythe ===
Stratton St Margaret, Coleview and Nythe
| Party | Candidate | Votes | % | ±% |
|---|---|---|---|---|
| Labour | Brian Victor Cockbill | 967 | | |
| Conservative | Andrew Albinson | 596 | | |
| Liberal Democrats | A. D. Richards | 312 | | |
| Majority | | 371 | | |
| Labour gain from Conservative | | Swing | | |

=== Stratton St Margaret, St Margaret ===
Stratton St Margaret, St Margaret
| Party | Candidate | Votes | % | ±% |
|---|---|---|---|---|
| Labour | John Foley | 771 | | |
| Conservative | C. A. Day | 454 | | |
| Liberal Democrats | M. W. Hopes | 204 | | |
| Majority | | 317 | | |
| Labour hold | | Swing | | |

=== Stratton St Margaret, St Philip ===
Stratton St Margaret, St Philip
| Party | Candidate | Votes | % | ±% |
|---|---|---|---|---|
| Labour | Percival Lawrence Jefferies | 1,549 | | |
| Conservative | G. B. J. Baldwin | 355 | | |
| Green | M. Collins | 117 | | |
| Majority | | 1,194 | | |
| Labour hold | | Swing | | |

=== Swindon Central ===
Swindon Central
| Party | Candidate | Votes | % | ±% |
|---|---|---|---|---|
| Labour | Andrew Edwards | 945 | | |
| Liberal Democrats | A. Baxter | 317 | | |
| Conservative | K. M. Alam | 243 | | |
| Green | S. W. Smith | 69 | | |
| Majority | | 628 | | |
| Labour hold | | Swing | | |

=== Swindon Covingham ===
Swindon Covingham
| Party | Candidate | Votes | % | ±% |
|---|---|---|---|---|
| Labour | David Alan Oakensen | 917 | | |
| Conservative | Peter Stoddart | 367 | | |
| Liberal Democrats | -. Allen | 343 | | |
| Majority | | 550 | | |
| Labour win (new seat) | | | | |

=== Swindon Dorcan South ===
Swindon Dorcan South
| Party | Candidate | Votes | % | ±% |
|---|---|---|---|---|
| Labour | Robert Kenneth Brooks | 1,152 | | |
| Conservative | M. M. Norton | 1,142 | | |
| Majority | | 10 | | |
| Labour win (new seat) | | | | |

=== Swindon Eastcott ===
Swindon Eastcott
| Party | Candidate | Votes | % | ±% |
|---|---|---|---|---|
| Liberal Democrats | Stanley James Pajak | 1,566 | | |
| Labour | Cindy Matthews | 967 | | |
| Conservative | V. A. Butt | 295 | | |
| Green | C. Smith | 76 | | |
| Majority | | 599 | | |
| Liberal Democrats hold | | Swing | | |

=== Swindon Freshbrook ===
Swindon Freshbrook
| Party | Candidate | Votes | % | ±% |
|---|---|---|---|---|
| Liberal Democrats | Jean Melville | 957 | | |
| Labour | R. J. Cretchley | 677 | | |
| Conservative | N. C. Bristow | 645 | | |
| Majority | | 280 | | |
| Liberal Democrats hold | | Swing | | |

=== Swindon Gorse Hill ===
Swindon Gorse Hill
| Party | Candidate | Votes | % | ±% |
|---|---|---|---|---|
| Labour | Hugh S. Barnett | 1,630 | | |
| Conservative | A. F. A. Crowhurst | 308 | | |
| Liberal Democrats | J. Kurton | 206 | | |
| Majority | | 1,322 | | |
| Labour hold | | Swing | | |

=== Swindon Lawns ===
Swindon Lawns
| Party | Candidate | Votes | % | ±% |
|---|---|---|---|---|
| Conservative | Joan Barbara Prouse Savage | 1,709 | | |
| Labour | E. Edge | 748 | | |
| Liberal Democrats | S. A. Bowley-Bennett | 637 | | |
| Green | J. V. Hughes | 138 | | |
| Majority | | 961 | | |
| Conservative gain from SDP | | Swing | | |

=== Swindon Moredon ===
Swindon Moredon
| Party | Candidate | Votes | % | ±% |
|---|---|---|---|---|
| Labour | Arthur James Masters | 1,215 | | |
| Conservative | Mark James Harper | 281 | | |
| Liberal Democrats | C. R. Minns | 243 | | |
| Independent | B. L. Wilmot | 228 | | |
| Majority | | 934 | | |
| Labour hold | | Swing | | |

=== Swindon Parks ===
Swindon Parks
| Party | Candidate | Votes | % | ±% |
|---|---|---|---|---|
| Labour | Jean Norris | 1,455 | | |
| Liberal Democrats | E. Aylett | 196 | | |
| Conservative | W. R. Whitfield | 189 | | |
| Majority | | 1,259 | | |
| Labour win (new seat) | | | | |

=== Swindon Roughmoor ===
Swindon Roughmoor
| Party | Candidate | Votes | % | ±% |
|---|---|---|---|---|
| Conservative | Alan James Winmill | 632 | | |
| Liberal Democrats | A. R. Timpson | 336 | | |
| Labour | D. R. Camburn | 320 | | |
| Majority | | 296 | | |
| Conservative win (new seat) | | | | |

=== Swindon Toothill ===
Swindon Toothill
| Party | Candidate | Votes | % | ±% |
|---|---|---|---|---|
| Labour | Arthur Harry Goring | 1,000 | | |
| Conservative | P. Mallinson | 738 | | |
| Green | M. Harrison | 165 | | |
| Majority | | 262 | | |
| Labour hold | | Swing | | |

=== Swindon Walcot ===
Swindon Walcot
| Party | Candidate | Votes | % | ±% |
|---|---|---|---|---|
| Labour | Noel Robert Tostevin | 1,168 | | |
| Conservative | J. R. Stevens | 535 | | |
| Liberal Democrats | K. M. McCarthy | 246 | | |
| Majority | | 633 | | |
| Labour hold | | Swing | | |

=== Swindon Western ===
Swindon Western
| Party | Candidate | Votes | % | ±% |
|---|---|---|---|---|
| Labour | Kevin David Small | 1,752 | | |
| Conservative | G. Clark | 358 | | |
| Liberal Democrats | K. Bracey | 259 | | |
| Majority | | 1,394 | | |
| Labour hold | | Swing | | |

=== Swindon Whitworth ===
Swindon Whitworth
| Party | Candidate | Votes | % | ±% |
|---|---|---|---|---|
| Labour | David Ernest Glaholm | 1,156 | | |
| Liberal Democrats | A. D. Jacobs | 815 | | |
| Conservative | D. H. Day | 103 | | |
| Majority | | 341 | | |
| Labour hold | | Swing | | |

=== Tisbury ===
Tisbury
| Party | Candidate | Votes | % | ±% |
|---|---|---|---|---|
| Conservative | Robert John Baddeley | 1,339 | | |
| Independent | David O. Parker | 946 | | |
| Labour | C. M. Whiteside | 323 | | |
| Majority | | 393 | | |
| Conservative hold | | Swing | | |

=== Trowbridge East ===
Trowbridge East
| Party | Candidate | Votes | % | ±% |
|---|---|---|---|---|
| Liberal Democrats | Ann Virginia Lye | 1,362 | | |
| Conservative | S. J. Kirk | 677 | | |
| Labour | W. Stallard | 430 | | |
| Majority | | 685 | | |
| Liberal Democrats hold | | Swing | | |

=== Trowbridge South ===
Trowbridge South
| Party | Candidate | Votes | % | ±% |
|---|---|---|---|---|
| Liberal Democrats | Grace Hill | 1,517 | | |
| Conservative | Peter Fuller | 590 | | |
| Labour | J. E. Baddeley | 372 | | |
| Majority | | 927 | | |
| Liberal Democrats hold | | Swing | | |

=== Trowbridge West ===
Trowbridge West
| Party | Candidate | Votes | % | ±% |
|---|---|---|---|---|
| Liberal Democrats | Nicholas Shawne Edney Westbrook | 993 | | |
| Conservative | Rosemary A. Webber | 443 | | |
| Labour | D. A. Machin | 227 | | |
| Liberal | M. A. Phillips | 171 | | |
| Majority | | 550 | | |
| Liberal Democrats hold | | Swing | | |

=== Upper Wylye Valley ===
Upper Wylye Valley
| Party | Candidate | Votes | % | ±% |
|---|---|---|---|---|
| Conservative | John William Finlay Robins | 1,128 | | |
| Liberal | S. J. Dancey | 806 | | |
| Labour | A. Knight | 264 | | |
| Majority | | 322 | | |
| Conservative hold | | Swing | | |

=== Wanborough ===
Wanborough
| Party | Candidate | Votes | % | ±% |
|---|---|---|---|---|
| Liberal Democrats | Jane Lindsay Mactaggart | 1,500 | | |
| Conservative | J. W. J. Legge | 1,184 | | |
| Labour | R. J. Smith | 300 | | |
| Majority | | 316 | | |
| Liberal Democrats hold | | Swing | | |

=== Warminster East ===
Warminster East
| Party | Candidate | Votes | % | ±% |
|---|---|---|---|---|
| Conservative | Dorothea Joan Main | 897 | | |
| Liberal Democrats | V. A. Rayner | 555 | | |
| Liberal | Paul I. MacDonald | 368 | | |
| Labour | James Philip Knight | 362 | | |
| Majority | | 342 | | |
| Conservative hold | | Swing | | |

=== Warminster West ===
Warminster West
| Party | Candidate | Votes | % | ±% |
|---|---|---|---|---|
| Liberal Democrats | John Edward Syme | 963 | | |
| Conservative | M. Ultan Ryan | 801 | | |
| Labour | R. Keddie | 365 | | |
| Liberal | M. J. Barker | 270 | | |
| Majority | | 162 | | |
| Liberal Democrats gain from Liberal | | Swing | | |

=== Westbury ===
Westbury
| Party | Candidate | Votes | % | ±% |
|---|---|---|---|---|
| Liberal Democrats | Gordon Ian King | 1,228 | | |
| Conservative | M. Clegg | 900 | | |
| Labour | Candy Atherton | 728 | | |
| Liberal | F. J. Creese | 171 | | |
| Majority | | 328 | | |
| Liberal Democrats gain from Labour | | Swing | | |

=== Whorwellsdown ===
Whorwellsdown
| Party | Candidate | Votes | % | ±% |
|---|---|---|---|---|
| Liberal Democrats | Douglas Malcolm Firmager | 1,775 | | |
| Conservative | Gareth Roberts | 1,106 | | |
| Labour | Michael Sutton | 120 | | |
| Liberal | J. F. Hardingham | 97 | | |
| Majority | | 669 | | |
| Liberal Democrats gain from Conservative | | Swing | | |

=== Wilton and Wylye ===
Wilton and Wylye
| Party | Candidate | Votes | % | ±% |
|---|---|---|---|---|
| Liberal Democrats | Ian Clive West | 1,866 | | |
| Conservative | S. F. Ryan | 973 | | |
| Independent | Marjorie Whitworth | 553 | | |
| Independent | Timothy Ingle Abbott | 252 | | |
| Labour | R. H. Pelling | 105 | | |
| Majority | | 893 | | |
| Liberal Democrats win (new seat) | | | | |

=== Wootton Bassett North ===
Wootton Bassett North
| Party | Candidate | Votes | % | ±% |
|---|---|---|---|---|
| Liberal Democrats | Eric Henry Hodges | 1,019 | | |
| Conservative | Christine Crisp | 827 | | |
| Labour | Brian John Bayton | 100 | | |
| Majority | | 192 | | |
| Liberal Democrats hold | | Swing | | |

=== Wootton Bassett South ===
Wootton Bassett South
| Party | Candidate | Votes | % | ±% |
|---|---|---|---|---|
| Liberal Democrats | Daphne Joyce Matthews | 1,220 | | |
| Conservative | Roy Elderkin | 1,079 | | |
| Labour | Paula Ann Whitehead | 228 | | |
| Majority | | 141 | | |
| Liberal Democrats gain from Conservative | | Swing | | |

=== Wroughton ===
Wroughton
| Party | Candidate | Votes | % | ±% |
|---|---|---|---|---|
| Liberal Democrats | Aliette Cayley Phipps | 1,328 | | |
| Conservative | W. Morton | 618 | | |
| Labour | D. G. Carver | 292 | | |
| Majority | | 710 | | |
| Liberal Democrats hold | | Swing | | |
