= 1989 Wiltshire County Council election =

1989 UK local government election

← 1985	4 May 1989	1993 →

All 75 seats in Wiltshire County Council 38 seats needed for a majority
	First party	Second party	Third party
Party	Conservative	SLD	Labour
Seats won	35	18	18
Popular vote	75,076	45,944	40,458
Percentage	44.0%	27.0%	24.0%
	Fourth party	Fifth party	Sixth party
Party	Independent	Liberal	SDP
Seats won	2	1	1
Popular vote	4,153	2,712	1,143
Percentage	2.4%	1.6%	0.7%
Swing		New	New

Elections to Wiltshire County Council were held on 4 May 1989. The whole council was up for election and the result was no overall control.

== Results ==
Wiltshire local election result 1989
Party	Seats	Gains	Losses	Net gain/loss	Seats %	Votes %	Votes	+/−
Conservative	35				46.67	44.0	75,076	
Liberal Democrats	18				24.0	27.0	45,944	
Labour	18				24.0	24.0	40,458	
Independent	2				2.67	2.4	4,153	
Liberal	1				1.33	1.6	2,712	
SDP	1				1.33	0.67	1,143	
Green	0	0	0	0	0.0	1.3	2,217	0

== Results by divisions ==
=== Aldbourne and Ramsbury ===
Aldbourne and Ramsbury
Party	Candidate	Votes	%	±%
Liberal Democrats	John Bernard Ainslie	1,951		
Conservative	R. E. Wilkins	1,010		
Majority		941		
Liberal Democrats hold		Swing		

=== Alderbury ===
Alderbury
Party	Candidate	Votes	%	±%
Conservative	A. W. M. Christie-Miller	1,511		
Labour	I. Horton	343		
Majority		1,168		
Conservative hold		Swing		

=== Amesbury ===
Amesbury
Party	Candidate	Votes	%	±%
Conservative	N. I. C. Kettlewell	1,126		
Liberal Democrats	A. J. F. Haywood	1,043		
Labour	R. H. Pelling	255		
Majority		83		
Conservative gain from Liberal Democrats		Swing		

=== Bedwyn ===
Bedwyn
Party	Candidate	Votes	%	±%
Conservative	H. D. Rogers	1,130		
Liberal Democrats	Jennifer Mary Scott	976		
Majority		154		
Conservative hold		Swing		

=== Blunsdon ===
Blunsdon
Party	Candidate	Votes	%	±%
Labour	J. W. H. Archer	1,580		
Conservative	M. J. Rutland	1,200		
Liberal Democrats	D. Couch	252		
Majority		380		
Liberal Democrats hold		Swing		

=== Box ===
Box
Party	Candidate	Votes	%	±%
Conservative	Vernon Ross Phillips	1,157		
Liberal Democrats	Doreen Darby	787		
Labour	Christine Reid	539		
Majority		370		
Conservative hold		Swing		

=== Bradford on Avon North ===
Bradford on Avon North
Party	Candidate	Votes	%	±%
Conservative	Robert George Ian Elliott	1,375		
Liberal Democrats	H. J. Owen	1,226		
Labour	I. L. Pyper	412		
Majority		149		
Conservative gain from Liberal Democrats		Swing		

=== Bradford on Avon South ===
Bradford on Avon South
Party	Candidate	Votes	%	±%
Liberal Democrats	Victoria Christine Landell Mills	1,060		
Conservative	M. Purves	1,030		
Labour	J. D. Childs	347		
Majority		30		
Labour hold		Swing		

=== Bremhill and Calne Without ===
Bremhill and Calne Without
Party	Candidate	Votes	%	±%
Conservative	Robert Andrew Raymond Syms	1,683		
Liberal Democrats	Ascott Thomas Harris	606		
Labour	David John Songhurst	211		
Majority		1,077		
Conservative hold		Swing		

=== Brinkworth ===
Brinkworth
Party	Candidate	Votes	%	±%
Conservative	Carole Alethea Soden	1,838		
Liberal Democrats	Arthur Richard Chapman	482		
Labour	Brian Bayton	166		
Majority		1,356		
Conservative hold		Swing		

=== Calne ===
Calne
Party	Candidate	Votes	%	±%
Conservative	Alfred Roman Ilersic	1,121		
Liberal Democrats	George Andrew Macpherson	1,059		
Labour	John Cameron-Churchill	302		
Majority		62		
Conservative gain from Liberal Democrats		Swing		

=== Chippenham Park ===
Chippenham Park
Party	Candidate	Votes	%	±%
Liberal Democrats	Patrick Charles Bourne Coleman	881		
Conservative	Peter Coupe Blackburn	790		
Labour	John Chambers	183		
Majority		91		
Liberal Democrats hold		Swing		

=== Chippenham Sheldon ===
Chippenham Sheldon
Party	Candidate	Votes	%	±%
Liberal Democrats	June Margaret Wood	1,104		
Conservative	Donald Ellis	997		
Labour	Maureen Frances Lloyd	844		
Majority		107		
Liberal Democrats hold		Swing		

=== Chippenham Town ===
Chippenham Town
Party	Candidate	Votes	%	±%
Liberal Democrats	Stephen Paul Spear	1,778		
Conservative	Francis Bowen-Easley	1,278		
Labour	Linda Gladys Faulkner	355		
Majority		500		
Liberal Democrats hold		Swing		

=== Collingbourne ===
Collingbourne
Party	Candidate	Votes	%	±%
Conservative	M. Rowland	801		
Liberal Democrats	E. Colvin	649		
Labour	S. P. Bates	242		
Majority		152		
Conservative gain from Liberal Democrats		Swing		

=== Corsham ===
Corsham
Party	Candidate	Votes	%	±%
Conservative	John Bright	1,068		
Liberal Democrats	Arthur Stanley Roy Jackson	815		
Labour	Elizabeth Cleo Saunders	197		
Majority		253		
Conservative hold		Swing		

=== Cricklade ===
Cricklade
Party	Candidate	Votes	%	±%
Liberal Democrats	Reginald John Coole	1,320		
Conservative	Roy Gladden-Hawes	736		
Labour	David Hulme	85		
Majority		584		
Liberal Democrats hold		Swing		

=== Devizes ===
Devizes
Party	Candidate	Votes	%	±%
Conservative	Maurice Stanley Came	1,062		
Liberal Democrats	P. A. Morris	588		
Labour	P. W. Rees	524		
Majority		474		
Conservative hold		Swing		

=== Devizes South and Cannings ===
Devizes South and Cannings
Party	Candidate	Votes	%	±%
Conservative	Patricia Rugg	1,909		
Labour	T. J. Williams	750		
Majority		1,159		
Conservative hold		Swing		

=== Downton ===
Downton
Party	Candidate	Votes	%	±%
Conservative	A. J. Jones	1,256		
Green	S. M. Elcock	458		
Labour	P. Clegg	364		
Majority		798		
Conservative hold		Swing		

=== Durrington ===
Durrington
Party	Candidate	Votes	%	±%
Conservative	C. E. Robinson	1,002		
Labour	J. H. Priest	416		
Liberal Democrats	G. Charkin	337		
Independent	A. J. Read	91		
Majority		586		
Conservative hold		Swing		

=== Highworth ===
Highworth
Party	Candidate	Votes	%	±%
Labour	M. V. Haines	2,000		
Conservative	D. F. Morley	1,240		
Majority		760		
Labour hold		Swing		

=== Holt ===
Holt
Party	Candidate	Votes	%	±%
Liberal Democrats	George Frederick James Hawkins	1,304		
Conservative	J. Taylor	1,088		
Majority		216		
Liberal Democrats hold		Swing		

=== Idmiston ===
Idmiston
Party	Candidate	Votes	%	±%
Conservative	M. W. Ponsonby	1,157		
Green	M. C. Pafford	353		
Labour	M. Riches	332		
Majority		804		
Conservative hold		Swing		

=== Kington ===
Kington
Party	Candidate	Votes	%	±%
Conservative	Brenda Margaret Wyrill	1,120		
Liberal Democrats	Ruth Coleman	844		
Labour	Jane Muir Mellett	147		
Majority		276		
Conservative gain from Liberal Democrats		Swing		

=== Laverstock ===
Laverstock
Party	Candidate	Votes	%	±%
Conservative	R. C. Lodge	1,132		
Liberal Democrats	Paul William Leslie Sample	1,070		
Labour	T. Thornton	139		
Majority		62		
Conservative hold		Swing		

=== Lavington ===
Lavington
Party	Candidate	Votes	%	±%
Conservative	Derek Bernard William Jarvis	1,401		
Independent	M. G. James	705		
Labour	B. R. Waker	361		
Majority		696		
Conservative hold		Swing		

=== Malmesbury ===
Malmesbury
Party	Candidate	Votes	%	±%
Liberal Democrats	Caroline Pym	1,856		
Conservative	Raymond Francis Sanderson	1,424		
Labour	Christopher John Phillips	146		
Majority		432		
Liberal Democrats hold		Swing		

=== Marlborough ===
Marlborough
Party	Candidate	Votes	%	±%
Conservative	J. M. A. Goodfellow	1,242		
Liberal Democrats	J. E. Western	1,049		
Independent	M. R. Urquhart	239		
Majority		193		
Conservative gain from Liberal Democrats		Swing		

=== Melksham ===
Melksham
Party	Candidate	Votes	%	±%
Labour	Mary E. Salisbury	1,754		
Conservative	J. H. S. Wilkinson	737		
Majority		1,017		
Labour hold		Swing		

=== Melksham Without ===
Melksham Without
Party	Candidate	Votes	%	±%
Liberal Democrats	John Barrie Wesley	2,139		
Conservative	E. P. Joyce	1,392		
Majority		747		
Liberal Democrats gain from Conservative		Swing		

=== Mere ===
Mere
Party	Candidate	Votes	%	±%
Conservative	Robert George Catton	1,356		
Liberal Democrats	T. J. Stroud	612		
Labour	M. Foote	231		
Majority		744		
Conservative hold		Swing		

=== Pewsey and Enford ===
Pewsey and Enford
Party	Candidate	Votes	%	±%
Conservative	M. Carson	1,385		
Liberal Democrats	J. E. H. Church	837		
Labour	S. J. Buxton	390		
Majority		548		
Conservative gain from Liberal Democrats		Swing		

=== Pewsham ===
Pewsham
Party	Candidate	Votes	%	±%
Conservative	Peter Gorton Green	998		
Liberal Democrats	Reuben Cook Hayward	497		
Green	Edward Barham	199		
Labour	John McKellor Reid	89		
Majority		501		
Conservative hold		Swing		

=== Potterne ===
Potterne
Party	Candidate	Votes	%	±%
Conservative	E. R. Breach	1,176		
Labour	G. S. Evans	572		
Majority		604		
Conservative hold		Swing		

=== Purton ===
Purton
Party	Candidate	Votes	%	±%
Conservative	Esme Maureen Smith	1,268		
Labour	Brian Cooke	319		
Majority		949		
Conservative hold		Swing		

=== Salisbury Bemerton ===
Salisbury Bemerton
Party	Candidate	Votes	%	±%
Labour	Richard Terance Rogers	795		
Liberal Democrats	E. M. Grant	684		
Conservative	P. M. Roche	493		
Green	R. Perry	80		
Majority		111		
Labour hold		Swing		

=== Salisbury Harnham ===
Salisbury Harnham
Party	Candidate	Votes	%	±%
Liberal Democrats	G. S. Condliffe	1,275		
Conservative	G. C. Jones	1,173		
Labour	H. M. S. Bullman	211		
Majority		102		
Liberal Democrats hold		Swing		

=== Salisbury St Mark ===
Salisbury St Mark
Party	Candidate	Votes	%	±%
Conservative	Peter Frederick Chalke	1,544		
Liberal Democrats	D. J. Howells	1,036		
Labour	S. M. Constant	204		
Majority		508		
Conservative hold		Swing		

=== Salisbury St Martin ===
Salisbury St Martin
Party	Candidate	Votes	%	±%
Conservative	P. V. H. Paisey	701		
Labour	M. K. D. Mottram	358		
Independent	J. Burden	310		
Liberal Democrats	D. H. Gammon	300		
SDP	P. N. Bunce	102		
Green	S. J. Fyfe	82		
Majority		343		
Conservative hold		Swing		

=== Salisbury St Paul ===
Salisbury St Paul
Party	Candidate	Votes	%	±%
Independent	T. C. Cowie	905		
Conservative	G. C. Tudhope	573		
Labour	M. F. Sheehan	508		
Liberal Democrats	J. P. Abbott	296		
Majority		332		
Independent hold		Swing		

=== Shrewton ===
Shrewton
Party	Candidate	Votes	%	±%
Conservative	S. F. Ryan	1,184		
Liberal Democrats	I. C. West	1,154		
Labour	G. White	134		
Majority		30		
Conservative hold		Swing		

=== Southwick ===
Southwick
Party	Candidate	Votes	%	±%
Conservative	Anthony Guy Phillips	867		
Liberal Democrats	Gordon Ian King	783		
Labour	N. Apps	319		
Majority		84		
Conservative hold		Swing		

=== Stratton St Margaret, Coleview and Nythe ===
Stratton St Margaret, Coleview and Nythe
Party	Candidate	Votes	%	±%
Conservative	M. B. Bawden	1,197		
Labour	Brian Victor Cockbill	935		
Liberal Democrats	B. A. Berry	382		
Majority		262		
Conservative gain from Liberal Democrats		Swing		

=== Stratton St Margaret, St Margaret ===
Stratton St Margaret, St Margaret
Party	Candidate	Votes	%	±%
Labour	John Foley	880		
Conservative	F. W. Richards	764		
Majority		116		
Labour gain from Liberal Democrats		Swing		

=== Stratton St Margaret, St Philip ===
Stratton St Margaret, St Philip
Party	Candidate	Votes	%	±%
Labour	Percival Lawrence Jefferies	1,738		
Conservative	R. B. W. Membry	465		
Majority		1,273		
Labour hold		Swing		

=== Swindon Central ===
Swindon Central
Party	Candidate	Votes	%	±%
Labour	S. A. Reiner	1,387		
Conservative	R. J. Mullins	304		
Liberal Democrats	R. W. Green	128		
Green	L. E. Haywood	112		
Majority		1,083		
Labour hold		Swing		

=== Swindon Eastcott ===
Swindon Eastcott
Party	Candidate	Votes	%	±%
Liberal Democrats	Stanley James Pajak	1,197		
Labour	N. P. Reilly	979		
Conservative	N. Hocking	582		
Green	H. M. Polak	163		
Independent	C. R. Gillard	73		
Majority		218		
Liberal Democrats hold		Swing		

=== Swindon Eldene ===
Swindon Eldene
Party	Candidate	Votes	%	±%
Labour	Peter C. Brown	857		
Conservative	W. R. Whitfield	280		
Liberal Democrats	A. Field	57		
Majority		577		
Labour hold		Swing		

=== Swindon Freshbrook ===
Swindon Freshbrook
Party	Candidate	Votes	%	±%
Liberal Democrats	Simon R. Cordon	1,160		
Labour	David. A. Oakensen	825		
Conservative	F. Troughton	593		
Majority		335		
Liberal Democrats gain from Labour		Swing		

=== Swindon Gorsehill ===
Swindon Gorsehill
Party	Candidate	Votes	%	±%
Labour	Arthur James Masters	1,672		
Liberal Democrats	D. J. Daly	388		
Conservative	A. F. Crowhurst	301		
Green	S. Thompson	133		
Majority		1,284		
Labour hold		Swing		

=== Swindon Lawns ===
Swindon Lawns
Party	Candidate	Votes	%	±%
SDP	Wendy. E. Johnson	1,041		
Conservative	J. B. Savage	963		
Majority		78		
SDP gain from Liberal Democrats		Swing		

=== Swindon Liden ===
Swindon Liden
Party	Candidate	Votes	%	±%
Labour	J. E. D'Avila	764		
Conservative	L. E. Laytham	614		
Liberal Democrats	J. G. Turner	171		
Majority		150		
Labour hold		Swing		

=== Swindon Moredon ===
Swindon Moredon
Party	Candidate	Votes	%	±%
Labour	Valerie Jean Small	1,400		
Conservative	P. M. Harden	464		
Majority		936		
Labour hold		Swing		

=== Swindon Park North ===
Swindon Park North
Party	Candidate	Votes	%	±%
Labour	Arthur Harry Goring	863		
Conservative	R. J. Chadwick	179		
Majority		684		
Labour hold		Swing		

=== Swindon Park South ===
Swindon Park South
Party	Candidate	Votes	%	±%
Labour	Jean Norris	808		
Conservative	S. J. Dickinson	145		
Liberal Democrats	E. M. O'Sullivan	89		
Majority		663		
Labour hold		Swing		

=== Swindon South ===
Swindon South
Party	Candidate	Votes	%	±%
Conservative	Robert Kenneth Savage	1,118		
Labour	Robert K. Brooks	362		
Green	J. V. Hughes	295		
Liberal Democrats	J. Keepin	116		
Majority		756		
Conservative hold		Swing		

=== Swindon Toothill ===
Swindon Toothill
Party	Candidate	Votes	%	±%
Labour	Alan J. Winmill	1,563		
Conservative	A. Mortel	1,220		
Majority		343		
Labour hold		Swing		

=== Swindon Walcot ===
Swindon Walcot
Party	Candidate	Votes	%	±%
Labour	Roger D. Green	1,248	61.5%	
Conservative	D. Dungey	589	29.1%	
Liberal Democrats	Z. B. Sarnowski	191	9.4%	
Majority		659		
Labour hold		Swing		

=== Swindon Western ===
Swindon Western
Party	Candidate	Votes	%	±%
Labour	Kevin David Small	1,572		
Conservative	N. Coome	623		
Liberal Democrats	V. Lo	212		
Majority		949		
Labour hold		Swing		

=== Swindon Whitworth ===
Swindon Whitworth
Party	Candidate	Votes	%	±%
Labour	David Ernest Glaholm	905		
Liberal Democrats	J. A. Thipthorpe	720		
Conservative	D. H. Day	145		
Green	H. R. Stredder	72		
Majority		185		
Labour gain from Liberal Democrats		Swing		

=== Tisbury ===
Tisbury
Party	Candidate	Votes	%	±%
Conservative	Robert John Baddeley	1,411		
Independent	David O. Parker	438		
Labour	M. D. Ayres	313		
Green	D. Davies	270		
Majority		973		
Conservative hold		Swing		

=== Trowbridge East ===
Trowbridge East
Party	Candidate	Votes	%	±%
Liberal Democrats	F. W. Stacey	1,250		
Conservative	N. D. Stafford	951		
Labour	R. M. Boniface	404		
Majority		299		
Liberal Democrats hold		Swing		

=== Trowbridge South ===
Trowbridge South
Party	Candidate	Votes	%	±%
Liberal Democrats	Grace Hill	1,223		
Conservative	G. H. Scobie	917		
Labour	D. G. Turley	581		
Majority		306		
Liberal Democrats gain from Conservative		Swing		

=== Trowbridge West ===
Trowbridge West
Party	Candidate	Votes	%	±%
Liberal Democrats	F. W. Tredrea	779		
Conservative	P. Ainley	501		
Labour	T. Pritchett	326		
Majority		278		
Liberal Democrats hold		Swing		

=== Upper Wylye Valley ===
Upper Wylye Valley
Party	Candidate	Votes	%	±%
Conservative	John William Finlay Robins	1,248		
Liberal	John Edward Syme	721		
Labour	R. J. Guy	265		
Majority		527		
Conservative hold		Swing		

=== Wanborough ===
Wanborough
Party	Candidate	Votes	%	±%
Liberal Democrats	Jane Lindsay Mactaggart	1,118		
Conservative	J. W. J. Legge	1,085		
Labour	C. P. Whiteway	568		
Majority		33		
Liberal Democrats hold		Swing		

=== Warminster East ===
Warminster East
Party	Candidate	Votes	%	±%
Conservative	Dorothea Joan Main	1,093		
Liberal	Paul I. MacDonald	977		
Majority		116		
Conservative gain from Independent		Swing		

=== Warminster West ===
Warminster West
Party	Candidate	Votes	%	±%
Liberal	S. Dancey	1,014		
Conservative	W. D. Grey	944		
Labour	K. D. Dawson	289		
Majority		70		
Liberal gain from Conservative		Swing		

=== Westbury ===
Westbury
Party	Candidate	Votes	%	±%
Labour	William F. Vivash	1,687		
Conservative	John Frederick Clegg	1,150		
Majority		537		
Labour hold		Swing		

=== Whorwellsdown ===
Whorwellsdown
Party	Candidate	Votes	%	±%
Conservative	Gareth Roberts	1,432		
Liberal Democrats	S. M. Masters	908		
Majority		524		
Conservative hold		Swing		

=== Wilton ===
Wilton
Party	Candidate	Votes	%	±%
Independent	Marjorie Whitworth	1,071		
Independent	Timothy Ingle Abbott	321		
Labour	C. D. Engel	236		
Majority		750		
Independent hold		Swing		

=== Wootton Bassett North ===
Wootton Bassett North
Party	Candidate	Votes	%	±%
Liberal Democrats	Eric Henry Hodges	812		
Conservative	Thomas Alan Scott	585		
Labour	Paula Anne Whitehead	79		
Majority		227		
Liberal Democrats hold		Swing		

=== Wootton Bassett South ===
Wootton Bassett South
Party	Candidate	Votes	%	±%
Conservative	Roy Elderkin	1,183		
Liberal Democrats	Daphne Joyce Matthews	1,074		
Labour	Iris Bayton	171		
Majority		109		
Conservative gain from Liberal Democrats		Swing		

=== Wroughton ===
Wroughton
Party	Candidate	Votes	%	±%
Liberal Democrats	Aliette Cayley Phipps	1,318		
Conservative	I. M. Morton	899		
Majority		419		
Liberal Democrats gain from Conservative		Swing		
