= Mary Salisbury =

English Labour politician

Mary Ethel Salisbury CBE DL JP (1917 – 27 October 2008), previously Mary Ethel Wilkinson, was an English Labour politician in Wiltshire County Council, serving for three years as its first woman Chairman.

== Life ==
Born in 1917 in a mining village in County Durham, one of six children, she began life as Mary Wilkinson and in 1928 won a scholarship to Bishop Auckland County School for Girls. She later trained as a nurse.

During the Second World War she was a nurse at Battle Hospital in Reading, Berkshire, where she met and in 1942 married Bob Salisbury. They moved to Melksham, Wiltshire, in 1947 and joined the local Labour Party soon after that.

In 1954, Salisbury was elected to Melksham Urban District Council, and later to Wiltshire County Council. In 1960 she became a Justice of the Peace for Wiltshire. In 1982 she was appointed a Commander of the Order of the British Empire for services to local government, and in January 1983 was Gazetted a Deputy Lieutenant for Wiltshire, together with Lord Margadale. She was also a member of the Wiltshire Victoria County History Committee.

When the Conservatives lost control of Wiltshire County Council at the 1985 elections, resulting in a hung council, Salisbury commented to The Times that there was virtually nothing which she opposed in Jack Ainslie's plan for a new Liberal-SDP administration and almost nothing on which she agreed with the defeated Conservatives. "Where the Liberals put forward measures which seem to be beneficial to the people of Wiltshire, we will support them", she said. With the council remaining hung, she went on to become the first woman Chairman of Council, holding that office from 1989 until 1992. She was a member of the county council for thirty-eight years, and was also a member of the Wiltshire and Swindon Fire Authority, standing down from both in 2001.

She died at the age of ninety on 27 October 2008, and a service of thanksgiving for her life was held at St Michael and All Angels Church, Melksham, in December 2008.

== See also ==
Wiltshire County Council's banner

- List of chairmen of Wiltshire County Council
- 1973 Wiltshire County Council election
- 1989 Wiltshire County Council election
- 1997 Wiltshire County Council election
