= 2001 Wiltshire County Council election =

2001 UK local government election

- 7 June 2001

All 47 seats to Wiltshire County Council 24 seats needed for a majority
	First party	Second party	Third party
	Con	LD	Lab
Party	Conservative	Liberal Democrats	Labour
Last election	22 seats, 43.4%	20 seats, 35.2%	4 seats, 18.3%
Seats won	28	14	3
Seat change	▲6	▼6	▼1
Popular vote	91,827	70,788	35,595
Percentage	43.7%	33.7%	16.9%
Swing	▲0.3%	▼1.5%	▼1.4%
	Fourth party
	Ind
Party	Independent
Last election	1 seat, 1.6%
Seats won	2
Seat change	▲1
Popular vote	4,712
Percentage	2.2%
Swing	▲0.6%
Council control before election
Conservative
Council control after election
Conservative

Elections to Wiltshire County Council were held on 7 June 2001. The whole council was up for election and the Conservatives held onto control.

As with other county elections in England, these local elections in Wiltshire took place on the same day as the 2001 United Kingdom general election.

== Results ==
Wiltshire local election result 2001
Party	Seats	Gains	Losses	Net gain/loss	Seats %	Votes %	Votes	+/−
Conservative	28			▲6	59.57	43.67	91,827	
Liberal Democrats	14			▼6	29.79	33.67	70,788	
Labour	3			▼1	6.38	16.93	35,595	
Independent	2			▲1	4.26	2.24	4,712	
Green	0			Steady	0.00	3.49	7,344	

== Results by divisions ==
=== Aldbourne and Ramsbury ===
Aldbourne and Ramsbury
Party	Candidate	Votes	%	±%
Conservative	Christopher Paul Humphries	2,873		
Liberal Democrats	William Bernard Cavill	1,265		
Labour	Frank Jeffrey	738		
Majority		1,608		
Conservative hold		Swing		

=== Alderbury ===
Alderbury
Party	Candidate	Votes	%	±%
Conservative	William Raybould Moss	2,577		
Liberal Democrats	Malcolm Ian Adams	1,698		
Labour	Malcolm Anthony Simmons	541		
Majority		879		
Conservative hold		Swing		

=== Amesbury ===
Amesbury
Party	Candidate	Votes	%	±%
Conservative	Allan Godfrey Peach	2,386		
Liberal Democrats	June Smith	1,009		
Labour	Damian Joseph Luke McCabe	806		
Green	Peter Torquil George Matthews	206		
Majority		1,377		
Conservative hold		Swing		

=== Avon and Cannings ===
Avon and Cannings
Party	Candidate	Votes	%	±%
Conservative	Anthony Molland	2,284		
Liberal Democrats	John Francis Thomson	990		
Labour	Colin Robert Hopgood	978		
Green	Ronald Keith Bright	309		
Majority		1,294		
Conservative hold		Swing		

=== Bedwyn and Pewsey ===
Bedwyn and Pewsey
Party	Candidate	Votes	%	±%
Conservative	David Lay	2,926		
Liberal Democrats	David John Walker	1,708		
Labour	Alistair Bisatt	902		
Majority		1,218		
Conservative gain from Liberal Democrats		Swing		

=== Bourne Valley ===
Bourne Valley
Party	Candidate	Votes	%	±%
Conservative	Kevin Christopher Wren	2,909		
Liberal Democrats	Joan Heaney	1,271		
Labour	Amanda Grace Pettefar	774		
Green	Barry James Stringer	231		
Majority		1,638		
Conservative hold		Swing		

=== Bradford on Avon ===
Bradford on Avon
Party	Candidate	Votes	%	±%
Liberal Democrats	Malcolm George Hewson	2,287		
Conservative	Bryan Earp	1,763		
Labour	James Tracey	846		
Green	John Pearce	370		
Majority		524		
Liberal Democrats hold		Swing		

=== Bremhill and Calne ===
Bremhill and Calne
Party	Candidate	Votes	%	±%
Conservative	Christine Crisp	3,178		
Liberal Democrats	Sylvia Kathleen Doubell	2,170		
Green	Harry Lewis	644		
Majority		1,218		
Conservative hold		Swing		

=== Calne ===
Calne
Party	Candidate	Votes	%	±%
Conservative	Nancy Suzanne Bryant	1,820		
Liberal Democrats	Joanna Heselwood	1,144		
Labour	John Peter Watkins	1,103		
Green	Derek Alan Quinn	317		
Majority				
Conservative hold		Swing		

=== Chippenham Park ===
Chippenham Park
Party	Candidate	Votes	%	±%
Liberal Democrats	Patrick Charles Bourne Coleman	2,211		
Conservative	Anthony Walter Smith	1,462		
Labour	Maurice George Wood	745		
Green	Maxine Burchell	222		
Majority		436		
Liberal Democrats hold		Swing		

=== Chippenham Sheldon ===
Chippenham Sheldon
Party	Candidate	Votes	%	±%
Liberal Democrats	Sandra Elizabeth (Sandie) Webb	1,588		
Conservative	Ian Barry Bridges	1,167		
Labour	Maureen Frances Lloyd	1,262		
Majority		326		
Liberal Democrats hold		Swing		

=== Chippenham Town ===
Chippenham Town
Party	Candidate	Votes	%	±%
Liberal Democrats	Philip George Allnatt	2,111		
Conservative	John Richard Ireland	1,699		
Labour	Brian Odran Healy	718		
Green	Sheila Veitch	236		
Majority		219		
Liberal Democrats hold		Swing		

=== Collingbourne ===
Collingbourne
Party	Candidate	Votes	%	±%
Conservative	Mark Connolly	1,990		
Labour	Andrew Edwards	850		
Liberal Democrats	John David Bowen-Jones	608		
Independent	Anthony Hadland Still	346		
Majority		1,140		
Conservative gain from Liberal Democrats		Swing		

=== Corsham ===
Corsham
Party	Candidate	Votes	%	±%
Liberal Democrats	Peter Roy Davis	1,754		
Conservative	Richard Leslie Tonge	1,502		
Labour	Lucy Katharine Bray	602		
Majority		252		
Liberal Democrats hold		Swing		

=== Cricklade and Purton ===
Cricklade and Purton
Party	Candidate	Votes	%	±%
Liberal Democrats	Brian Edward Atfield	1,978		
Conservative	Anthony Charles Clements	1,880		
Labour	Frederick Albert Price	488		
Majority		98		
Liberal Democrats hold		Swing		

=== Devizes ===
Devizes
Party	Candidate	Votes	%	±%
Labour	Margaret Sheila Nancy Taylor	1,729		
Conservative	Charles Stuart Winchcombe	1,322		
Liberal Democrats	Katherine Jane Walling	669		
Majority		407		
Labour hold		Swing		

=== Devizes South and Bromham ===
Devizes South and Bromham
Party	Candidate	Votes	%	±%
Conservative	Patricia Rugg	2,576		
Labour	Angus Raymond Taylor	1,570		
Liberal Democrats	Lionel Harry Grundy	1,426		
Majority		1,006		
Conservative hold		Swing		

=== Downton ===
Downton
Party	Candidate	Votes	%	±%
Conservative	Julian Paul Johnson	2,922		
Liberal Democrats	Robert William Steel	1,174		
Labour	Ann Oliver	646		
Green	Adam Christopher Gent	419		
Majority				
Conservative hold		Swing		

=== Durrington ===
Durrington
Party	Candidate	Votes	%	±%
Conservative	Mark Lawrence Baker	1,540		
Liberal Democrats	Judith Mary Greville	1,494		
Labour	Tamsen Angela Jacobs	663		
Majority		46		
Conservative hold		Swing		

=== Holt ===
Holt
Party	Candidate	Votes	%	±%
Liberal Democrats	Terrence Peter (Terry) Chivers	2,396		
Conservative	Christopher March	2,038		
Labour	Gregory Coombes	724		
Green	Sonja Nicolson	305		
Majority		358		
Liberal Democrats hold		Swing		

=== Kington ===
Kington
Party	Candidate	Votes	%	±%
Conservative	Jane Antoinette Scott	3,470		
Liberal Democrats	Andrew Charles Gerard Noblet	2,122		
Labour	Susan Marian Ford	851		
Majority		1,348		
Conservative hold		Swing		

=== Lavington ===
Lavington
Party	Candidate	Votes	%	±%
Conservative	Dennis James Willmott	2,492		
Liberal Democrats	James Richard Grenville Spencer	1,242		
Labour	William Mark Barnett	1,123		
Majority		1,250		
Conservative hold		Swing		

=== Malmesbury ===
Malmesbury
Party	Candidate	Votes	%	±%
Conservative	John Percy Simon Stuart Thomson	2,347		
Liberal Democrats	Lesley Clare Stockman Bennett	2,192		
Labour	Daphne Joy Jones	737		
Majority		155		
Conservative gain from Liberal Democrats		Swing		

=== Marlborough ===
Marlborough
Party	Candidate	Votes	%	±%
Liberal Democrats	Margaret Boulton	1,632		
Conservative	Leonard Henry Bulley	1,584		
Labour	Brian Andrew Lawrence McClintock	656		
Majority		48		
Liberal Democrats hold		Swing		

=== Melksham ===
Melksham
Party	Candidate	Votes	%	±%
Liberal Democrats	Angela Betty Barker	1,177		
Labour	Margaret White	949		
Conservative	Jackie Spiers	645		
Green	Hilary Millichamp	123		
Majority		228		
Liberal Democrats gain from Labour		Swing		

=== Melksham Without ===
Melksham Without
Party	Candidate	Votes	%	±%
Conservative	William Arthur Spiers	2,165		
Liberal Democrats	Nicholas Westbrook	1,774		
Labour	Geoffrey Mitcham	1,669		
Green	Laura Pictor	220		
Majority		391		
Conservative gain from Liberal Democrats		Swing		

=== Mere ===
Mere
Party	Candidate	Votes	%	±%
Conservative	Colin Read	2,156		
Liberal Democrats	Mark Houghton-Brown	1,136		
Labour	Michael Foote	571		
Majority		1,020		
Conservative hold		Swing		

=== Minety ===
Minety
Party	Candidate	Votes	%	±%
Conservative	Carole Alethea Soden	3,378		
Liberal Democrats	Ann Lorraine Davis	1,641		
Labour	Brian John Bayton	447		
Majority		1,737		
Conservative hold		Swing		

=== Pickwick with Box ===
Pickwick with Box
Party	Candidate	Votes	%	±%
Conservative	Judith Helen Seager	1,770		
Liberal Democrats	David Keith Poole	1,534		
Labour	Christopher John Lynch	1,034		
Majority		236		
Conservative hold		Swing		

=== Salisbury Bemerton ===
Salisbury Bemerton
Party	Candidate	Votes	%	±%
Labour	David John McCarthy	1,483		
Conservative	Frances Mary Patricia Howard	927		
Liberal Democrats	Colin Harry Duller	686		
Majority		556		
Labour hold		Swing		

=== Salisbury Harnham ===
Salisbury Harnham
Party	Candidate	Votes	%	±%
Conservative	William Anthony Beotric Snow	1,774		
Liberal Democrats	Brian Edward Dalton	1,417		
Labour	Rosalynne Weston	496		
Green	Sarah Margaret Green	157		
Majority		357		
Conservative hold		Swing		

=== Salisbury St Mark ===
Salisbury St Mark
Party	Candidate	Votes	%	±%
Conservative	Peter Frederick Chalke	2,111		
Liberal Democrats	Susan Margaret Thorpe	968		
Labour	Clive Robert Vincent	647		
Green	Albert John Hansford	193		
Majority		1,143		
Conservative hold		Swing		

=== Salisbury St Martin ===
Salisbury St Martin
Party	Candidate	Votes	%	±%
Liberal Democrats	Paul William Leslie Sample	2,386		
Conservative	Timothy John Stroud	1,237		
Labour	Simon John Howarth	572		
Green	Susan Isabel Wright	182		
Majority		1,149		
Liberal Democrats hold		Swing		

=== Salisbury St Paul ===
Salisbury St Paul
Party	Candidate	Votes	%	±%
Labour	Beryl Mary Jay	1,919		
Conservative	Terence John Lindley	967		
Liberal Democrats	John Patrick Abbott	700		
Green	Mark Pafford	136		
Majority		952		
Labour hold		Swing		

=== Southwick ===
Southwick
Party	Candidate	Votes	%	±%
Conservative	Bill Braid	1,043		
Independent	Tony Phillips	1,001		
Labour	Peter Ezra	620		
Independent	John Irving	562		
Green	Kevan James Cocoran	367		
Majority		42		
Conservative gain from Liberal Democrats		Swing		

=== Tisbury ===
Tisbury
Party	Candidate	Votes	%	±%
Conservative	Richard Martin Willan	2,440		
Liberal Democrats	Elizabeth Amanda Chettleburgh	1,298		
Labour	Paul Whiteside	589		
Majority		1,142		
Conservative hold		Swing		

=== Trowbridge East ===
Trowbridge East
Party	Candidate	Votes	%	±%
Conservative	Anthony Ivan Moore	1,440		
Liberal Democrats	Tom Raymond James	1,378		
Labour	Angela Womersley	1,044		
Green	Bob Gledhill	401		
Majority		62		
Conservative gain from Liberal Democrats		Swing		

=== Trowbridge South ===
Trowbridge South
Party	Candidate	Votes	%	±%
Liberal Democrats	Grace Hill	2,798		
Conservative	Andrew Powell	1,260		
Green	Nigel Pratt	532		
Majority		1,538		
Liberal Democrats hold		Swing		

=== Trowbridge West ===
Trowbridge West
Party	Candidate	Votes	%	±%
Liberal Democrats	Jeffrey Bryan Osborn	1,651		
Conservative	Aubrey Harold Thomas Austin	856		
Green	David Entwistle	340		
Majority		795		
Liberal Democrats hold		Swing		

=== Upper Wylye Valley ===
Upper Wylye Valley
Party	Candidate	Votes	%	±%
Conservative	Mary Fleur de Rhé-Philipe	2,231		
Liberal Democrats	Richard John Crofts	1,057		
Green	Kathryn Toyne	313		
Majority		1,174		
Conservative hold		Swing		

=== Warminster East ===
Warminster East
Party	Candidate	Votes	%	±%
Conservative	Dorothea Joan Main	1,699		
Liberal Democrats	Giacinto Giovanni (John) Barberio	1,196		
Green	Jonathan William Daniels	268		
Majority		503		
Conservative hold		Swing		

=== Warminster West ===
Warminster West
Party	Candidate	Votes	%	±%
Independent	John Syme	1,639		
Conservative	Martin Baker	1,307		
Liberal Democrats	Edward Raymond Beaty	1,013		
Green	David John Howell	217		
Majority		332		
Independent gain from Liberal Democrats		Swing		

=== Westbury ===
Westbury
Party	Candidate	Votes	%	±%
Independent	Christopher Newbury	1,580		
Conservative	John Clegg	1,306		
Liberal Democrats	Horace John Prickett	1,086		
Labour	Michael Sutton	785		
Green	James Toyne	129		
Majority		274		
Independent hold		Swing		

=== Whorwellsdown Hundred ===
Whorwellsdown Hundred
Party	Candidate	Votes	%	±%
Liberal Democrats	Trevor William Carbin	2,526		
Conservative	Joan Savage	2,202		
Green	Susan Nowell-Kelley	350		
Majority		324		Gain from 1998 by−election
Liberal Democrats gain from Conservatives (UK)		Swing		

=== Wilton and Wylye ===
Wilton and Wylye
Party	Candidate	Votes	%	±%
Liberal Democrats	Ian Clive West	2,214		
Conservative	Anthony Julian Brown-Hovelt	1,969		
Labour	Clare Miranda Moody	512		
Green	Hamish Douglas Soutar	157		
Independent	Timothy Ingle Abbott	146		
Majority		245		
Liberal Democrats hold		Swing		

=== Wootton Bassett North ===
Wootton Bassett North
Party	Candidate	Votes	%	±%
Conservative	Mollie Eileen May Groom	1,692		
Liberal Democrats	Jennifer Anne Stratton	1,214		
Labour	Valerie Irene Price	573		
Majority		478		
Conservative hold		Swing		

=== Wootton Bassett South ===
Wootton Bassett South
Party	Candidate	Votes	%	±%
Conservative	Toby Russell Sturgis	2,545		
Liberal Democrats	Daphne Joyce Matthews	1,799		
Labour	Ellis Webb	971		
Majority		746		
Conservative hold		Swing		

== By-elections between 2001 and 2005 ==
=== Salisbury St Paul ===
Salisbury St Paul By-Election 14 November 2002
Party	Candidate	Votes	%	±%
Labour	Clive Robert Vincent	534	36.8	−14.8
Conservative	Terence John Lindley	288	19.8	−6.2
Liberal Democrats	Ben Gerald Rawlence	272	18.7	−0.1
Independent	Stephen Michael Dauwalder	252	17.4	+17.4
UKIP	Derek William Sales	56	3.8	+3.8
Green	Susan Isabel Wright	50	3.4	−0.3
Majority		246	17.0	
Turnout		1,482	24.3	
Labour hold		Swing		

=== Chippenham Sheldon ===
Chippenham Sheldon By-Election 26 February 2004
Party	Candidate	Votes	%	±%
Liberal Democrats	Paul Jonathan Fox	1,052	57.0	+17.5
Conservative	Adrian Robin Nicholas Fry	488	26.4	−2.7
Labour	Maureen Frances Lloyd	307	16.6	−14.8
Majority		564	30.6	
Turnout		1,847	29.5	
Liberal Democrats hold		Swing		
