= Jane Scott, Baroness Scott of Bybrook =

English Conservative politician

The Right Honourable The Baroness Scott of Bybrook OBE
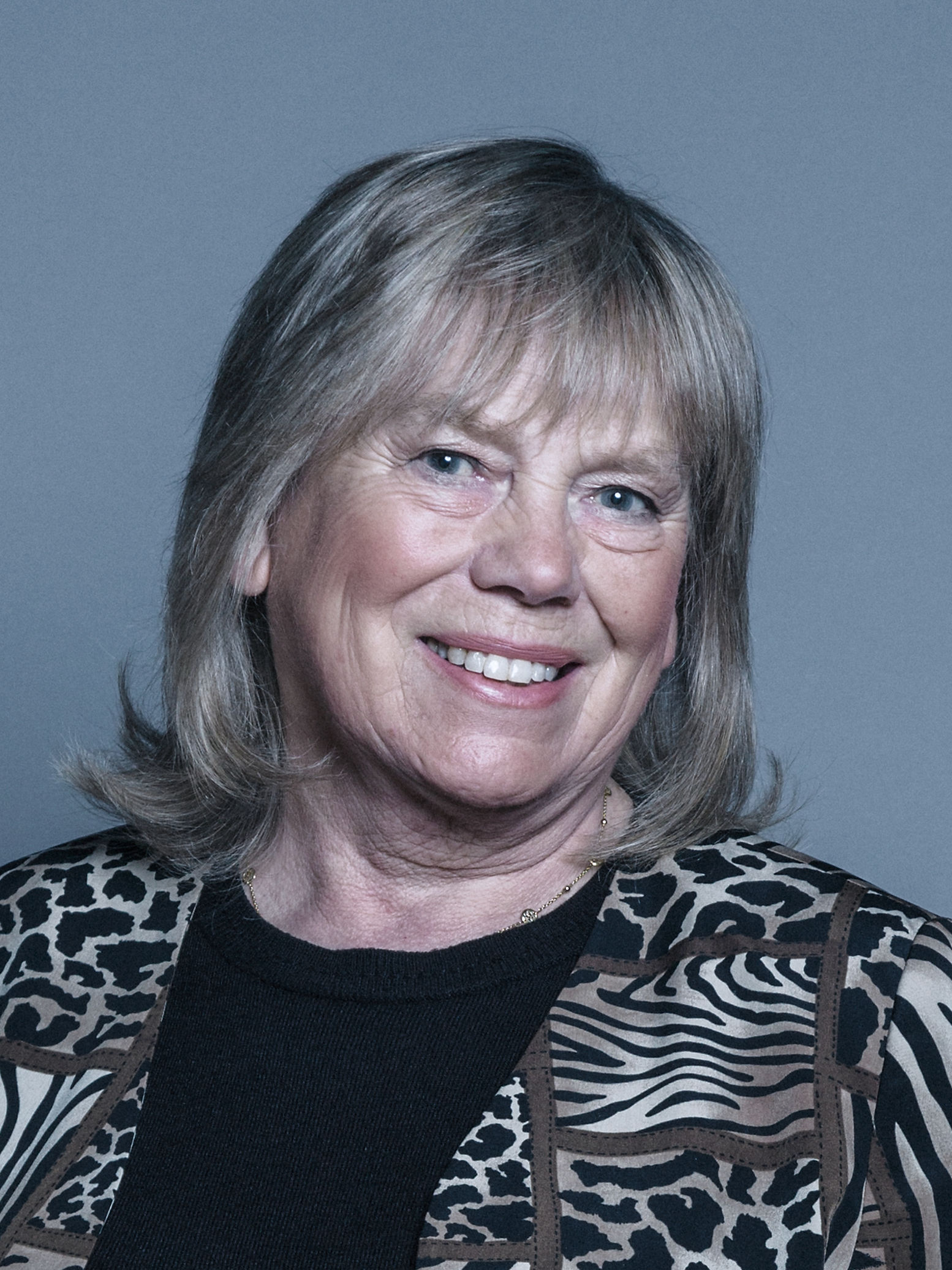
- Official portrait, 2018

Parliamentary Under-Secretary of State for Social Housing and Faith
- In office 20 September 2022 – 5 July 2024
- Prime Minister: Liz Truss; Rishi Sunak
- Succeeded by: The Baron Khan of Burnley

Baroness-in-Waiting Government Whip
- In office 14 February 2020 – 20 September 2022
- Prime Minister: Boris Johnson
- Preceded by: The Baroness Sater

Leader of the Wiltshire Council
- In office 1 April 2009 – 10 July 2019
- Preceded by: Council established
- Succeeded by: Philip Whitehead

Leader of the Wiltshire County Council
- In office 15 July 2003 – 1 April 2009
- Preceded by: Peter Chalke
- Succeeded by: Council abolished

Member of the House of Lords
- Lord Temporal
- Life peerage 8 October 2015

Wiltshire Councillor for Bybrook
- In office 4 June 2009 – 14 February 2020
- Preceded by: Council established
- Succeeded by: Nick Botterill

Wiltshire County Councillor for Kington
- In office 1 May 1997 – 1 April 2009
- Preceded by: Doreen Darby
- Succeeded by: Council merged into Wiltshire Council

Personal details
- Born: 13 June 1947 (age 79)
- Party: Conservative

Jane Antoinette Scott, Baroness Scott of Bybrook, OBE (born 13 June 1947) is a British Conservative politician who served as Parliamentary Under-Secretary of State for Social Housing and Faith from September 2022 to July 2024. She is a member of the House of Lords, was a Government whip from 2020 to 2022, and is currently a Shadow Minister for Housing, Communities and Local Government. She was leader of Wiltshire County Council between 2003 and 2009 and then of its successor the Wiltshire Council unitary authority from June 2009 until July 2019, when she stood down, also retiring as a councillor in February 2020.

== Early life ==
Born on 13 June 1947, Scott was educated at the Convent of Jesus and Mary High School in Harlesden, Brent, London, and then took a diploma in dairying at the Lancashire College of Agriculture, later renamed as Myerscough College.

== Career ==
After college, Scott worked in the dairy industry, on farms and also in public relations work, marketing and lecturing. She moved to Wiltshire in the 1990s and in 1995 was elected to North Wiltshire District Council. Two years later, she was elected to Wiltshire County Council, and in 2001 became chairman of its Education Committee, then cabinet member for children, education and libraries, and finally Leader in 2003. In the county council, she represented the Kington division, and in the district council Kington St Michael.

When chosen to lead Wiltshire County Council in 2003, Scott said: "Being elected leader of the council is a great honour and I intend to devote all of my time and energies to my new responsibilities." For some years, she was a member of the Local Government Association's General Assembly and for a time her name was on the Conservative Party 'A' List of parliamentary candidates. As leader of the county council, from 2007 she successfully argued for a unitary authority for Wiltshire, which would mean the demise of the county's four existing District Councils, facing determined opposition from leading Conservatives, including Eric Pickles and Michael Ancram.

In 2009, in the first elections to a new Wiltshire Council, the unitary authority created by merging the county and its districts, she was elected for a new division called "By Brook". This includes the parishes of Biddestone (with Slaughterford), Castle Combe, Hullavington, Grittleton, Nettleton, North Wraxall, and Yatton Keynell. The Conservatives won 62 of the 98 seats available, and a few days later Scott was elected as the first Leader of the new unitary authority.

Scott was appointed OBE in the 2010 New Year Honours for services to local government. On 27 August 2015 it was announced that on the nomination of David Cameron she was to be created a life peer, giving her a seat in the House of Lords. She was created Baroness Scott of Bybrook, of Upper Wraxall in the County of Wiltshire, on the afternoon of 8 October. The title refers to the Bybrook River, after which Scott's electoral division of Wiltshire was named.

She was a member of the National Youth Agency and the Wiltshire and Swindon Learning Skills Council. chair of the Wiltshire Strategic Board, and a Local Education Authority Inspector for Ofsted.

In May 2019, Scott announced that she was standing down as Leader of Wiltshire Council with effect from July, and on 10 July 2019, Phillip Whitehead took over from her. She resigned as a councillor in February 2020, and in March Nick Botterill, a former Leader of the London Borough of Hammersmith and Fulham was selected as the new Conservative candidate for By Brook. He was elected at the 2021 elections.

Baroness Scott of Bybrook piloted many key government Bills in the 2022-23 Session of Parliament, including the Levelling-up and Regeneration Act 2023, and the Social Housing (Regulation) Act 2023, and was the Government spokesperson on a number of successful Private Members' Bills in that Session.

== Private life ==
In 1986 Scott married Ronald J. Scott, an executive of the International Monetary Fund. They had three children, and until 2013 lived near Chippenham on a livestock farm. After a severe fall from a horse in the 1980s, she took up breeding Caspian horses, and in 1999 her occupation was "horse stud owner". She and her daughter Fleur, a vet, have been active members of the Caspian Breed Society.

== See also ==
Wiltshire Council's banner

- 1997 Wiltshire County Council election
- 2001 Wiltshire County Council election
- 2005 Wiltshire County Council election
- 2009 Wiltshire Council election
- 2013 Wiltshire Council election
- 2017 Wiltshire Council election

== Notes ==
Civic offices
Preceded by New council	Leader of Wiltshire Council; June 2009 – July 2019	Succeeded by Philip Whitehead
Preceded by Peter Chalke	Leader of Wiltshire County Council; 2003 – June 2009	Succeeded by Council defunct
