= Robert Baddeley (British Army officer) =

British soldier and former Aide-de-camp to Queen Elizabeth II

Robert John Baddeley DL (born 1934) is a British soldier and former Aide-de-camp to Queen Elizabeth II. In the British Army he was a regular officer, rising to the rank of Brigadier.

For twelve years he was a Conservative politician and was Chairman of Wiltshire County Council for the year 1999–2000, after which he was appointed as a deputy lieutenant for Wiltshire.

== Military career ==
From Sandhurst, Baddeley was commissioned as a second lieutenant into the 4th/7th Royal Dragoon Guards in 1954.

From November 1983 to January 1986 he was Chief Instructor at the Defence Services Command and Staff College of Bangladesh. He was then appointed as aide-de-camp to Queen Elizabeth II and as Director of Army Training and Inspector of Physical & Adventurous Training.

He retired as aide-de-camp to the Queen in 1989, when he was replaced by Brigadier Arthur Gooch.

In 1989 he succeeded General Sir Robert Ford as Colonel of the 4th/7th Royal Dragoon Guards, and relinquished the appointment in 1992.

== Political career ==
Baddeley was elected to Wiltshire County Council as a Conservative in 1988. In 1999, he became chairman of Wiltshire County Council.

== Honours ==
In November 2000, Baddeley was appointed a Deputy Lieutenant for Wiltshire.

He is also an Honorary Freeman of the Livery of the Worshipful Company of Coachmakers and Coach Harness Makers of the City of London.

== Recreations ==
Baddeley is a supporter of the Kipling Society.

== See also ==
Wiltshire County Council's banner

- 1989 Wiltshire County Council election
- 1993 Wiltshire County Council election
- 1997 Wiltshire County Council election
