= Jack Ainslie =

British politician

John Bernard Ainslie OBE (2 August 1921 – 5 January 2007), known as Jack Ainslie, was a Wiltshire farmer and Liberal politician, Chairman of Wiltshire County Council from 1986 to 1990.

== Early life ==
Born at Stanmore, Middlesex, on 2 August 1921, the son of Charles Bernard Ainslie MC (1879–1937) and his wife Eileen Holloway, Ainslie was baptized into the Church of England at St Matthew's, Bayswater, on Christmas Eve of that year.

The young Ainslie was educated at Harrow and Trinity College, Oxford, where he matriculated in 1947. His arrival at Oxford was delayed by his service in the British Army during the Second World War, and he was commissioned into the Royal Berkshire Regiment as a second lieutenant on 9 July 1942.

His paternal grandfather was William George Ainslie, who at the time of his father's birth was an Iron Master and was later member of parliament (Conservative) for North Lonsdale in Lancashire, from 1885 to 1892. He was one of the five children of Montague Ainslie, JP (1792–1884), of Bengal in India and of Grizedale, Lancashire.

Charles Bernard Ainslie was also the father of Constance Mangskau (1907–1990), who had a Thai mother, Kunkaew, and became a nurse.

== Career ==
Ainslie was an arable, dairy and sheep farmer at Home Farm, Mildenhall, Wiltshire. In politics, he said he was a socialist when he left school, and commented in 1985 "I voted Labour in 1945 and got disillusioned with the party by the end of the 1940s". In the 1950s, he became a radical Liberal of the age inspired by Jo Grimond, and he was passionate about European unity, state education, and world development.

In 1962, with the support of others, Ainslie re-formed the moribund Devizes Constituency Liberal Association and established the Thrifty Orange in Marlborough, an early charity shop, to raise funds for it.

In 1964 he was first elected to Wiltshire County Council, and he continued to represent his rural area at that level for nearly thirty years, until 1993. Although during those years the county was predominantly Conservative, while Ainslie was an outspoken Liberal, he served as chairman of the county's Education Committee from 1973 until 1977.

He stood unsuccessfully for Parliament in Devizes at the 1974 and 1979 general elections, and when in 1982 the SDP-Liberal Alliance agreed a division of constituencies between its two parties, it was a blow to him that he had to surrender Devizes to the SDP. Ainslie was a member of the local Alliance negotiating committee for Gloucestershire and Wiltshire, and he gave up his own position in Devizes to allow a younger Liberal to contest Stroud. However, he remained a strong supporter of the Alliance and later of the merged party, the Liberal Democrats.

In 1979, he contested the first direct elections to the European Parliament as a Liberal and in 1984 fought a strong SDP-Liberal Alliance campaign for the Wiltshire Euro-constituency, gaining over 60,000 votes. This campaign may have helped the Alliance to succeed at the Wiltshire County Council elections of 1985, when its members found themselves forming the largest political group and Ainslie became Chairman of the County Council, a post he held until 1989. During the same period, he was simultaneously chairman of the county council's Policy (later Policy and Resources) Committee, which made him the de facto Leader of the council as well.

In 1990, Ainslie became the chairman of 'Action for the River Kennet' (ARK), a group he helped found which campaigned against pollution and excessive water abstraction.

After he died at Mildenhall on 5 January 2007 aged 85, Sara Morrison, a former vice-chairman of the Conservative Party, said that it was "the end of an era... when we took our public duties and responsibilities very seriously", and the Labour peer Lord Faulkner of Worcester described him as "...a representative of the old school of parliamentary candidates in country areas; urbane, intelligent, knowledgeable on rural matters, a gentleman". Roger de Vere, Ainslie's successor as chairman of ARK, said "He was a great leader and a great man."

In June 2007, former Liberal Democrat party leader Charles Kennedy MP proposed the establishment of an annual countryside lecture as part of Ainslie's legacy.

== Family ==
On 21 April 1951, Ainslie married Shelagh Lilian Forbes, and they had one son and three daughters. Their son Andrew Ainslie took over the family farm.

== Honours ==
- 1983 New Year Honours, Officer of the Order of the British Empire

== See also ==
- List of chairmen of Wiltshire County Council
- 1973 Wiltshire County Council election
- 1989 Wiltshire County Council election
