= Peter Chalke =

Businessman and Conservative politician in England

Peter Frederick Chalke CBE (born 1944) is a business man and Conservative politician in England.

Chalke was twice Leader of Wiltshire County Council, standing down the second time in 2003 to become national leader of the Conservatives in the Local Government Association, and was also a member of the Standards Board for England.

== Career ==
Born in Salisbury, Wiltshire, in 1944, Chalke was educated at Chafyn Grove School and joined the family business, W. M. Chalke and Sons, of South Newton, timber merchants, of which he became head. He was first elected to Wiltshire County Council in 1982. In 1986 he became leader of the Conservative group and went on to lead the county council. When his party lost control, Chalke remained as leader of the Wiltshire Conservative group, and again became Leader of the county council in 1998, when taking back control the year after the election of the first Blair government. In the Local Government Association of England and Wales (LGA) he was elected as deputy leader of the Conservative Group and was his party's spokesman on education.

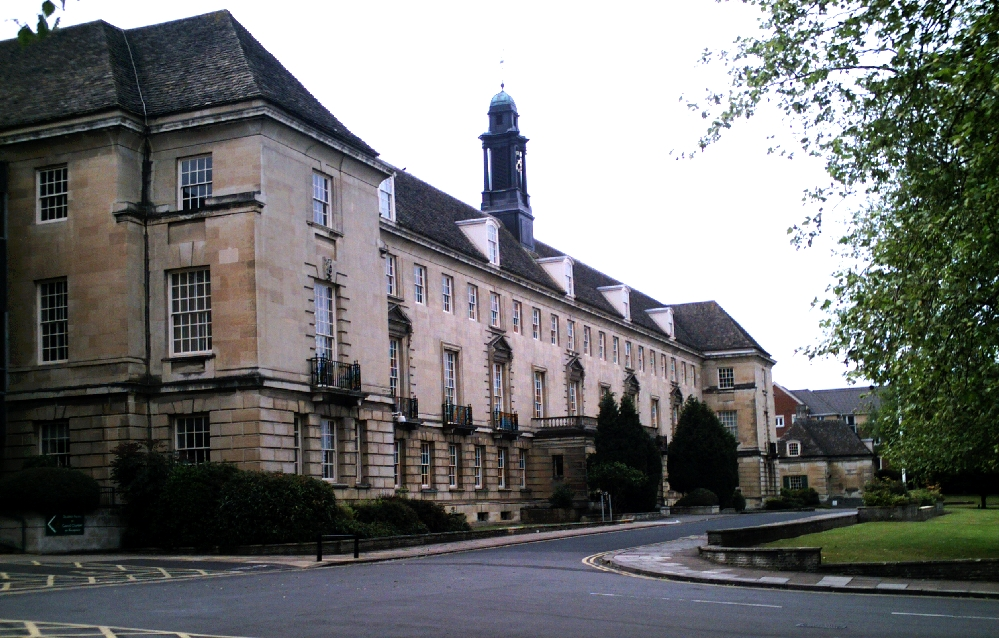
County Hall, Trowbridge

In April 1999, as Leader of Wiltshire County Council, Chalke was quoted in The Times on the need to do something to help refugees from the war in Kosovo. He suggested that army bases in Wiltshire at Rollestone, Knook, and Westdown near Shrewton, could be made available and commented "We have a responsibility to do something to help and will be looking at whatever other accommodation there is available."

In 2002, Chalke chaired a Conservative Party working group which drew up a plan for the next Conservative government to free schools from the control of failing councils, and this received the full support of the Shadow Cabinet of Iain Duncan Smith. In publishing its policy proposals in January 2003, Chalke commented: "Those authorities, riven by mismanagement, that are clearly failing their schools and pupils will be stripped of their powers, allowing schools to break free from the straitjacket of a failing authority.".

In July 2003, Chalke was appointed to lead the LGA Conservative Group and was elected as Deputy Chairman of the LGA, so announced his resignation as Leader of the County Council. He then lived in London for two years.

On standing down, Chalke commented that the high point of his time in office in Wiltshire had been the recent success of a campaign for the Government to give Wiltshire area cost adjustment status, as a result of which it had gained millions of pounds a year in higher Government grants. His greatest disappointment was that the new Wiltshire and Swindon History Centre would not be based in Devizes.

In Wiltshire, Chalke was succeeded by Jane Scott. She commented some years later that her style of leadership was quite different to the "very traditional and old-fashioned way" that Chalke had run the county.

Chalke was also a board member of the Standards Board for England, retiring in 2006, and Honorary Secretary of the British Wood Turners Association for many years. He continues in business as a director of Brooklet Developments and ACC Properties Ltd.

== Personal life ==
In 1966, Chalke married Anne Rhind-Tutt, a member of a long-established Wiltshire family. They had two children and four grandchildren and celebrated their golden wedding anniversary in 2016, when they were living in Stapleford.

== Honours ==
In the 1996 New Year Honours, Chalke was appointed a Commander of the Order of the British Empire for political and public services.
