= List of deputy lieutenants of Wiltshire =

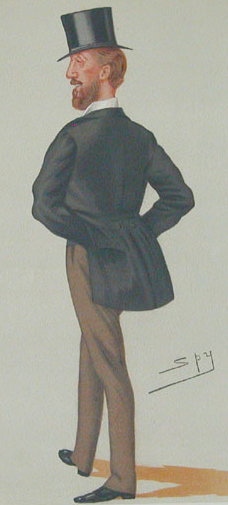
Caricature of Lord Henry Frederick Thynne by Leslie Ward, 1877

This is a list of deputy lieutenants of Wiltshire, England.

Unlike the appointment of High Sheriff, which is for one year, the term of office of a Deputy Lieutenant normally lasts until they reach the age of 75.

The Wiltshire Lieutenancy has an establishment of up to 36 deputy lieutenants. They are chosen to reflect a wide range of interests and backgrounds, and can be appointed at any age but tend to be aged over 60; they are normally expected to serve for at least five years before they must retire on reaching the age of 75. Deputy lieutenants can be appointed for a set period of time, but this approach has never been adopted in Wiltshire.

New deputy lieutenants are nominated by the Lord Lieutenant and follow a formal process to confirm their appointment. The Lord-Lieutenant is not obliged to appoint a new Deputy Lieutenant immediately after a current Deputy Lieutenant retires and thus may hold several vacancies.

Retired deputy lieutenants can continue to use the post-nominal letters 'DL' after the date of their retirement.

== 16th-century appointments ==
- Sir Henry Knyvet of Charlton (died 1598)
- Sir Matthew Arundell of Wardour Castle (1589–1598)

== 17th-century appointments ==
- Sir Walter Long (c. 1565 – 1610)
- Sir Walter Vaughan (c. 1572 – 1639) of Bishopstone, Salisbury, in office by 1611 and until at least 1633
- Anthony Hungerford of Black Bourton (1567–1627), in office c.1610–1624
- Sir Edward Hungerford (1596–1648), in office 1624–1643
- Thomas Penruddocke (c.1648–1695), commissioned 1683
- Sir Gilbert Talbot (c.1606–1695), in office 1688–1689

== 18th-century appointments ==
- John Baskerville, of Turleigh, Bradford-on-Avon (died 1800)
- Edward Horlock Mortimer, of Trowbridge (died 1803)

== 19th-century appointments ==
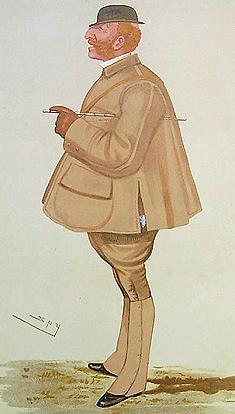
Caricature of Lord Arthur Somerset DL, 1887

- Walter Long (1793–1867)
- Robert Parry Nisbet (1793–1882)
- William Heald Ludlow Bruges (1796–1855)
- Sir Alexander Malet, 2nd Baronet (1800–1886)
- George Brudenell-Bruce, 2nd Marquess of Ailesbury (1804–1878)
- Lord Henry Frederick Thynne (1832–1904)
- Sir F. S. Astley
- A. Awdry
- Sir John Wither Awdry (1795–1878)
- Lord Bruce (1804–1878)
- E. L. Clutterbuck
- Sir William Roger Brown (1831–1902), commissioned 1898
- Camille Caillard of Wingfield House (1822–1898), commissioned 1878

== 20th-century appointments ==
- Lord Henry Arthur George Somerset (1851–1926)
- Walter Hume Long, 1st Viscount Long (1854–1924)
- Vincent Caillard of Wingfield House (1856–1930), commissioned 1920
- Brigadier-General John Hartman Morgan (1876–1955)
- Richard Long, 3rd Viscount Long (1892–1967), commissioned 1946
- George Petty-Fitzmaurice, 8th Marquess of Lansdowne (1912–1997); resigned 19 February 1973

== 1968 appointments ==
- Alfred Edward Batt, 251 Castle Road, Salisbury
- Wing Commander Sir Henry Algernon Langton, Overtown House, Wroughton (1914–1997)
- Arthur Guy Stratton, Alton Priors, Marlborough
- Arthur Frank Seton Sykes, Stockton, Warminster (1903–1980)
- Group Captain Frank Andrew Willan, Bridges, Teffont, Salisbury (1915–1981)
- Brigadier George Wort, The Old Rectory, Hilcot, Pewsey

== 1974 appointments ==
- Nigel James Moffatt Anderson (1920–2008)

== 1978 appointments ==
- Sir Maurice Henry Dorman, The Old Manor, Overton, Marlborough (1912–1993)
- Dr Timothy Kindersley Maurice, 10 Kingsbury Street, Marlborough
- Lieutenant-Colonel John Godfrey Jeans, Chalke Pyt House, Broadchalke, Salisbury
- Lieutenant (Honorary Captain) Richard Flower Stratton, Kingston Deverill, Warminster
- Rear-Admiral Harry Desmond Nixon, Ashley Cottage, Ashley, Box, Corsham
- Lieutenant-Colonel Charles Hugh Antrobus, Wootton House, Wootton Rivers, Marlborough

== 1979 appointments ==
- Daniel Edmund Awdry (1924–2008)

== 1983 appointments ==
- Reginald John Richard Arundell
- John Morrison, 1st Baron Margadale (1906–1996)
- Mary Ethel Salisbury (1917–2008)
- Sir Peter Malden Studd (1916–2003)
- Major Anthony Richard Turner

== 1990 appointments ==
- Lieutenant-General Sir Robin Macdonald Carnegie, of Chilmark
- Captain Beresford Norman Gibbs, of Oaksey, late Royal Horse Guards
- Lieutenant-General Sir Maurice Robert Johnston, of Worton (born 1929)
- Charles Petty-Fitzmaurice, 9th Marquess of Lansdowne (born 1941)
- Major David Alwyne Carne Rasch, of Middle Woodford

== 1992 appointments ==
- Anthony Tryon, 3rd Baron Tryon, of Ogbury House, Great Durnford

== 1993 appointments ==
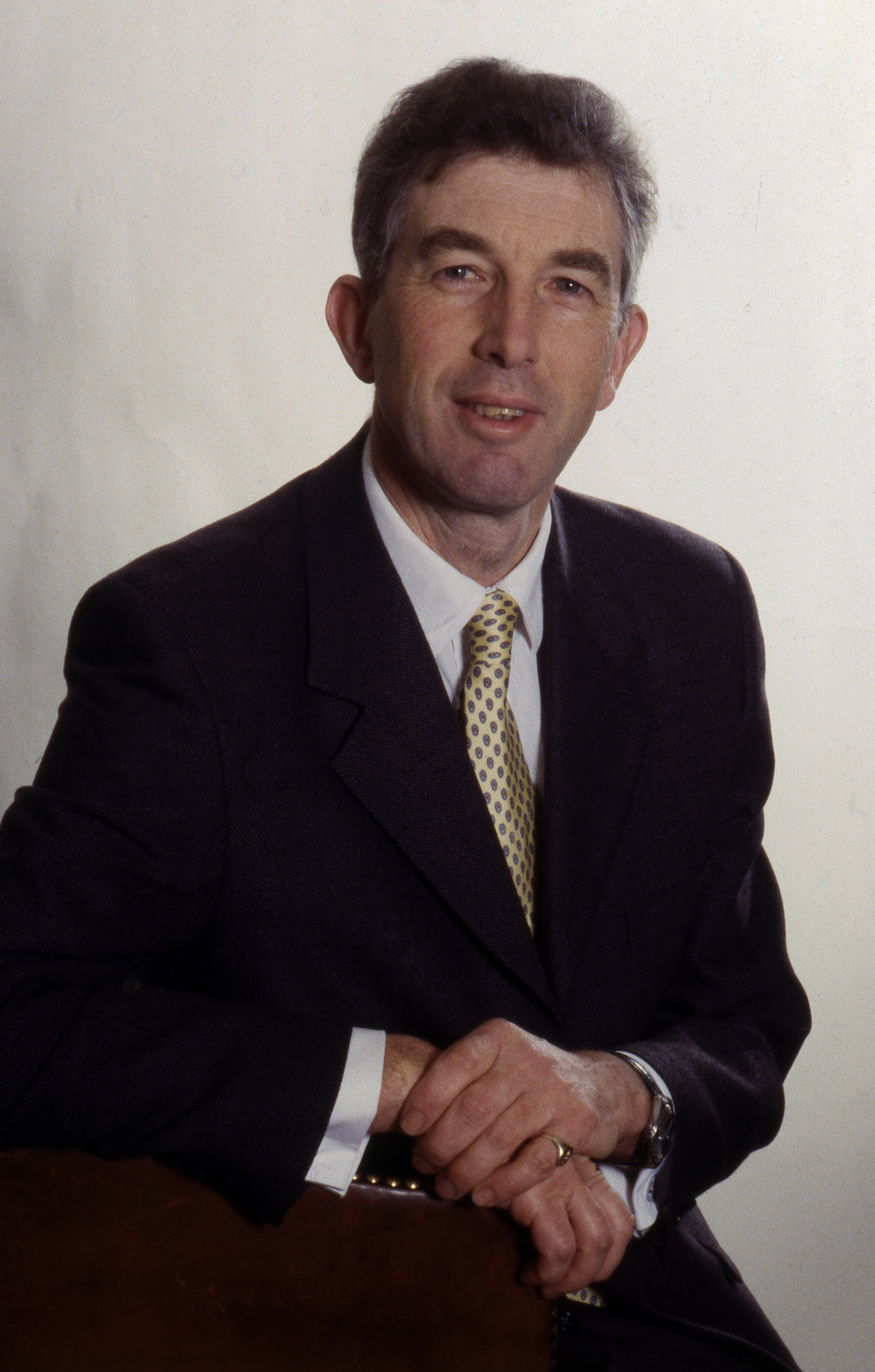
The 19th Duke of Somerset

- John Seymour, 19th Duke of Somerset, of Bradley House, Maiden Bradley

== 1996 appointments ==
- Richard David Stratton, Manor Farm, Kingston Deverill, Warminster
- General Sir John Finlay Willasey Wilsey, Shaftesbury

== 1997 appointments ==
- Lady Margaret Josephine Benson, Pauls Dene House, Salisbury
- Major-General Patrick Guy Brooking, Downlands House, Stonehenge Road, Amesbury
- David John Randolph, West Foscote Farm, Grittleton, Chippenham
- Eric Walker, 2 Penfold Gardens, Old Town, Swindon

== 1998 appointments ==
- John Barnard Bush (born 1937), Fullingbridge Farm, Heywood, Westbury
- Charles Giles Clarke, Holt Manor, Holt
- Anna Ruth Grange, Thornhill Farm, Malmesbury
- Patrick John Wintour, Weavers House, Bromham, Chippenham

== 1999 appointments ==
- Brigadier Arthur Gooch, Manor Farm, Chitterne
- Christine Cooke, Church Hill House, Donhead St Mary
- Susan Eliot-Cohen, Hilldrop Farm, Ramsbury
- Lady Hawley, Little Cheverell House, Little Cheverell
- Peter Manser, Chisenbury Priory, East Chisenbury

== 2000 appointments ==
- Brigadier Robert John Baddeley, Hazeldon House, Wardour, Tisbury
- Philip John Miles, Middle Farm, Stanley, Chippenham

== 2002 appointments ==
- Robert Noyes Lawton, North Farm, Aldbourne, Marlborough
- David Bedingfield Scott, Nursteed House, Devizes

== 2003 appointments ==
- Sara Jones, Orchard, Manor Farm Lane, Great Wishford, Salisbury
- Alastair John Morrison, 3rd Baron Margadale of Islay, The Quadrangle, Tisbury, Salisbury
- William Francis Wyldbore-Smith, Bremhill Manor, Calne

== 2004 appointments ==
- Lieutenant-General Sir Roderick Alexander Cordy-Simpson, The Coach House, Mill Lane, Bishopstrow, Warminster
- David Kim Hempleman-Adams, Hatt House, Box
- William John Fishlock, 41 Windsor Road, Swindon

== 2006 appointments ==
- Nicky Morrison, Whisper Cottage, Compton Bassett
- June Osborne, The Deanery, The Close, Salisbury
- Tim Pap, Mallards, Chirton, Devizes
- Sarah Troughton, Lynch House, Wanborough
- Judge John McNaught, Swindon Combined Courts, Swindon

== 2007 appointments ==
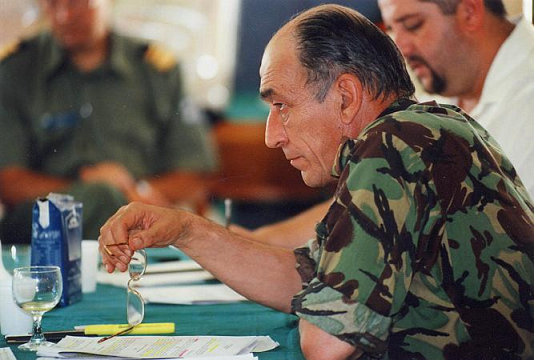
General Sir Mike Jackson

- Lord MacLaurin of Knebworth (born 1937), Rowley Grange, Farleigh Hungerford
- General Sir Michael David Jackson (1944–2024), Stocktree Cottage, Great Bedwyn
- Professor Christopher Paul Mullard

== 2009 appointments ==
- Sir Michael Edward Pitt, Garden Cottage, Foxley, Malmesbury
- Peter John Pleydell-Bouverie, Newcourt, Downton, Salisbury
- Margaret Madeline Wilks, Box Cottage, North Newnton, Pewsey

== 2011 appointments ==
- Richard Handover, Marlborough
- Christopher Hoare, Potterne
- Angus Macpherson, Police and Crime Commissioner
- Luke March, Salisbury
- Dame Elizabeth Neville, former Chief Constable of Wiltshire

== 2013 appointments ==
- Alan Fletcher, of The Avenue, Stanton Fitzwarren, Swindon
- Robert Hiscox, of Rainscombe Park, Oare, Marlborough

== 2015 appointments ==
- Helen Browning
- General Sir John Freegard Deverell

== 2016 appointments ==
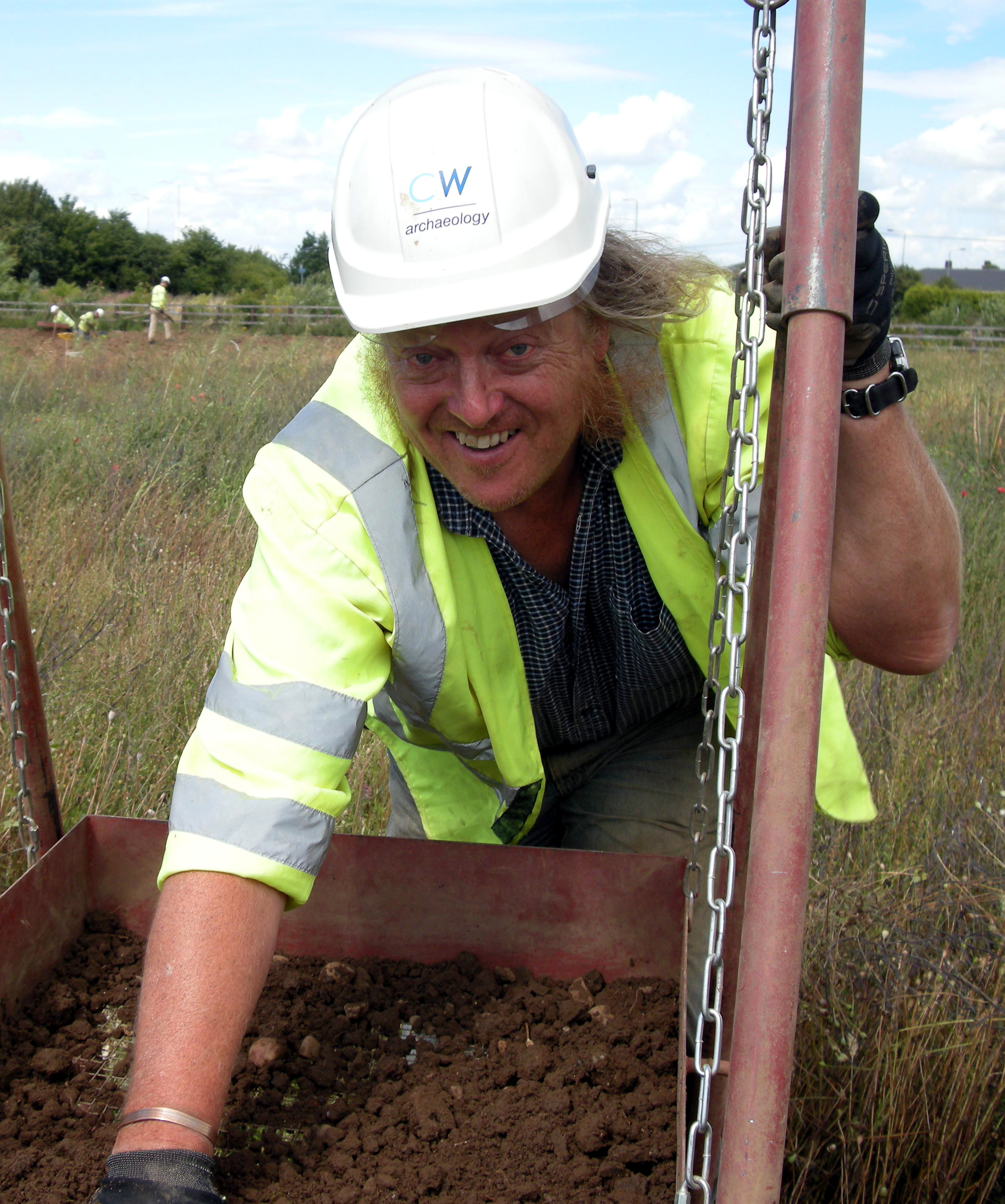
Phil Harding

- Richard John Tennant Arundell
- Helen Judith Birchenough
- Dr Philip Anthony Harding
- Dr David Peter Hemery

== 2018 appointments ==
- District Judge Simon Nicholas Cooper
- Deepak Gupta
- Shirley Kathleen Ludford
- Victoria Jane Nye

== 2019 appointments ==
- Amanda Judith Burnside
- Air Vice-Marshal David Cyril Couzens
- Fiona Petty-Fitzmaurice, Marchioness of Lansdowne

== 2020 appointments ==
- Piers Dibben
- Ninna Gibson
- Lieutenant General Sir Andrew Gregory

== 2021 appointments ==
- Minette Batters, farmer
- Claire Garrett, charity CEO
- Stephanie Millward, swimmer, Paralympic gold medallist
- Sebastian Warrack

== 2024 appointments ==
- Mohammed Makram Ali
- Josephine Del Mar
- Rachel Gowshall
- Nicholas Papadopulos, Dean of Salisbury
- General Sir Nick Parker

== 2026 appointments ==
- Primrose Campbell
- Sophie de Courcy
- Paul Gentleman
- Paul Martin, television presenter
- Polly Nicholson
- Jonathan Sykes

== See also ==
- Lord Lieutenant of Wiltshire
