= 1977 Wiltshire County Council election =

1977 UK local government election

← 1973	5 May 1977	1981 →
Party	Conservative	Labour	Independent
Party	Liberal
- The County of Wiltshire within England
Party before election
Conservative
Elected Party
Conservative

Elections to Wiltshire County Council were held on Thursday, 5 May 1977. The whole council of 79 members was up for election and the result was that the Conservatives took overall control, winning 57 seats, a gain of 17. They had previously had to rely on Independents. Labour ended with 14 county councillors, the Liberals and Independents four each.

The Chairman of the Council since 1973, Frank Willan, was re-elected and continued in office until 1979, when he was succeeded by Nigel Anderson.

== Election result ==
Result of Wiltshire County Council election, 1977
Party	Seats	Gains	Losses	Net gain/loss	Seats %	Votes %	Votes	+/−
Conservative	57	17	0	+17	72.2			
Labour	14	0	7	-7	17.7			
Liberal	4	0	3	-3	5.1			
Independent	4	0	7	-7	5.1			
