= Willan =

Willan is a surname. Notable people with the surname include:

- Anne Willan (born 1938), founded the Ecole de Cuisine La Varenne
- Frank Willan (1915–1981), English pilot, Royal Air Force officer and Conservative politician
- Frank Willan (rower) (1846–1931), English rower and Militia officer
- Healey Willan (1880–1968), Anglo-Canadian organist and composer
- Jason Willan, American soccer player
- John Willan (1799–1869), English amateur cricketer
- Robert Willan (1757–1812), English physician and the founder of dermatology as a medical specialty
- Robert Hugh Willan (1882–1960), British soldier
- Robert Joseph Willan (1878-1955), British surgeon and academic
- Sophie Willan (born 1987/88), British comedian

== Places ==
- Willan Saddle (Sedlovina Willan, a place in the South Shetland Islands, Antarctica
- Willan Nunatak, a mountain in the South Shetland Islands, Antarctica
- Willans (disambiguation)
- Willian (disambiguation)

== Other ==
- Willan Publishing, a book publisher (acquired by Taylor & Francis in 2010)
