= 1973 Wiltshire County Council election =

1973 UK local government election

← 1969	12 April 1973	1977 →
Party	Conservative	Labour	Independent
Party	Liberal
- The County of Wiltshire within England
Elected Party
Conservative

Elections to Wiltshire County Council were held on Thursday, 12 April 1973. The whole council of seventy-nine members was up for election, and the Conservatives came within a whisker of taking formal control.

The Chairman of the Council since 1969, Sir Henry Langton, did not stand for re-election, and at the annual meeting later in April was succeeded by Frank Willan, who continued for the whole four years of the council's term of office.

== Election result ==
The Conservatives, with thirty-nine seats, took effective control of the county council. Labour ended with twenty-two county councillors, most of them in and around Swindon, while Independents ended the election with twelve seats and the Liberals six. The elections were not fiercely fought everywhere, with twenty-four of the sixty-seven divisions uncontested. Most of the uncontested seats, eighteen, went to Conservatives, five to Independents, and one to a Liberal, Jack Ainslie.

Result of Wiltshire County Council election, 1973
Party	Seats	Gains	Losses	Net gain/loss	Seats %	Votes %	Votes	+/−
Conservative	39				49.4			
Labour	22				27.8			
Independent	12				15.2			
Liberal	6				7.6			

== Results by divisions ==
=== Amesbury No. 1 ===
Amesbury No. 1 (two seats)
Party	Candidate	Votes	%	±%
Conservative	T. H. J. Heffernan	1,675	57.7	
Conservative	A. Hall	1,622		
Labour	P. Lumley	1,228	42.3	
Labour	P. Matthews	958		
Majority		447		

=== Amesbury No. 2 ===
Amesbury No. 2
Party	Candidate	Votes	%	±%
Conservative	H. E. Richardson	832	47.4	
Labour	S. Rudkin	799	45.6	
Independent	A. Whateley	123	7.0	
Majority		33		

=== Amesbury No. 3 ===
Amesbury No. 3
Party	Candidate	Votes	%	±%
Conservative	S. Peacock	1,155		
Labour	C. Pude	571		
Majority		584		

=== Bedwyn ===
Bedwyn
Party	Candidate	Votes	%	±%
Conservative	C. E. Elliot-Cohen	Unopposed		
Majority		n/a		

=== Box ===
Box
Party	Candidate	Votes	%	±%
Conservative	R. Fudge	978	66.0	
Independent	D. Newman	503	34.0	
Majority		475	32.0	

=== Bradford ===
Bradford
Party	Candidate	Votes	%	±%
Labour	Mrs M. Mizen	1,377	43.5	
Conservative	Captain P. S. Beale	1,119	35.4	
Liberal	A. Thomas	667	21.1	
Majority		258		

=== Bradford & Melksham No. 1 ===
Bradford & Melksham No. 1
Party	Candidate	Votes	%	±%
Independent	Mrs D. L. Maulton	Unopposed		
Majority		n/a		

=== Bradford & Melksham No. 2 ===
Bradford & Melksham No. 2
Party	Candidate	Votes	%	±%
Independent	W. Earle	Unopposed		
Majority		n/a		

=== Bremhill ===
Bremhill
Party	Candidate	Votes	%	±%
Independent	Earl of Shelburne	Unopposed		
Majority		n/a		

=== Brinkworth ===
Brinkworth
Party	Candidate	Votes	%	±%
Conservative	P. Shuter	Unopposed		
Majority		n/a		

=== Calne North ===
Calne North
Party	Candidate	Votes	%	±%
Labour	L. Carpenter	817	55.9	
Liberal	E. Hornby	644	44.1	
Majority		173		

=== Calne South ===
Calne South
Party	Candidate	Votes	%	±%
Liberal	F. C. Eley	512	60.1	
Labour	M. Jeary	340	39.9	
Majority		172	20.2	

=== Cannings ===
Cannings
Party	Candidate	Votes	%	±%
Conservative	Lt Col. C. H. Antrobus	Unopposed		
Majority		n/a		

=== Chippenham Park ===
Chippenham Park
Party	Candidate	Votes	%	±%
Conservative	M. Burton	Unopposed		
Majority		n/a		

=== Chippenham Sheldon ===
Chippenham Sheldon
Party	Candidate	Votes	%	±%
Labour	H. Williamson	1,076	38.9	
Liberal	M. Whittle	921	33.3	
Conservative	G. Webb	767	27.7	
Majority		155	5.6	

=== Chippenham Town ===
Chippenham Town
Party	Candidate	Votes	%	±%
Conservative	G. B. Jamieson	711	39.5	
Liberal	S. du Plat-Taylor	708	39.4	
Labour	J. Lawless	379	21.1	
Majority		3		

=== Collingbourne ===
Collingbourne
Party	Candidate	Votes	%	±%
Conservative	W. G. Bartlett	Unopposed		
Majority		n/a		

=== Corsham ===
Corsham
Party	Candidate	Votes	%	±%
Independent	B. Fuller	1,592	59.9	
Labour	H. Shaw	1,065	49.1	
Majority		527	10.8	

=== Cricklade ===
Cricklade
Party	Candidate	Votes	%	±%
Conservative	F. Freeth	627	51.9	
Independent	C. Turner	581	48.1	
Majority		46	3.8	

=== Devizes No. 1 (East) ===
Devizes No. 1 (East)
Party	Candidate	Votes	%	±%
Liberal	F. Kirby	1,044	79.3	
Conservative	L. Coxon	273	20.7	
Majority		771	58.6	

=== Devizes No. 2 ===
Devizes No. 2
Party	Candidate	Votes	%	±%
Conservative	M. Rendall	1,025	58.4	
Labour	Mrs M. Taylor	731	41.6	
Majority		294	16.8	

=== Downton ===
Downton
Party	Candidate	Votes	%	±%
Conservative	N. J. M. Anderson	Unopposed		
Majority		n/a		

=== Enford ===
Enford
Party	Candidate	Votes	%	±%
Independent	Brigadier George Wort	992	70.0	
Labour	J. Goodall	425	30.0	
Majority		567	40.0	

=== Fisherton ===
Fisherton
Party	Candidate	Votes	%	±%
Conservative	Mrs J. E. M. Smith	990	72.8	
Labour	H. Trevor-Cox	370	27.2	
Majority		620	45.6	

=== Highworth No. 1 ===
Highworth No. 1 (three seats)
Party	Candidate	Votes	%	±%
Labour	A. Miles	3,475		
Labour	B. V. Cockbill	3,265		
Labour	K. R. Coello	3,045		
Conservative	G. Claspar	1,682		
Conservative	A. Stainer	1,606		
Conservative	R. Stainer	1,469		
Majority		1,363		

=== Highworth No. 2 ===
Highworth No. 2
Party	Candidate	Votes	%	±%
Conservative	W. McKanan-Jones	1,535	58.6	
Labour	E. Garrett	1,083	41.4	
Majority		452	17.2	

=== Highworth No. 3 ===
Highworth No. 3
Party	Candidate	Votes	%	±%
Conservative	D. G. W. Cooke	1,085	50.5	
Liberal	B. Schofield	1,062	49.5	
Majority		23	1.0	

=== Highworth No. 4 ===
Highworth No. 4
Party	Candidate	Votes	%	±%
Conservative	M. J. Bran	Unopposed		
Majority		n/a		

=== Highworth No. 5 ===
Highworth No. 5
Party	Candidate	Votes	%	±%
Conservative	R. Barnett	Unopposed		
Majority		n/a		

=== Kington ===
Kington
Party	Candidate	Votes	%	±%
Conservative	J. McCarthy	Unopposed		
Majority		n/a		

=== Langley ===
Langley
Party	Candidate	Votes	%	±%
Conservative	P. Featherston-Godley	Unopposed		
Majority		n/a		

=== Lavington ===
Lavington
Party	Candidate	Votes	%	±%
Independent	J. Spencer	935	56.1	
Independent	C. Gillington	732	43.9	
Majority		203	12.2	

=== Malmesbury ===
Malmesbury
Party	Candidate	Votes	%	±%
Conservative	Major P. Sturgis	Unopposed		
Majority		n/a		

=== Marlborough ===
Marlborough
Party	Candidate	Votes	%	±%
Independent	P. Maurice	1,291	56.9	
Conservative	A. Gray	978	43.1	
Majority		513	13.8	

=== Melksham ===
Melksham (two seats)
Party	Candidate	Votes	%	±%
Labour	F. B. Day	1,831	64.3	
Labour	Mrs M. E. Salisbury	1,798		
Independent	W. Dixon	1,016	35.7	
Majority		782		

=== Mere & Tisbury No. 1 ===
Mere & Tisbury No. 1 (Donhead & Tisbury)
Party	Candidate	Votes	%	±%
Conservative	Group Captain F. A. Willan	Unopposed		
Majority		n/a		

=== Mere & Tisbury No. 2 ===
Mere & Tisbury No. 2 (Mere)
Party	Candidate	Votes	%	±%
Independent	J. Underwood	Unopposed		
Majority		n/a		

=== New Sarum Bemerton ===
New Sarum (Bemerton)
Party	Candidate	Votes	%	±%
Labour	Mrs B. D. Brown	927	63.5	
Conservative	D. Shergold	533	36.5	
Majority		394	27.0	

=== New Sarum Fisherton ===
New Sarum (Fisherton)
Party	Candidate	Votes	%	±%
Conservative	Mrs N. M. Locock	Unopposed		
Majority		n/a		

=== New Sarum St Edmund ===
New Sarum (St Edmund)
Party	Candidate	Votes	%	±%
Conservative	R. C. A. Townsend	1,307	55.5	
Labour	R. Pelly	1,048	44.5	
Majority		259	11.0	

=== New Sarum St Mark ===
New Sarum (St Mark)
Party	Candidate	Votes	%	±%
Conservative	Mrs M. J. Benson	Unopposed		
Majority		n/a		

=== New Sarum St Paul ===
New Sarum (St Paul)
Party	Candidate	Votes	%	±%
Labour	F. W. Grandfield	808	53.4	
Conservative	W. Porter	705	46.6	
Majority		103	6.8	

=== New Sarum St Thomas ===
New Sarum (St Thomas)
Party	Candidate	Votes	%	±%
Conservative	P. Mullins	Unopposed		
Majority		n/a		

=== Pewsey ===
Pewsey
Party	Candidate	Votes	%	±%
Independent	C. Lampard	1,336	66.7	
Labour	A. Wren	667	33.3	
Majority		669	33.4	

=== Potterne ===
Potterne
Party	Candidate	Votes	%	±%
Independent	E. P. Awdry	1,142	55.9	
Conservative	A. Kidd	900	44.1	
Majority		242	11.8	

=== Preshute ===
Preshute
Party	Candidate	Votes	%	±%
Liberal	J. B. Ainslie	Unopposed		
Majority		n/a		

=== Purton ===
Purton
Party	Candidate	Votes	%	±%
Liberal	T. Rowe	958	57.6	
Conservative	W. Wilton-Fitzgerald	704	42.4	
Majority		254	15.2	

=== Sherston ===
Sherston
Party	Candidate	Votes	%	±%
Conservative	A. Turner	Unopposed		
Majority		n/a		

=== Swindon East ===
Swindon East (two seats)
Party	Candidate	Votes	%	±%
Labour	T. Griffiths	1,504		
Labour	G. Rogers	1,372		
Conservative	D. Bampton	1,290		
Conservative	A. Moss	1,145		
Majority		82		

=== Swindon Kings ===
Swindon Kings
Party	Candidate	Votes	%	±%
Conservative	Miss M. E. Matthews	581	35.2	
Labour	M. Lane	559	33.9	
Liberal	R. Scarfe	509	30.9	
Majority		22	1.3	

=== Swindon North ===
Swindon North (three seats)
Party	Candidate	Votes	%	±%
Labour	A. C. G. Durston	1,871	64.9	
Labour	M. Harbar	1,832		
Labour	F. Allen	1,750		
Conservative	F. Ashplant	687	23.8	
Communist	W. Reeves	323	11.2	
Majority		1,063		

=== Swindon Queens ===
Swindon Queens
Party	Candidate	Votes	%	±%
Liberal	Mrs B. A. Horsburgh	539	50.4	
Labour	W. Wilks	531	49.6	
Majority		8	0.8	

=== Swindon South No. 1 ===
Swindon South No. 1 (two seats)
Party	Candidate	Votes	%	±%
Conservative	Mrs F. E. Mortimer	1,886		
Conservative	G. Keiller	1,842		
Liberal	J. Newman	1,043		
Liberal	J. Richards	1,019		
Labour	P. Cunnington	570		
Labour	A. Rutson	539		
Majority		799		

=== Swindon South No. 2 ===
Swindon South No. 2 (two seats)
Party	Candidate	Votes	%	±%
Labour	L. Dowdall-Marsh	1,232	54.2	
Labour	W. Parkin	1,194		
Liberal	G. McMullen	744	32.7	
Liberal	R. Walker	654		
Conservative	W. Turpin	299	13.1	
Majority				

=== Swindon West ===
Swindon West (three seats)
Party	Candidate	Votes	%	±%
Labour	Miss E. C. M. Millin	2,394	49.4	
Labour	P. Peters	2,247		
Labour	J. Cordon	2,060		
Conservative	R. Savage	1,785	36.8	
Conservative	R. Dore	1,506		
Conservative	J. Pass	1,490		
Liberal	M. Powell	667	13.8	
Liberal	V. Horsburgh	667		
Liberal	I. Grigg	624		
Majority		275		

=== Trowbridge No. 1 ===
Trowbridge No. 1
Party	Candidate	Votes	%	±%
Conservative	B. Walden	543	35.8	
Labour	J. Hungerford	528	34.8	
Liberal	A. Thomson	447	29.4	
Majority		15	1.0	

=== Trowbridge No. 2 ===
Trowbridge No. 2
Party	Candidate	Votes	%	±%
Labour	Carmen Y. Cannell	807	51.0	
Independent	Anthony G. Phillips	774	49.0	
Majority		33	2.0	

=== Trowbridge No. 3 ===
Trowbridge No. 3
Party	Candidate	Votes	%	±%
Conservative	George Applegate	821	42.2	
Liberal	J. Stevens	648	33.3	
Labour	J. Madden	477	24.5	
Majority		173	8.9	

=== Warminster ===
Warminster (two seats)
Party	Candidate	Votes	%	±%
Conservative	J. Wall	1,530	33.5	
Independent	Mrs D. J. Main	1,298	28.5	
Liberal	E. Rees	944	20.7	
Liberal	B. Cotton	807		
Labour	P. Morrison	790	17.3	
Majority				

=== Warminster & Westbury No. 1 ===
Warminster & Westbury No. 1
Party	Candidate	Votes	%	±%
Conservative	Mrs M. L. Rosser-Rees	1,232	66.8	
Labour	J. Arkwright	611	33.2	
Majority		621	33.6	

=== Warminster & Westbury No. 2 ===
Warminster & Westbury No. 2
Party	Candidate	Votes	%	±%
Conservative	Hon. James Morrison	1,132	58.0	
Labour	W. Vivash	819	42.0	
Majority		313	16.0	

=== Warminster & Westbury No. 3 ===
Warminster & Westbury No. 3
Party	Candidate	Votes	%	±%
Independent	J. M. Stratton	Unopposed		
Majority		n/a		

=== Westbury ===
Westbury
Party	Candidate	Votes	%	±%
Labour	Brian J. Gray	1,350	70.2	
Liberal	Caroline Ball	574	29.8	
Majority		776	40.4	

=== Whiteparish ===
Whiteparish
Party	Candidate	Votes	%	±%
Conservative	Lady Nye	Unopposed		
Majority		n/a		

=== Wilton ===
Wilton
Party	Candidate	Votes	%	±%
Liberal	C. E. Cooper	1,240	54.6	
Conservative	L. Gray	711	31.3	
Independent	M. Woodward	319	14.1	
Majority		529	23.3	

=== Wootton Bassett ===
Wootton Bassett
Party	Candidate	Votes	%	±%
Conservative	H. G. Hobbs	1,174	42.9	
Liberal	B. Fitzwilliams	1,110	40.6	
Labour	J. Butcher	452	16.5	
Majority		64	2.3	

=== Wylye ===
Wylye
Party	Candidate	Votes	%	±%
Conservative	Lt Col. J. O. Jeans	Unopposed		
Majority		n/a		

== See also ==
- Wiltshire County Council elections
