= WFRS (disambiguation) =

WFRS is a Christian radio station in New York.

WFRS may also refer to:

- Warwickshire Fire and Rescue Service, a fire and rescue service in England
- Wiltshire Fire and Rescue Service, a former fire and rescue service in England
- World Federation of Rose Societies, a horticultural association
