= Fiona Petty-Fitzmaurice, Marchioness of Lansdowne =

British peeress and interior designer (born 1954)

The Most Honourable The Marchioness of Lansdowne DL
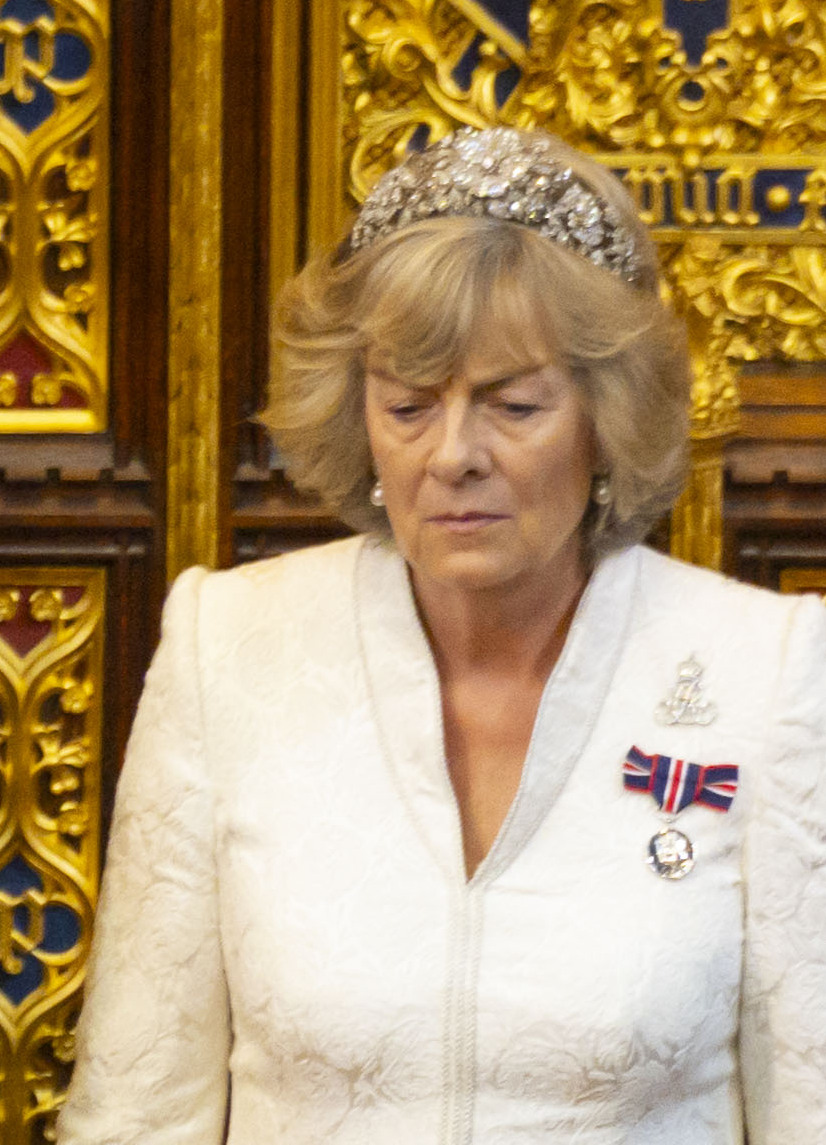
- Lady Lansdowne in the House of Lords in 2024
- Born: Fiona Mary Merritt; 3 October 1954 (age 72)
- Education: Inchbald School of Design
- Spouse: Charles Petty-Fitzmaurice, 9th Marquess of Lansdowne (m. 1987)

Fiona Mary Petty-Fitzmaurice, Marchioness of Lansdowne, DL (née Merritt; born 3 October 1954), previously known professionally as Fiona Shelburne, is a British aristocrat, socialite and interior designer. Since 2022, she has served as a queen's companion to Queen Camilla.

== Life ==
Fiona Merritt is the daughter of Donald Merritt and Patricia Phillips (b.1924, later Lady Davies). Donald and Patricia married in 1946 and divorced in 1962. Their daughter Fiona was born in Maldon, Essex in 1954, and married, as his second wife, Charles Petty-Fitzmaurice, Earl of Shelburne in an October 1987 ceremony in Bowood House. She was styled Countess of Shelburne by courtesy until her husband succeeded to his father's titles in 1999. The family seat is Bowood House, Wiltshire, and Lord and Lady Lansdowne have overseen the restoration of the house.

Lady Lansdowne trained as an interior designer at the Inchbald School of Design and worked for Colefax & Fowler. She first met her husband (then Lord Shelburne) on a working visit to Bowood while employed by Charles Hammond in the early 1980s.

A close friend of King Charles III and Queen Camilla, she is godmother of the Queen's daughter, Laura Lopes.

== Royal service ==
In 2019, Lady Lansdowne was appointed a deputy lieutenant of Wiltshire. She was High Sheriff of Wiltshire for 2022–2023.

She was appointed one of six of Camilla's queen's companions, the modern equivalent of ladies-in-waiting, in 2022. She was one of her two ladies in attendance, alongside the Queen's sister Annabel Elliot, at the coronation on 6 May 2023. She was one of two companions, alongside Lady Sarah Keswick, in attendance at the State Opening of Parliament in November 2023, and again in July 2024.

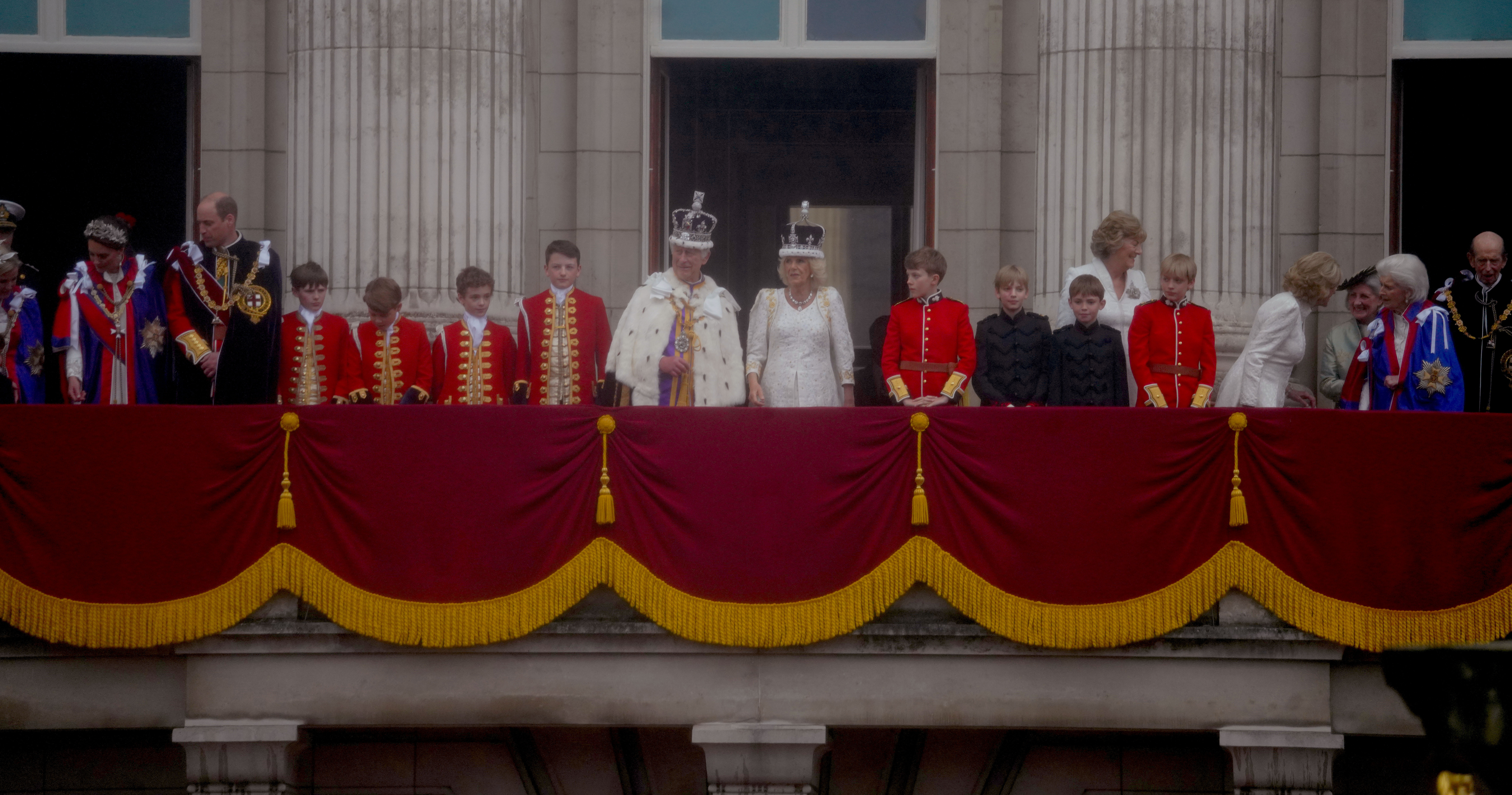
Lady Lansdowne, sixth from right, on the balcony of Buckingham Palace following the coronation of King Charles III and Queen Camilla, 6 May 2023

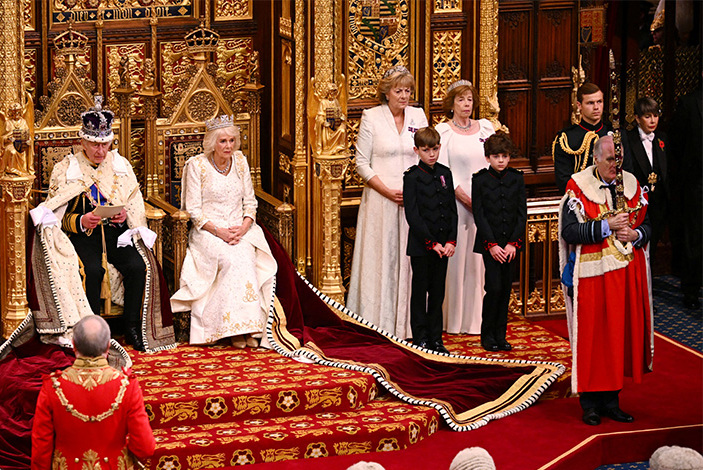
Lady Lansdowne in attendance at the State Opening of Parliament, 7 November 2023

== Honours ==
Country	Date	Appointment	Ribbon
United Kingdom	6 May 2023	King Charles III Coronation Medal	
