= Ernest Barker =

British political scientist (1874–1960)

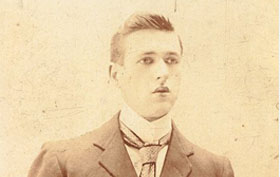
- Barker in the 1890s
- Born: 23 September 1874; Woodley, Cheshire, England
- Died: 17 February 1960 (age 85); Cambridge, Cambridgeshire, England
- Burial place: St Botolph's Church, Cambridge
- Education: Balliol College, Oxford
- Occupation: Principal of King's College London
- Spouse(s): Emily Isabel Salkeld (1900–1924); Olivia Stuart Horner (1927–1960)
- Children: 5

Sir Ernest Barker FBA (23 September 1874 – 17 February 1960) was an English political scientist who served as Principal of King's College London from 1920 to 1927.

== Life and career ==
Ernest Barker was born in Woodley, Cheshire, and educated at Manchester Grammar School and Balliol College, Oxford. Barker was a Fellow of Merton College, Oxford, from 1898 to 1905, St John's College, Oxford, from 1909 to 1913, and New College, Oxford, from 1913 to 1920. He spent a brief time at the London School of Economics. He was Principal of King's College London from 1920 to 1927, and subsequently became Professor of Political Science in the University of Cambridge in 1928, being the first holder of the chair endowed by the Rockefeller Foundation.

In June 1936 he was elected to serve on the Liberal Party Council. He was knighted in 1944. He was elected a Foreign Honorary Member of the American Academy of Arts and Sciences in 1958.

Barker was married twice, firstly in 1900 to Emily Isabel Salkeld, with whom he had a son and two daughters; she died in 1924. In 1927 he married Olivia Stuart Horner; they had a son, Nicolas Barker, and a daughter.

Barker died on 17 February 1960. There is a memorial stone to him in St Botolph's Church, Cambridge.

== Works ==
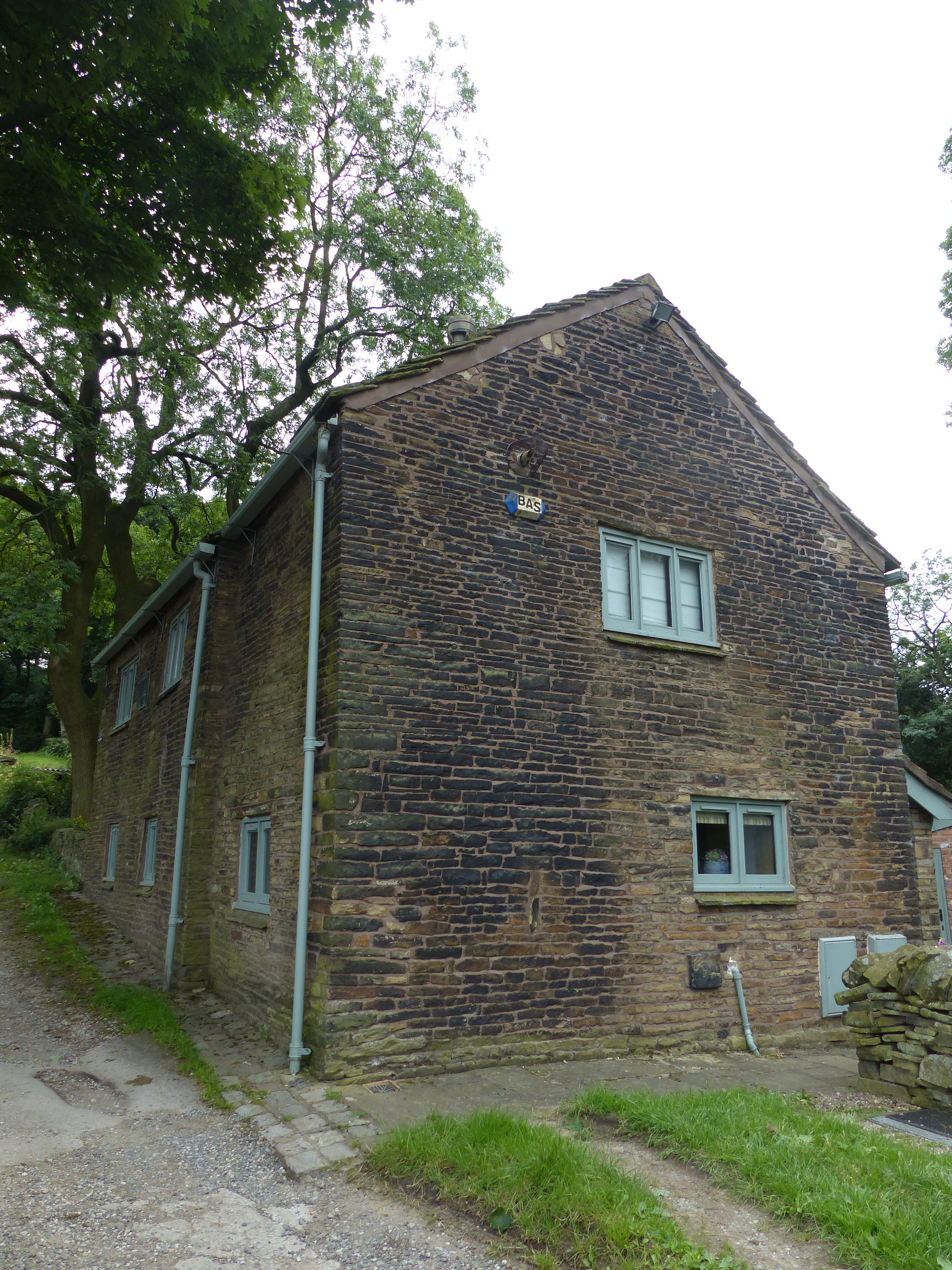
Barker's birthplace in Woodley, Cheshire

- The Political Thought of Plato and Aristotle (1906)
- The Republic of Plato (1906)
- "Author:Ernest Barker" . Encyclopædia Britannica (11th ed.). 1911.
- Ernest Barker, H. W. Carless Davis, C. R. L. Fletcher, Arthur Hassall, L. G. Wickham Legg, F. Morgan, Why We Are at War: Great Britain's Case, by Members of the Oxford Faculty of Modern History (Oxford: Clarendon Press, 1914)
- The Dominican Order and Convocation. A Study of the Growth of Representation in the Church during the Thirteenth Century (Oxford: Clarendon Press, 1913)
- Political Thought in England from Herbert Spencer to the present day: 1848-1914 (1915)
- Greek Political Theory: Plato and his Predecessors (1918)
- Ireland in the last Fifty Years: 1866-1918 (1919)
- The Crusades (1923). A later edition of the Encyclopædia Britannica article, edited with additional notes.
- Church, State and Studies: Essays. London: Methuen & Co., Ltd. 1930.
- Translator's Introduction (1934) to Otto von Gierke, Natural Law and the Theory of Society (1934)
- Oliver Cromwell and the English People (1937)
- Britain and the British People (1942)
- Reflections on Government (1942)
- "The Development of Public Services in Western Europe 1660-1930" (1944)
- The Politics of Aristotle (1946)
- Character of England edited (1947)
- Traditions of Civility (1948)
- Principles of Social and Political Theory (1951)
- Essays On Government (1951)
- (introduction to:) Golden Ages of the Great Cities (1952)
- (as editor with George Clark & Paul Vaucher) The European Inheritance (3 volumes, 1954)
- Age and Youth: Memories of Three Universities and the Father of Man (1953)
- Social Contract: Essays by Locke, Hume, and Rousseau (1956)

Academic offices
Preceded by Ronald Burrows	Principal of King's College London; 1920–1927	Succeeded by William Reginald Halliday
