= Green Street, Mayfair =

Street in Mayfair, London, England

Coordinates: 51.5127°N 0.1547°W

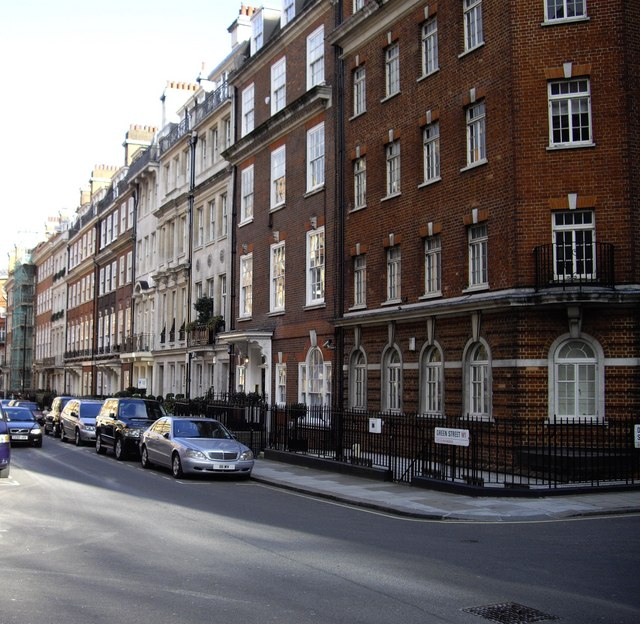
Green Street, 2009

Green Street is a street in Mayfair, London. It has been built up since the mid-18th century, but most of the current properties date from the late 19th and early 20th century. It has had a number of significant residents, including various members of the British aristocracy, the James Bond author Ian Fleming, and the Beatles.

== Location ==
The road runs west to east from Park Lane to North Audley Street via Dunraven Street and Park Street, and is part of the Grosvenor Estate. It is presumed to be named after a local builder, John Green, who worked in the area until he was accidentally killed in 1737, when he fell down a well in nearby Upper Grosvenor Street.

== History ==
Green Street garden in October 1916

Some building had begun on Green Street in the 1720s, but the entire road took some time to fully develop owing to a building slump in the late 1730s and throughout the 1740s, and was not completely built up until the 1760s. Unlike some local streets in Mayfair, it was not initially considered a fashionable or desirable address.

Only one mid-18th-century property survives into the 21st century; Hampden House at Nos. 60–61, which was originally two houses. The architect Roger Morris lived at No. 61 from 1730 until his death in 1749. The name is derived from the Hampden family, who took ownership of the two properties in 1756 and extensively rebuilt and modified them to give the current single property.

From 1882 to the early 1920s, the remainder of Green Street was demolished and rebuilt, predominantly in redbrick or terracotta backed houses. The Grosvenor Office allocated a communal garden on the south side of the street, which lies between Park Street and Dunraven Street. Nos. 2–11 were constructed between 1891 and 1895, all but one by Matthews, Rogers and Company and designed by Maurice Charles Hulbert. The exception was No. 10 which was built for St John Brodrick (the future Earl of Midleton) and designed by Balfour and Turner. Nos. 25–31, architect Robert William Edis, constructed between 1891 and 1894. The properties were built in four stages in conjunction with development on the adjoining Park Street; No. 25 did not begin redevelopment until 1893, two years after work started on No. 26.

No. 32 was designed for Thomas Lister, 4th Baron Ribblesdale by Sidney R. J. Smith and constructed between 1897 and 1899. It replaced a group of 18th-century buildings on Green Street and north along Dunraven Street. Smith was chosen as architect owing to his work on the Tate Gallery, which was then under construction. The house was built using Portland stone dressings and Westmorland slate, and included a white marble staircase with a wrought iron balustrade. In 1931, Queen Mary (consort of George V) suggested the house should be available as a royal residence for her daughter Mary, Princess Royal and son-in-law Henry Lascelles, 6th Earl of Harewood. The Princess and Earl lived at the house until the outbreak of World War II, and the house was sold back to the Grosvenor Estate in 1946. It subsequently became the offices of the Brazilian Embassy. In 2011, the embassy was sold to private development for £40 million.

The south side of Green Street between Dunraven Street and Park Street was redeveloped in the 1910s, under the direction of Hugh Grosvenor, 2nd Duke of Westminster. Most of the properties were rebuilt between 1912 and 1916, with the exception of Nos. 36–37 and 47 at either end of this block, which were reconstructed in the 1920s. Nos. 36–37 were built for the merchant Sir Percy Newson.

== Residents ==
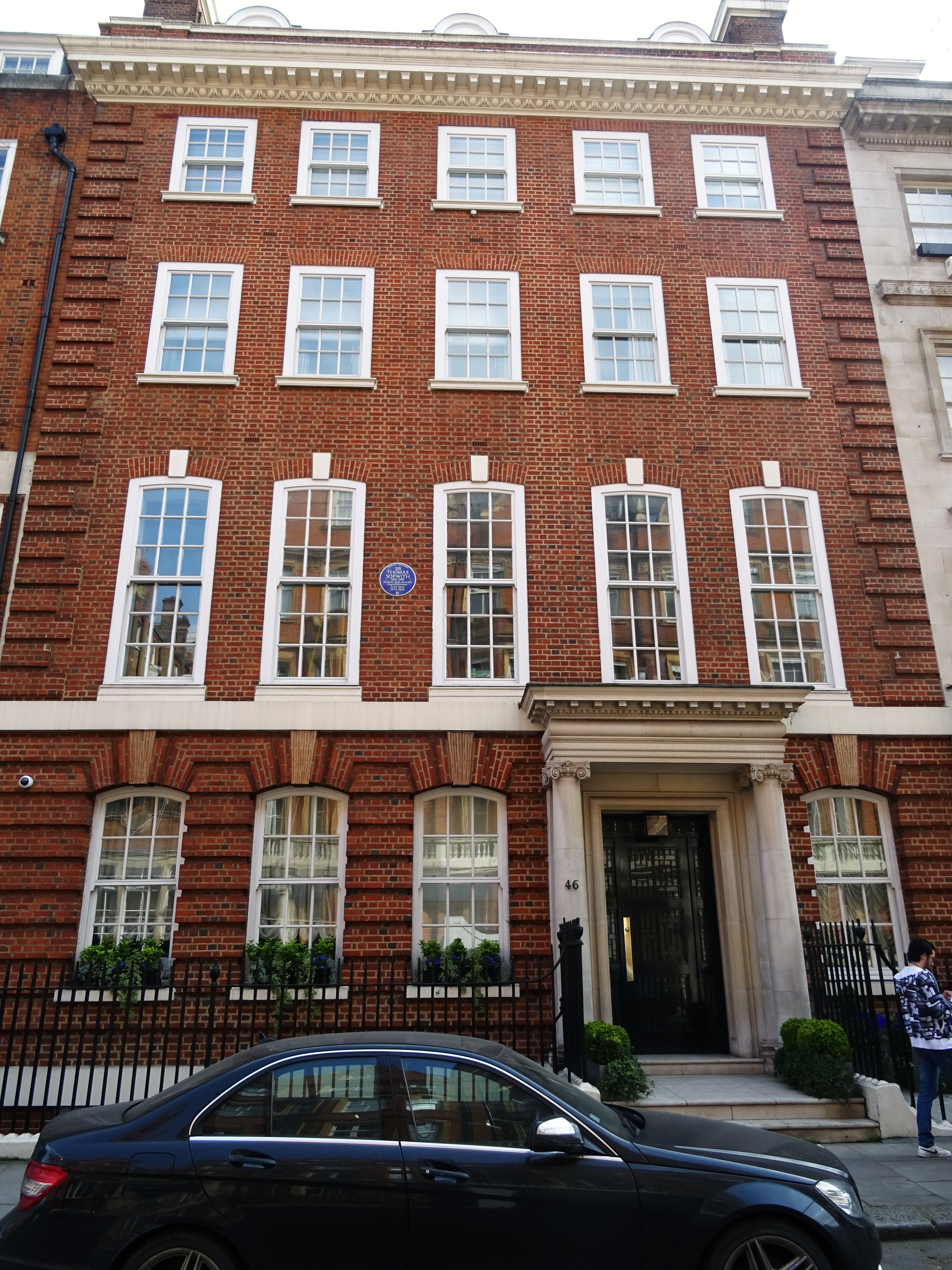
No. 46 with a blue plaque commemorating Sir Thomas Sopwith

The poet and author William Blake lived at No. 23 Green Street from 1782 to 1784. The wit, writer and Anglican cleric, Sydney Smith, lived at No. 56, and died there in 1845. By 1862, the obstetrician Gustavus Murray was living in Green Street, where he also had his consulting rooms.

The politician, sportsman and future Secretary of State for the Colonies, Alfred Lyttelton lived at No. 4 Green Street from 1893 to 1895. The Admiral Edward Southwell Sotheby lived at No. 26 between 1894 and his death in 1902. Henry Parnell, 4th Baron Congleton lived at No. 28 between 1902 and his death four years later. His son, the 5th Baron subsequently lived there until his death in 1914, and was succeeded by his brother, the 6th Baron who lived there until 1925. The James Bond author Ian Fleming was born at No. 27 on 28 May 1908, while the first class cricketer Anthony Lawrence grew up on Green Street in the 1910s.

The tobacco manufacturer Sir Louis Baron lived at No. 57 Green Street from 1915 to 1930. The aircraft designer and manufacturer Sir Thomas Sopwith lived at No. 46 from 1934 to 1940. A blue plaque now commemorates his time there.

Most of the houses on Green Street were divided into flats during the 20th century. When the Beatles first arrived in London in 1963, they stayed at the Hotel President in Bloomsbury before taking a lease on an apartment at No. 57, and this was the only London address where all four ever lived together.

The fashion designer Alexander McQueen lived at No. 7 Green Street. In 2010, he died by suicide, hanging himself at his flat.

John Wickham Legg, personal physician to Prince Leopold, Duke of Albany, lived at No. 47, and his son Leopold Wickham Legg, editor of the Dictionary of National Biography, was born there.
