= Charles Petty-Fitzmaurice, 9th Marquess of Lansdowne =

British peer, landowner and army officer (born 1941)

The Most Honourable The Marquess of Lansdowne LVO DL

Member of Wiltshire County Council
- In office 1970–1985

Personal details
- Born: Charles Maurice Petty-Fitzmaurice; 21 February 1941 (age 85)
- Party: Conservative
- Spouses: Lady Frances Helen Mary Eliot (m. 1965; div. 1987) Fiona Mary Merritt (after 1987)
- Parent(s): George Petty-Fitzmaurice, 8th Marquess of Lansdowne; Barbara Chase
- Education: Eton College

Military service
- Allegiance: United Kingdom
- Branch/service: Kenya Regiment, Royal Yeomanry, Royal Armoured Corps
- Rank: Lieutenant

Charles Maurice Petty-Fitzmaurice, 9th Marquess of Lansdowne, LVO, DL (born 21 February 1941), styled Earl of Shelburne between 1944 and 1999, is a British peer, landowner and army officer.

He was Vice-Lord Lieutenant of Wiltshire from 2012 to 2016, having served on a rural district council in the 1960s, chaired North Wiltshire District Council in the 1970s, and served for fifteen years on Wiltshire County Council.

He is also Earl of Kerry in the peerage of Ireland (1722); Earl of Shelburne and Earl of Wycombe in the peerage of Great Britain (1753 and 1784); Viscount Clanmaurice, Viscount Fitzmaurice (1751), and Viscount Calne and Calston; the 30th Baron of Kerry and Lixnaw in the peerage of Ireland (1181); Baron Dunkeron, and Baron Wycombe.

== Early life ==
Lansdowne is the elder son of George Petty-Fitzmaurice, 8th Marquess of Lansdowne, a Conservative politician and landowner, by his marriage to Barbara, daughter of Harold Stuart Chase, of Santa Barbara, California. His father inherited the peerage titles (and the Bowood House estates in Wiltshire) from a cousin, the 7th Marquess of Lansdowne, who was killed in action in 1944, when the present Marquess became known as the Earl of Shelburne, a courtesy title. He was educated at Eton College and was Page of Honour to Queen Elizabeth II in 1956–1957.

== Career ==
Lord Shelburne (as he then was) served in the Kenya Regiment from 1960 to 1961. In 1962 he was gazetted a Second Lieutenant in the Royal Wiltshire Yeomanry and in 1971 transferred with the rank of Lieutenant to the Royal Yeomanry, attached to the Royal Armoured Corps.

He was a member of Calne and Chippenham Rural District Council from 1964 to 1973, President of the Wiltshire Playing Fields Association from 1965 to 1974, a member of Wiltshire County Council from 1970 to 1985, and a councillor of North Wiltshire District Council from 1973 to 1976. He chaired Calne and Chippenham Rural District Council from 1970 to 1973 and then North Wiltshire District Council from 1973 to 1976. He also served as a member of the South West Economic Planning Council from 1972 to 1977 and chaired its Population Settlement Pattern Working Committee during the same period. He was a member of the Historic Buildings and Monuments Commission (English Heritage) from 1983 to 1989; Deputy President of the Historic Houses Association from 1986 to 1988, and President from 1988 to 1993; President of South West Tourism from 1989 to 2006; President of the Wiltshire Association of Boys Clubs and Youth Clubs from 1976 to 2003; and President of the North Wiltshire Conservative Association from 1986 to 1989.

At the 1979 general election, he contested Coventry North East for the Conservatives, coming second behind Labour's George Park.

In 1990, he was appointed a Deputy Lieutenant of Wiltshire and served as the Vice Lord Lieutenant of Wiltshire from 2012 to 2016. He was President of the Wiltshire Historic Buildings Trust from 1994 and also of the Wiltshire Swindon & Oxfordshire Canal Partnership, which oversaw the restoration of the Wilts & Berks Canal, from 2002 to 2019.

On 25 August 1999, his father died and he became Marquess of Lansdowne and a member of the House of Lords.

From 1996 to 2001, Lansdowne was a member of the Prince's Council of the Duchy of Cornwall.

== Personal life ==
In 1956, Lansdowne's sister Lady Caroline Petty-Fitzmaurice died in a shooting accident, aged seventeen. On 18 February 1965, his mother also died from shotgun injuries in the gunroom at her Scottish home, Meikleour House, which was also found to have been an accident.

On 9 October 1965, as Lord Shelburne, he married Lady Frances Helen Mary Eliot (6 March 1943 – 6 January 2004), daughter of Nicholas Eliot, 9th Earl of St Germans; they were divorced in 1987, having had four children:

- Lady Arabella Helen Mary Petty-Fitzmaurice, now Lady Arabella Haldane Unwin (born 1966), married Rupert William Haldane Unwin, and has three children.
- Lady Rachel Barbara Violet Petty-Fitzmaurice (born 1968), married James Spickernell and has four children.
- Simon Petty-FitzMaurice, Earl of Kerry (born 24 November 1970), married Nadine Mentior in January 2016, and has one child - George Henry Charles Petty-FitzMaurice, Viscount Calne and Calston who was born on 3 February 2020.
- Lord William Nicholas Charles Petty-Fitzmaurice (born 1973), married in 2004 Rebecca Sansum (born 1982), of Chippenham, Wiltshire; and have three daughters.

Subsequently, Lansdowne married secondly Fiona Mary Merritt (born 1954), daughter of Donald Merritt and Lady Davies, an interior decorator known by her earlier married name of Fiona Shelburne. She was appointed a Deputy Lieutenant of Wiltshire in 2019, and as High Sheriff for 2022–2023. She is one of the official Queen's companions to Queen Camilla.

The heir apparent to the peerages is Simon, Earl of Kerry (born 1970).

== Honours and arms ==
- Lieutenant of the Royal Victorian Order, 2001

=== Arms ===
Coat of arms of Charles Petty-Fitzmaurice, 9th Marquess of Lansdowne
Coronet A Coronet of a Marquess Crest 1st, a beehive beset with bees, diversely volant, proper; 2nd, a centaur drawing a bow and arrow, proper, the part from the waist argent. Escutcheon Quarterly : 1st and 4th Ermine, on a bend, azure a magnetic needle pointing at a polar star, or, (Petty); 2nd and 3rd Argent, a saltier, gules, a chief, ermine (Fitzmaurice). Supporters Two pegasi, ermine.; bridled, crined, winged, and unguled, or, each charged on the shoulder with a fienr-de-lis, azure. Motto Virtute non verbis (By courage, not words).

== See also ==
- 1973 Wiltshire County Council election

Court offices
Preceded by Hon. Simon Scott	Page of Honour; 1956–1957	Succeeded by Oliver Russell
Peerage of Great Britain
Preceded by George Petty-FitzMaurice	Marquess of Lansdowne; 1999–present	Incumbent
Orders of precedence in the United Kingdom
Preceded by The Marquess of Lothian	Order of Precedence of the United Kingdom	Followed by The Marquess Townshend
