= Nicholas Litlyngton =

Prior and abbot of Westminster Abbey

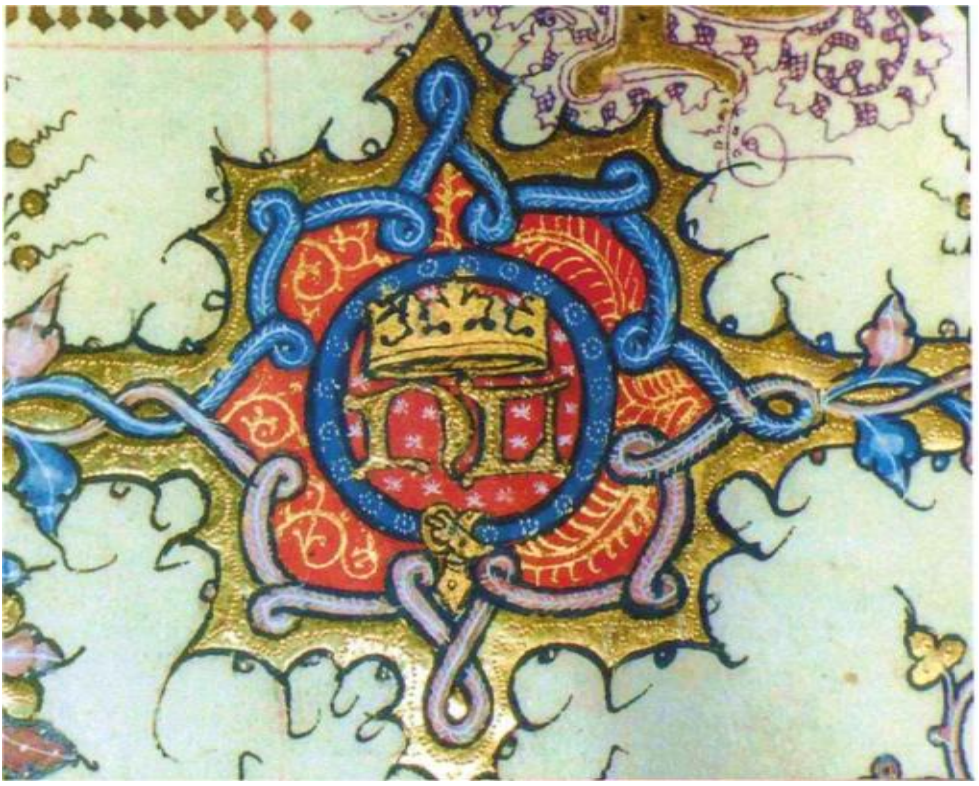
Nicholas's monogram, from his missal

Nicholas Litlyngton, also spelled Litlington or Littlington (died 29 November 1386), was successively prior and abbot of Westminster Abbey.

Nicholas born, probably in Littleton, before 1315 to Hugh and Joan. He was a member of the Despenser family and used their coat of arms. He endowed anniversary masses for his parents at Hurley Priory and Great Malvern Priory. He entered Westminster in or before 1333.

Nicholas was elected prior in 1350 and abbot in 1362. He continued the programme of his predecessor, Simon Langham, to restore the monastery to its former glory following the Black Death. He finished work on the cloister and built a new infirmary. Recruitment also rose and the number of monks approached former levels. Langham remained a generous donor to the abbey until his death in 1376, when Nicholas executed his will. In 1373–1374, Nicholas represented Edward Despenser in England while he was taking part in the Great Chevauchée in France.

Nicholas regularly attended parliament in Westminster. In October 1378, he attended in Gloucester to defend his actions in admitting an alleged traitor, Robert Hawley, into the abbey, where he was murdered. He commissioned the Litlyngton Missal in 1383–1384 for the monastery. During the invasion scare of 1386, he purchased armour in order to help defend against the French. He died at his house in La Neyte on 29 November and was buried with his armour in the chapel of Saint Blaise on 17 December.
