= Leopold George Wickham Legg =

English academic historian

- Born: 22 March 1877
- Died: 19 December 1962 (aged 85); Winchester, United Kingdom
- Education: Winchester College and New College, Oxford
- Occupations: Historian and editor
- Spouse: Olive Maud Lindsay (m. 1915–1962)
- Children: Three daughters, one son
- Relatives: John Wickham Legg (father), Frank Willan (son-in-law)
- Military career
- Allegiance: United Kingdom
- Branch: Royal Naval Volunteer Reserve
- Rank: Lieutenant

Leopold George Wickham Legg (22 March 1877 – 19 December 1962) was an English academic historian specializing in diplomatic history.

An Oxford don from 1908 to 1948, for the Great War Legg was commissioned into the Royal Naval Volunteer Reserve. Apart from his own research work, he was editor of the Dictionary of National Biography.

== Early life and education ==
Born in the parish of St George Hanover Square, Westminster, in 1877, the son of John Wickham Legg (1843–1921), a physician and writer on ecclesiology, and his wife Eliza Jane, the young Legg was named after Prince Leopold, Duke of Albany (1853–1884), for whom his father was personal physician. His parents were then living at 47, Green Street, Mayfair, and he was christened at All Saints, Margaret Street, on 31 March 1877 by William Legg, Rector of Hawkinge in Kent.

== Career ==
Legg was educated at Winchester and New College, Oxford, and was a Fellow of his college from 1908 to 1948.

In 1914, shortly after the beginning of the First World War, Legg contributed to Why We Are at War: Great Britain's Case, a book giving a comprehensive account of the causes of the war, with chapters including "The neutrality of Belgium and Luxemburg", "The growth of alliances and the race of armaments since 1871", "The development of Russian policy", "Chronological sketch of the Crisis of 1914", and "The new German theory of the State". He then joined the Royal Naval Volunteer Reserve, serving throughout the war, and in January 1919 was a temporary lieutenant.

After the war, he returned to his fellowship at New College. His next book was a study of Matthew Prior.

From 1944 to 1946, Legg was the principal editor for the Dictionary of National Biography, taking responsibility for supervising new entries.

== Personal life ==
In 1915, at St Martin-in-the-Fields, Westminster, Legg married Olive Maud, a daughter of William Percival Lindsay, Writer to the Signet, of Edinburgh. They had three daughters, and one son, Kenneth, who died at Abingdon in 1939 aged fifteen.

On 11 October 1945, in the chapel of New College, Oxford, their daughter Joan married Frank Willan, a Royal Air Force pilot. Their daughter Olive married Edward T. Stewart-Jones in Chelsea in 1950.

At the time of his death in December 1962, Legg was of 34, St Cross Road, Winchester, and died in the city at the Park House Nursing Home. He left an estate valued at £17,153, and probate was granted to Group Captain F. A. Willan CBE and E. T. Stewart-Jones, metallurgist. His widow survived him until 1976.

== Selected works ==
- Leopold George Wickham Legg, English Coronation Records (Westminster: A. Constable & Co., 1901)
- Leopold George Wickham Legg, Select documents illustrative of the history of the French revolution (Oxford: Clarendon Press, 1905)
- L. G. Wickham Legg, “The Concordats”, in The Cambridge Modern History, Vol. IX (1906)
- Leopold George Wickham Legg, C. H. Firth, Sophie Crawford Lomas, Notes on the Diplomatic Relations of England and France (Oxford: B. H. Blackwell, 1909)
- Ernest Barker, H. W. Carless Davis, C. R. L. Fletcher, Arthur Hassall, L. G. Wickham Legg, F. Morgan, Why We Are at War: Great Britain's Case, by Members of the Oxford Faculty of Modern History (Oxford: Clarendon Press, 1914)
- Leopold George Wickham Legg, Matthew Prior: a study of his public career and correspondence (Cambridge University Press, 1921)
- Leopold George Wickham Legg, British diplomatic instructions, 1689-1789 (London: Office of the Society, 1922)
- L. G. W. Legg, ed., The Dictionary of National Biography: 1931–40 (Oxford University Press, 1950, ASIN B0043KPRJM)
