= Anthony Lawrence (cricketer) =

English cricketer and British Army officer

Personal information
- Full name: Anthony Sackville Lawrence
- Born: 25 March 1911; Mayfair, London, England
- Died: 17 March 1939 (aged 27); Westminster, London, England
- Batting: Right-handed
- Bowling: Left-arm medium

Domestic team information
- Years: Team
- 1932–1933: Cambridge University
- 1933: Marylebone Cricket Club

Career statistics
Competition	First-class
Matches	14
Runs scored	575
Batting average	26.13
100s/50s	0/4
Top score	80
Balls bowled	1,277
Wickets	9
Bowling average	58.55
5 wickets in innings	0
10 wickets in match	0
Best bowling	3/33
Catches/stumpings	7/–
- Source: ESPNcricinfo, 22 April 2019

Anthony Sackville Lawrence (25 March 1911 – 17 March 1939) was an English first-class cricketer and British Army officer. After attending the University of Cambridge, where he played first-class cricket for Cambridge University Cricket Club, Lawrence served with the Coldstream Guards from 1933 until his death in 1939. During his military service he also represented the British Army cricket team in first-class cricket.

== Life, first-class cricket and military career ==
The son of Dr Gwynne Lawrence, he was born at Mayfair, where he resided at Green Street. He was educated at Harrow School, where he captained the school cricket, football, rugby and running teams, before going up to Trinity Hall, Cambridge. While attending Cambridge he was a second lieutenant in the Cambridge University contingent of the Officers' Training Corps. He made his debut in first-class cricket while at Cambridge, playing for the Free Foresters against Cambridge University in June 1932 at Fenner's. The following week he made his debut for Cambridge University against Sussex. Lawrence played first-class cricket for Cambridge twice in 1932, following that up with nine appearances in 1933. He scored a total of 384 runs in his eleven first-class matches for Cambridge, at an average of 24.00 and a high score of 52 not out. He gained a cricket blue in 1933. He also appeared in one first-class match for the Marylebone Cricket Club (MCC) against the South at Lord's in 1933, scoring 61 in the MCC first-innings.

After graduating from Cambridge, Lawrence chose a career in the British Army, enlisting with the Coldstream Guards. He was promoted to the rank of lieutenant in January 1935. In that same year he played a first-class match for the British Army cricket team against Cambridge University, scoring 80 runs opening the batting in the Army's first-innings. He served in Palestine during the Arab revolt prior to serving as the aide-de-camp to John Loder, the Governor of New South Wales, until relinquishing his appointment in October 1938. He died at Westminster in March 1939, following an illness.
