= 1981 Wiltshire County Council election =

1981 UK local government election

← 1977	7 May 1981	1985 →
Party	Conservative	Labour	Liberal
Party	Independent
- The County of Wiltshire within England
Party before election
Conservative
Elected Party
Conservative

Elections to Wiltshire County Council were held on Thursday, 7 May 1981, following boundary changes to the county's electoral divisions. The whole council of seventy-four members was up for election and the result was that the Conservatives retained their control, winning forty seats. Labour ended with twenty county councillors, the Liberals twelve, and Independents two, including one Ratepayer.

== Election result ==
Result of Wiltshire County Council election, 1981
Party	Seats	Gains	Losses	Net gain/loss	Seats %	Votes %	Votes	+/−
Conservative	40				54.1			
Liberal	20				27.0			
Labour	12				16.2			
Independent	2				2.7			
