= H. W. C. Davis =

British historian

H. W. C. Davis CBE FBA
- Born: 13 January 1874; Ebley, Gloucestershire, England, United Kingdom
- Died: 28 June 1928 (aged 54); Edinburgh, Scotland, United Kingdom
- Education: Weymouth College; Balliol College, Oxford
- Occupation: Historian
- Known for: Editor of the Dictionary of National Biography
- Title: Regius Professor of Modern History
- Term: 1925–1928
- Predecessor: Charles Harding Firth
- Successor: Maurice Powicke

Henry William Carless Davis (13 January 1874 – 28 June 1928) was a British historian, editor of the Dictionary of National Biography, and Oxford Regius Professor of Modern History.

== Early career ==
Davis was born in Ebley, near Stroud, Gloucestershire the eldest of five children of Henry Frederick Alexander Davis, a solicitor, and his wife, Jessie Anna Carless. The children were brought up by their mother, who moved to Weymouth in 1884 to open a school for young children including her own, and was successful enough to be appointed first headmistress of Weymouth College preparatory school in 1903. Davis attended Weymouth College from 1886 and went up to Balliol College, Oxford on a Brackenbury history scholarship, where he attained first classes in classical moderations in 1893 and literae humaniores in 1895 as well as the Jenkiyns exhibition. He was elected to a fellowship at All Souls College, Oxford, maintaining residence there from 1895 until 1902, and spending time teaching at University College, Bangor between 1896 and 1897. Davis won the Lothian Prize in 1897 and was appointed to a lectureship at New College, Oxford, and in 1899 exchanged lectureships and moved to Balliol, where on the expiration of his All Souls fellowship in November 1902 he was appointed a fellow of Balliol.

In 1899 Davis published Balliol College, a work in the College Histories series, and in 1900, Charlemagne, in the Heroes of the Nations series, as well as articles in the English Historical Review in 1901. In 1903 he published the article The Anarchy of Stephen's Reign in the same journal, which presented the idea that the use of the term 'waste' in the Pipe Rolls indicated a much wider devastation resulting from the Anarchy than had been thought, fuelling the belief that a great anarchy occurred during Stephen's reign, although the 'waste' theory was later discredited. His first widely regarded book was England under the Normans and Angevins, published in 1905, it became a standard authority and reached a tenth print edition in 1930. It was, however, his only substantial contribution to narrative medieval history. In 1911 he wrote the summary Medieval Europe, in the Home University Library series, but from 1905 was more focused on editorial work, preparing an edition of Benjamin Jowett's translation of Aristotle's Politics, a revision of William Stubbs' Select Charters and starting the calendar of royal charters, Regesta regum Anglo-Normannorum.

His academic presence inspired genuine respect and regard, and his lectures were well attended. Davis was junior dean of Balliol from 1906 until 1910, and an examiner in the final school of modern history between 1907 and 1909, and again from 1919 to 1921. In 1912 Davis married Jennie Rosa, the daughter of Walter Lindup, of Bampton Grange in Oxfordshire. In 1913 he took the Chichele lectureship in foreign history, and became a curator of the Bodleian Library in 1914.

== War years ==
The First World War drew Davis' attention away from academia, and he assisted in the production of a series of Oxford Pamphlets on the war and published a dispassionate analysis, The Political Thought of Heinrich von Treitschke. In early 1915 Davis moved to London and assisted the organization of the Trade Clearing House, a body sponsored by the Admiralty and Board of Trade to pool intelligence on commercial trade gathered from the postal censorship. When the Trade Clearing House grew and became the War Trade Intelligence Department and part of the Ministry of Blockade, under the Foreign Office, Davis became the vice-chairman. He later wrote of the department's workings in History of the Blockade, but left the work unfinished.

On 7 October 1918 Jennie Rosa gave birth to Ralph Henry Carless Davis, who became a historian of the Middle Ages.

In December 1918 at the conclusion of the war Davis served on the British delegation to the Paris Peace Conference until March 1919, and then spent a few weeks as the acting director of the Department of Overseas Trade at the invitation of Sir Arthur Steel-Maitland and in the New Years Honours of that year, Davis was made Commander of the Order of the British Empire (CBE).

== Return to Oxford ==
In April 1919 Davis returned to Oxford and resumed his usual college and university work. He took up the editorial directorship of the Dictionary of National Biography, for which the previous editor, Sir Sidney Lee, had conveyed responsibility to the University of Oxford in 1917. The names for inclusion in the dictionary and list of contributors were chosen by Davis and his co-editor J. R. H. Weaver, in consultation with a committee from Oxford and outside advisors. The volume of which Davis was in charge was published in 1927, and covered 1911 to the end of 1921. Davis accepted the chair of modern history at Manchester University in 1921, and he moved to Bowdon, spending three and a half years in the post. Davis was elected Ford's lecturer at Oxford for 1924–25; his posthumously printed The Age of Grey and Peel was his chosen subject material. During Hilary term 1925, Davis was appointed to succeed Sir Charles Firth as Regius Professor of Modern History, making him a fellow of Oriel College. Before the end of the year, Davis was elected an honorary fellow of Balliol and a fellow of the British Academy.

In addition to his duties in Oxford, Davis took up a post on the unemployment insurance committee under fellow Balliol man Robert Younger, Baron Blanesburgh, and in 1927 he went to Geneva as British representative on a committee set up by the International Labour Organization to investigate and report on factory legislation in Europe. While in Edinburgh for the University of Edinburgh's examinations, Davis died of pneumonia after a few days' illness, at 19 Great King Street. His body was interred at Wolvercote Cemetery, Oxford.

== Works ==
- Balliol College' (London: F.E. Robinson and Company, 1899)
- Charlemagne (Charles the Great): The Hero of Two Nations (London: G.P. Putnam's Sons, 1900)
- The Anarchy of Stephen's Reign (English Historical Review, 1903)
- England Under the Normans and Angevins, 1066–1272 (London: Methuen and Company, 1905; 10th ed. 1930)
- Medieval Europe (London: Williams and Norgate, 1911)
- The Political Thought of Heinrich von Treitschke (London: Constable and Company, 1914)
- Ernest Barker, H. W. Carless Davis, C. R. L. Fletcher, Arthur Hassall, L. G. Wickham Legg, F. Morgan, Why We Are at War: Great Britain's Case, by Members of the Oxford Faculty of Modern History (Oxford: Clarendon Press, 1914)
- Davis, H. W. C.; Clark, G. N. (ed.), Europe from 800 to 1789 (London: Methuen & Co., 1930) posthumously published
