= John Lindow Calderwood =

John Lindow Calderwood CBE (22 January 1888 – 7 February 1960) was an English solicitor, a British Army officer, and an independent politician in Wiltshire, in the west of England. He was chairman of Wiltshire County Council from 1949 until his death in 1960.

== Early life ==
Calderwood was born at 57, Main Street, Egremont, Cumberland, on 22 January 1888, the son of Dr George Calderwood, a surgeon of Beech House, Egremont, by his marriage to Mary Eleanor Lindow. He was educated at St Bees School and later at Caius College, Cambridge, where he matriculated on 1 October 1906.

The name Lindow came to him from his mother, one of the Lindow family of Ingwell and Whitehaven, who had mining and other interests in Egremont. His cousin Jonas Lindow JP was county councillor for Egremont North, while his father was Medical Officer to Cumberland County Council.

== Career ==
Calderwood was admitted a solicitor in November 1912 and joined the law firm of Townsend, Wood & Calderwood, of Cricklade Street, Swindon, Wiltshire. Shortly after the outbreak of the First World War, he was commissioned as a Second Lieutenant into the 15th Battalion, the King's Liverpool Regiment, rising to the rank of captain in the King's Royal Rifles and being mentioned in dispatches. In 1919, he relinquished his commission.

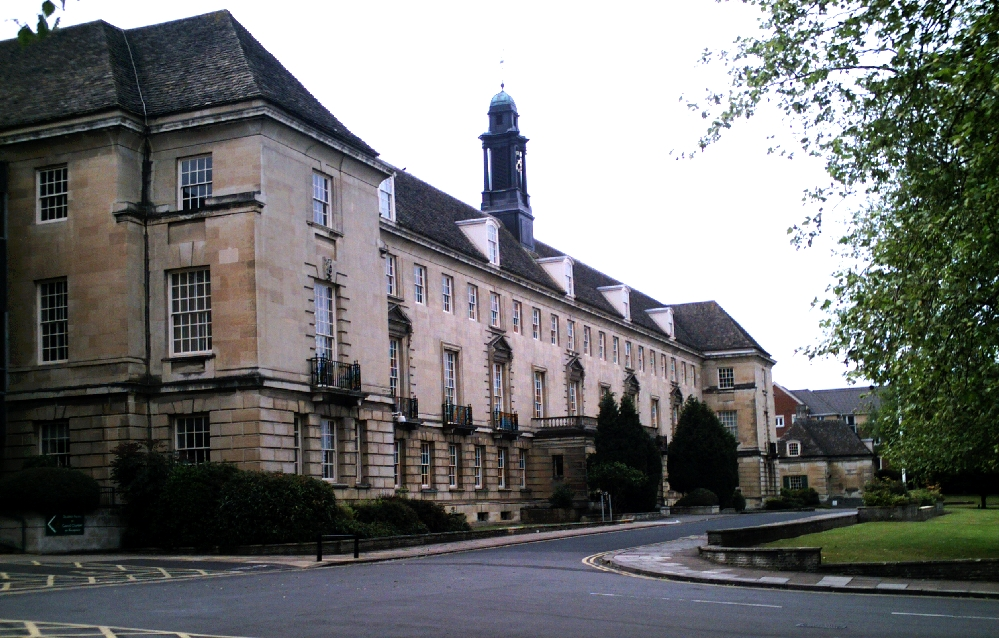
Wiltshire County Council's main building

He returned to Swindon as a partner in Townsend, Wood & Calderwood, and during the 1920s he sometimes served as a liquidator. In 1929, his partnership with John Crewe Wood was dissolved and Calderwood thereafter carried on the firm of Townsend, Wood & Calderwood as a sole partner.

From the 1930s until his death Calderwood lived at The Hermitage, High Street, Swindon. In 1933, he enlarged the house. In 1935, he donated to the Borough of Swindon a chain of office for the mayoress.

Elected to Wiltshire County Council, he served as chairman of its Standing Orders Committee from 1947 to 1960, as chairman of its Selection Committee from 1946 to 1960, and as chairman of the Council from 1949 until his death in 1960. He was also appointed an alderman.

Calderwood was for several years a member of the Committee of the Wiltshire Victoria County History and briefly served as its chairman in 1959–1960. He died at Swindon on 7 February 1960, at the age of 72, and the next volume of A History of the County of Wiltshire to appear noted that

Alderman W. R. Robins, the first Chairman of the Committee, died in 1959, shortly after his resignation from the Committee, and his successor, Alderman J. L. Calderwood, in 1960. Both of them played a vital part in forming the Committee and in guiding its early steps beneficently. They have thus earned the lasting thanks of the learned world.

== Honours ==
In 1957, Calderwood was appointed a Commander of the civil division of the Order of the British Empire.
