= C. R. L. Fletcher =

Charles Robert Leslie Fletcher (22 October 1857 – 30 April 1934) was an English historian.

He was the son of Alexander Pearson Fletcher and Caroline Anna (daughter of the painter Charles Robert Leslie). From 1868 to 1876 he was King's Scholar at Eton College. He gained a first class degree in modern history from Magdalen College, Oxford in 1880. He was elected a Fellow of All Souls College, Oxford the year after. He was tutor of Magdalen from 1883 to 1906, becoming a Fellow in 1889. He married Alice Merry in 1885 and they had three sons.

Fletcher was a strong Conservative, imperialist and Protestant Anglican. His School History of England included 23 new poems by Rudyard Kipling but was viewed suspiciously by the Oxford University Press due to Fletcher's controversial views on foreigners and democracy. Fletcher said democracy was still on trial in Britain, and claimed that the King would be obliged to dismiss any government that tried to reduce the size of the Royal Navy or surrendered India or the colonies.

== Works ==
- Gustavus Adolphus and the Struggle of Protestantism for Existence (1890)
- Introductory History of England, 5 vols. (John Murray, 1904 to 1923) – LCCN 04-32282, with e-copy at HathiTrust
- Mr. Gladstone at Oxford 1890 (1908)
- School History of England (Oxford: Clarendon Press, 1911), with Rudyard Kipling, illus. Henry Ford – LCCN a12001066, with e-copy at HathiTrust
- Ernest Barker, H. W. Carless Davis, C. R. L. Fletcher, Arthur Hassall, L. G. Wickham Legg, F. Morgan, Why We Are at War: Great Britain's Case, by Members of the Oxford Faculty of Modern History (Oxford: Clarendon Press, 1914)
- Edmond Warre (1922) (See Edmond Warre.)
- Historical Portraits (1909 to 1919), with H. B. Butler and Emery Walker
