= John Wickham Legg =

English physician and theological writer (1843-1921)

John Wickham Legg (28 December 1843 – 28 October 1921) was an English physician who published on medical subjects, liturgy and ecclesiology.

== Life and career ==
He was the third son of the printer and bookseller George Legg, and was born at Alverstoke near Portsmouth in Hampshire, England, on 28 December 1843. He was educated at Winchester College and from there he went to New College, Oxford and subsequently opted to read Medicine at University College, London, where he studied under Sir William Jenner. Having qualified as a member of the Royal College of Surgeons, he was recommended by Jenner for the post of medical attendant to Prince Leopold, Queen Victoria's fourth son, later styled Duke of Albany, a haemophiliac. Though the appointment lasted only a year, the young Legg became a favourite of the Prince's wife, Princess Helen, and of their daughter, Princess Alice, Countess of Athlone.

In 1867, Legg studied in Berlin and upon his return he obtained his M.D. Having been granted membership of the Royal College of Physicians, he was appointed curator of the Pathological Museum at University College. He began to publish and in 1870 became Casualty Physician at St Bartholomew's Hospital, London. About this time he took up liturgical studies as a hobby.

In 1872 Legg married Eliza Jane Houghton and they had a son, Leopold George, in 1877.

The medical publications continued, but the liturgical studies also progressed. In 1875 Legg was elected a fellow of the Society of Antiquaries. In 1878 he became Assistant Physician at Bart's and the following year began to lecture on Pathology. The liturgical hobby surfaced publicly in 1879 when he became a founder member of the re-established St Paul's Ecclesiological Society and with an 1881 essay on liturgical colours. The medical career was still unflagging, for in 1883 he gave the Bradshaw Lecture to the Royal College of Physicians on cardiac aneurisms. However, ill health then intervened. Following two attacks of rheumatic fever, Legg resigned his offices in 1887 and gave away his medical books, retiring for the winter to Cannes.

In 1888 Legg faced the public with the first fruits of a series of editions he was to produce in the next three decades: an edition with Cambridge University Press of the reformed breviary devised and published by Cardinal Quiñones in 1535.

Having developed a taste for this line of work, Legg dedicated his energies, social graces and connections to consolidating it. He was the prime mover behind the foundation in 1890 of the Henry Bradshaw Society, which on the model of the Surtees Society aimed at publishing manuscripts and rare printed works in volumes issued to subscribing members. Fittingly enough for a Society inaugurated in the Jerusalem Chamber of Westminster Abbey, Legg contributed as its first publication a monumental edition of the manuscript Westminster Missal.

An important figure in the history of coronation in the British monarchy (The Coronation of the Queen (1898), Three Coronation Orders (1900)), Legg passed the passions for this topic to his son, Leopold George Wickham Legg, who published English Coronation Records (1901).

Legg's publications continued until the last major work, the edition of the Sarum Missal which he published with Oxford University Press in 1916. He died at the home of his son, Leopold, by then a Fellow of New College, Oxford, on 28 October 1921, and was buried in Saltwood, Kent.

== Sources ==
- A. Ward & C. Johnson, "John Wickham Legg (1843-1921)", in Ephemerides Liturgicae 97 (1983) 70-84 (with Legg's bibliography).
