= Robert Hugh Willan =

Brigadier Robert Hugh Willan DSO MC
- Born: 6 September 1882
- Died: 4 May 1960 (aged 77)
- Relatives: Frank Willan (father); Frank Willan (son)
- Military career
- Allegiance: United Kingdom
- Branch: British Army
- Service years: 1902–1938; 1939–1942
- Rank: Brigadier
- Commands: 10th Infantry Brigade (1934–1938); 1st Divisional Signals (1925–1929)
- Conflicts: First World War; Second World War
- Awards: Distinguished Service Order; Military Cross; Mentioned in Despatches

Brigadier Robert Hugh Willan, DSO, MC (6 September 1882 – 4 May 1960) was an officer in the British Army.

Willan was a lieutenant in the 4th (Oxford Militia) Battalion, Oxfordshire Light Infantry, when he received a commission as second lieutenant in The King's Royal Rifle Corps on 7 May 1902.

He served in the First World War and was awarded the Distinguished Service Order (DSO) in 1916 and the Military Cross (MC).

He was Commander of the 10th Infantry Brigade, 1934–38 and concurrently Aide-de-camp to Kings George V, Edward VIII and George VI.

He married Violet Crabbe, daughter of Brigadier General Eyre Crabbe. They had two sons: Martin Stuart Willan was killed in action during the fall of France in 1940; the other was (Frank) Andrew Willan, RAF officer and Tory local politician.

He died in 1960 and his funeral was held in Salisbury.
