= Litlyngton Missal =

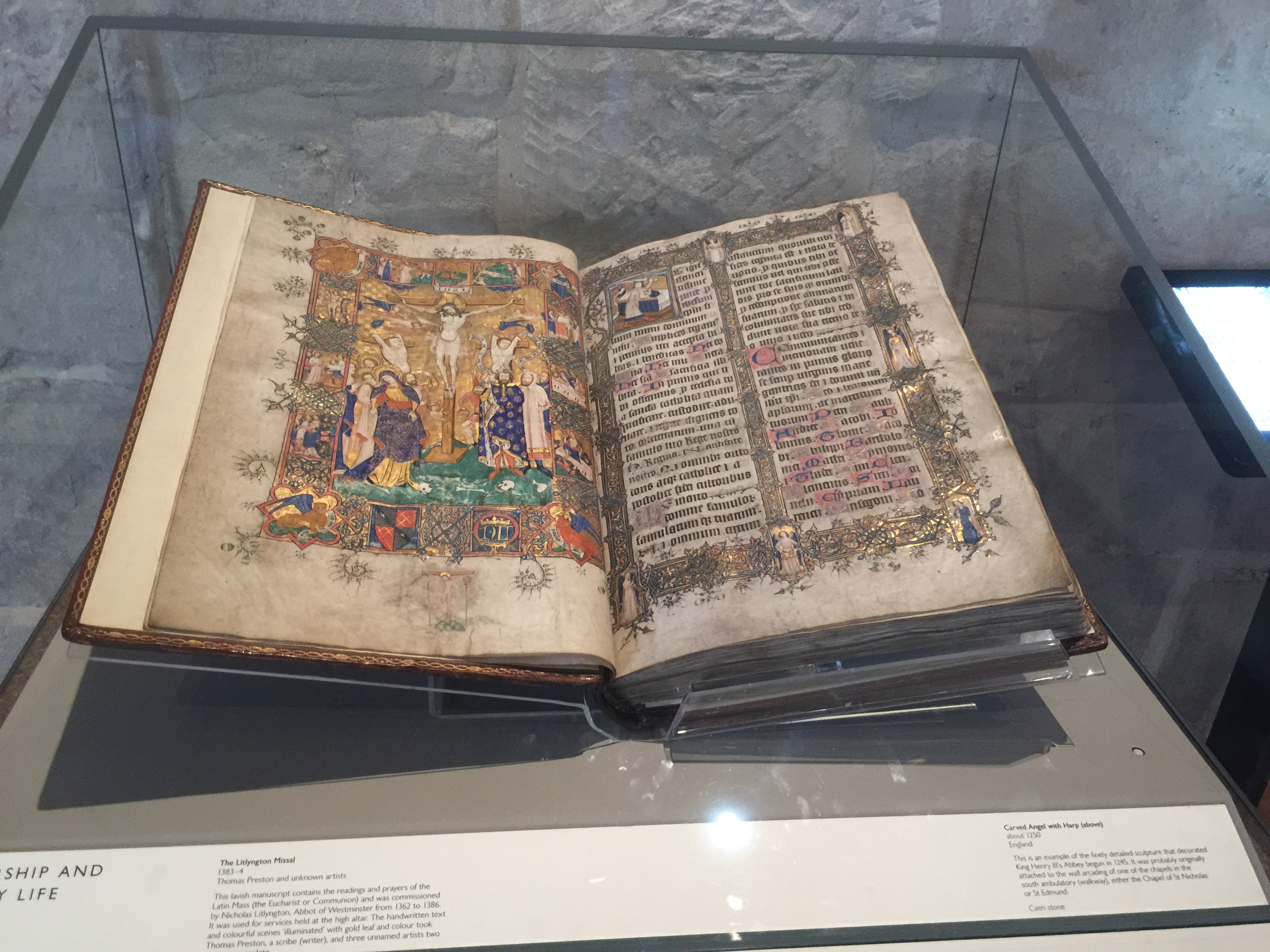
The book on display in the abbey

The Litlyngton Missal, also called the Westminster Missal (Latin Missale ad usum ecclesie Westmonasteriensis), is an illuminated manuscript commissioned by Abbot Nicholas Litlyngton in 1383–1384 and donated by him to his monastery, Westminster Abbey, where it has remained ever since. It is a Catholic missal with text in Latin.

== Bibliography ==
- Trowles, Tony (2001). "Review of The Westminster Missal (Missale ad usum Ecclesiae Westmonasteriensis), ed. John Wickham Legg (Woodbridge: Boydell Press, for Henry Bradshaw Society, 2000)". The English Historical Review. 116 (469): 1254.
- Wackett, Jayne (2014). The Litlyngton Missal: Its Patron, Iconography, and Messages (PDF) (PhD dissertation). University of Kent.
