= 1985 Wiltshire County Council election =

1985 UK local government election

Elections to Wiltshire County Council were held on 2 May 1985. The whole council of seventy-five members was up for election and the result was that the Conservatives lost their majority, winning only thirty seats, resulting in no overall control. The Liberals gained seats, winning seventeen, the Social Democrats won eight seats, the first time they had been represented in the council, while Labour had losses, finishing like the Liberals with seventeen members. Three Independents, including one Ratepayer, were also elected.

In an editorial on 4 May headed "Local Lessons", The Times commented that "The Conservatives predominate as the single largest party in the counties still. Generalizations from such elections are always flawed by local factors. Intra-party disputes help explain the loss of Conservative seats in Wiltshire".

Following the elections, an informal agreement between the leader of the Liberal group, Jack Ainslie, and the leader of the Labour members, Mary Salisbury, led to the formation of a minority SDP–Liberal Alliance administration. Salisbury commented to The Times "Where the Liberals put forward what seem to be measures which are beneficial to the people of Wiltshire, we will support them."

== Election result ==
Wiltshire local election result 1985
Party	Seats	Gains	Losses	Net gain/loss	Seats %	Votes %	Votes	+/−
Conservative	30			-10	40.0			
Liberal	17			+5	22.7			
Labour	17			-3	22.7			
SDP	8			+8	10.7			
Independent	3			+1	4.0			

== Results by divisions ==
=== Aldbourne and Ramsbury ===
Aldbourne and Ramsbury
Party	Candidate	Votes	%	±%
Alliance	John Bernard Ainslie	2,012	67.0	
Conservative	K. Eaton	855	28.5	
Labour	W. Barlow	136	4.5	
Majority		1157		
Alliance hold		Swing		

=== Alderbury ===
Alderbury
Party	Candidate	Votes	%	±%
Conservative	A. W. M. Christie-Miller	1,438	64.8	
Alliance	A. Maclachan	664	29.9	
Labour	I. Tomes	117	5.3	
Majority		774		
Conservative hold		Swing		

=== Amesbury ===
Amesbury
Party	Candidate	Votes	%	±%
Alliance	A. J. F. Haywood	1,193	55.9	
Conservative	T. Heffernan	943	44.1	
Majority		250		
Alliance gain from Conservative		Swing		

=== Bedwyn ===
Bedwyn
Party	Candidate	Votes	%	±%
Conservative	H. D. Rogers	1,199	74.1	
Alliance	T. Williams	418	25.9	
Majority				
Conservative hold		Swing		

=== Blunsdon ===
Blunsdon
Party	Candidate	Votes	%	±%
Labour	J. W. H. Archer	1,520	57.9	
Alliance	Ms P. Pascoe	970	37.0	
Ecology	H. Stredder	133	5.1	
Majority		550		
Labour hold		Swing		

=== Box ===
Box
Party	Candidate	Votes	%	±%
Conservative	F. Naylor	1,054	40.2	
Alliance	Ms B. Oakes	870	33.2	
Labour	J. Eglinton	695	26.5	
Majority		184		
Conservative hold		Swing		

=== Bradford on Avon North ===
Bradford on Avon North
Party	Candidate	Votes	%	±%
Alliance	H. J. Owen	1,601	56.2	
Conservative	Robert George Ian Elliott	1,246	43.8	
Majority		355		
Alliance gain from Conservative		Swing		

=== Bradford on Avon South ===
Bradford on Avon South
Party	Candidate	Votes	%	±%
Conservative	Mrs Margaret Purves	909	40.9	
Alliance	G. Turner	883	39.8	
Labour	J. D. Childs	428	19.3	
Majority		26		
Conservative hold		Swing		

=== Bremhill and Calne Without ===
Bremhill and Calne Without
Party	Candidate	Votes	%	±%
Conservative	Robert Andrew Raymond Syms	1,196	47.3	
Alliance	G. Greer	945	36.4	
Labour	H. Kirkbride	386	15.3	
Majority		251		
Conservative hold		Swing		

=== Brinkworth ===
Brinkworth
Party	Candidate	Votes	%	±%
Conservative	R. Carter	1,530		
Alliance	Ms J. Stratton	858		
Labour	W. Andrews	142		
Majority		672		
Conservative hold		Swing		

=== Calne ===
Calne
Party	Candidate	Votes	%	±%
Alliance	Mrs E. Hornby	1,200		
Conservative	E. Miller	594		
Labour	A. Donald	575		
Majority		606		
Alliance hold		Swing		

=== Chippenham Park ===
Chippenham Park
Party	Candidate	Votes	%	±%
Alliance	J. Henning	891		
Conservative	Ms E. Winterton	836		
Labour	R. Haynes	329		
Majority		55		
Alliance gain from Conservative		Swing		

=== Chippenham Sheldon ===
Chippenham Sheldon
Party	Candidate	Votes	%	±%
Alliance	June Margaret Wood	1,416		
Conservative	J. Scott	994		
Labour	A. Day	782		
Majority		422		
Alliance hold		Swing		

=== Chippenham Town ===
Chippenham Town
Party	Candidate	Votes	%	±%
Alliance	Ms M. Fallon	2,267		
Conservative	E. Taylor	1,209		
Labour	J. Coadwell	321		
Majority		1,058		
Alliance hold		Swing		

=== Collingbourne ===
Collingbourne
Party	Candidate	Votes	%	±%
Alliance	H. Crawford	1,130		
Conservative	D. Fopp	598		
Labour	J. Davidson	282		
Majority		532		
Alliance gain from Conservative		Swing		

=== Corsham ===
Corsham
Party	Candidate	Votes	%	±%
Conservative	John Bright	1,054		
Alliance	D. Pope	899		
Labour	Ms C. Reid	282		
Majority		155		
Conservative hold		Swing		

=== Cricklade ===
Cricklade
Party	Candidate	Votes	%	±%
Alliance	Reginald John Coole	1,480		
Conservative	R. Thompson	573		
Labour	J. D’Lemos	75		
Majority		907		
Alliance hold		Swing		

=== Devizes ===
Devizes
Party	Candidate	Votes	%	±%
Conservative	P. Gates	742		
Alliance	Ms P. A. Morris	696		
Labour	I. Hopkins	499		
Majority		46		
Conservative gain from Alliance		Swing		

=== Devizes South and Cannings ===
Devizes South and Cannings
Party	Candidate	Votes	%	±%
Conservative	Patricia Rugg	1,416		
Alliance	C. Gillington	1,052		
Labour	Ms S. Williams	442		
Majority		364		
Conservative hold		Swing		

=== Downton ===
Downton
Party	Candidate	Votes	%	±%
Conservative	R. Peach	1,216		
Alliance	C. Tate	667		
Labour	K. Willis	377		
Independent	H. Farris	336		
Majority		549		
Conservative hold		Swing		

=== Durrington ===
Durrington
Party	Candidate	Votes	%	±%
Conservative	C. E. Robinson	651		
Independent	R. Steadman	589		
Labour	Ms A. Read	422		
Alliance	Ms F. Crombie	269		
Majority		62		
Conservative gain from Independent		Swing		

=== Highworth ===
Highworth
Party	Candidate	Votes	%	±%
Labour	Ms M. Haines	1,867		
Conservative	D. F. Morley	1,238		
Majority		629		
Labour hold		Swing		

=== Holt ===
Holt
Party	Candidate	Votes	%	±%
Alliance	George Frederick James Hawkins	1,232		
Conservative	P. Beale	983		
Majority		249		
Alliance gain from Conservative		Swing		

=== Idmiston ===
Idmiston
Party	Candidate	Votes	%	±%
Conservative	Ms H. Mead	1,004		
Alliance	Ms G. Gent	843		
Labour	M. Sheehan	157		
Majority		161		
Conservative hold		Swing		

=== Kington ===
Kington
Party	Candidate	Votes	%	±%
Alliance	M. Adams	1,102		
Conservative	Brenda Margaret Wyrill	1,018		
Labour	C. Phillips	236		
Majority		84		
Alliance gain from Conservative		Swing		

=== Laverstock ===
Laverstock
Party	Candidate	Votes	%	±%
Conservative	R. C. Lodge	1,037		
Alliance	D. Crombie	765		
Labour	I. Hollingworth	202		
Majority		272		
Conservative hold		Swing		

=== Lavington ===
Lavington
Party	Candidate	Votes	%	±%
Conservative	Derek Bernard William Jarvis	1,460		
Labour	Ms P. Day	622		
Majority		838		
Conservative hold		Swing		

=== Malmesbury ===
Malmesbury
Party	Candidate	Votes	%	±%
Alliance	H. Price	1,954		
Conservative	R. Clarke	1,307		
Labour	M. Tavener	223		
Majority		647		
Alliance gain from Conservative		Swing		

=== Marlborough ===
Marlborough
Party	Candidate	Votes	%	±%
Alliance	J. Spanton	1,242		
Conservative	B. Ashley	1,037		
Labour	Ms M. R. Urquhart	328		
Majority		205		
Alliance gain from Conservative		Swing		

=== Melksham ===
Melksham
Party	Candidate	Votes	%	±%
Labour	Mary E. Salisbury	1,502		
Conservative	Ms P. Johnson	642		
Majority		860		
Labour hold		Swing		

=== Melksham Without ===
Melksham Without
Party	Candidate	Votes	%	±%
Conservative	Ms. E. Joyce	1,556		
Labour	P. Colegate	1,081		
Majority		475		
Conservative hold		Swing		

=== Mere ===
Mere
Party	Candidate	Votes	%	±%
Conservative	Robert George Catton	1,236		
Alliance	S. Head	821		
Labour	Ms S. Potten	257		
Majority		415		
Conservative hold		Swing		
