= Wiltshire Fire and Rescue Service =

Operational area
- Country: United Kingdom
- Country: England
- County: Wiltshire

Agency overview
- Established: 1948
- Employees: ~700

Facilities and equipment
- Stations: 24

Wiltshire Fire and Rescue Service was the county-wide, statutory emergency fire and rescue service for the ceremonial county of Wiltshire, England between 1948 and 2016.

Created in 1948 from a number of smaller more local fire brigades, until 1997 the service was a division of Wiltshire County Council. After 1997, when the Borough of Swindon was separated from the county of Wiltshire to become a new unitary authority, the service was administered by a combined fire authority of thirteen members, nine appointed by Wiltshire Council and four by Swindon Borough Council, called the Wiltshire and Swindon Combined Fire Authority. The members were appointed annually.

The fire and rescue service's headquarters was at Manor House, Potterne, near Devizes, where there was also a training centre.

With effect from 1 April 2016, the service was merged into the new Dorset and Wiltshire Fire and Rescue Service.

== See also ==
- Fire services in the United Kingdom
