= Willans =

Willans may mean:

== People ==
- Herbert Geoffrey Willans, (4 February 1911 – 6 August 1958), an English author and journalist, is best known as the co-creator, with the illustrator Ronald Searle, of Nigel Molesworth
- Owen Willans Richardson, (26 April 1879 – 15 February 1959), was a British physicist who won the Nobel Prize in Physics in 1928
- Joel Willans (b. 1972), British copywriter and author
- John Bancroft Willans (1881–1957) landowner and philanthropist
- John William Willans (c.1845-1895) Chief Engineer of the Liverpool Overhead Railway, and father of John Bancroft Willans

== Firms ==
- Willans (company), British-based safety harness provider
- Willans & Robinson, were manufacturing engineers of Thames Ditton, Surrey. Later, from 1896, at Victoria Works, Rugby, Warwickshire, England

== Other ==
- Willans engine, was a high-speed stationary steam engine used for electricity generation around the start of the 20th century
- Willans Hill Miniature Railway, in Wagga Wagga, New South Wales, Australia
