= Henry Calley =

English pilot, owner and manager of a stud farm and Conservative politician

Sir Henry Algernon Calley DSO DFC DL (9 February 1914 – 12 August 1997), known as Henry Algernon Langton until 1974, was an English pilot, owner and manager of a stud farm, and Conservative politician.

== Life ==
The son of the Rev. Algernon Charles Mainwaring Langton and of his wife Elizabeth Ina Calley, Henry Algernon Langton was educated at St John's School, Leatherhead.

From 1933 to 1935 he taught at Corchester, Corbridge, then for a year worked for the Bombay Burmah Trading Corporation, before returning to teaching until 1938. He attended the Hendon Police College and served in the Metropolitan Police from 1938 to 1941, then joined the Royal Air Force, in which he served until 1948. He was one of the first policemen to transfer to the Air Force, as until 1941 serving officers in the police were not allowed to join any of the British Armed Forces.

During the Second World War, he was a pilot in bombers. He received the Distinguished Flying Cross in 1943, was promoted Acting Wing Commander in 1944 and was awarded the Distinguished Service Order in 1945.

The 1943 citation for his Distinguished Flying Cross reads:

This officer has completed a tour of bombing operations in the Middle East during which his ability on operational flying has been equalled only by his sterling work on the ground. At the commencement of his tour he was three times forced to return to base with only one engine functioning. In April 1943 he was captain of an aircraft, the elevator controls of which broke. With great skill and coolness he flew the aircraft back and, although it was damaged on landing and he was injured, the crew escaped without injury. Despite these trying experiences Flight Lieutenant Langton continued to fly on operations with undiminished enthusiasm.

In 1945, when he received the Distinguished Service Order, the Air Ministry Bulletin reported:

Throughout two tours of operational duty, Squadron Leader Langton has shown outstanding courage and determination and has led a large number of attacks against heavily defended targets. A typical example of his coolness in the face of the enemy took place in November 1944. This officer was detailed for a daylight attack against a well defended bridge in Yugoslavia. Despite the very heavy anti-aircraft fire, he made a straight run over the target at 9,500 feet, released his bombs and secured an excellent photograph. Both in the air and on the ground, Squadron Leader Langton has set an inspiring example and, largely owing to his untiring efforts and devotion to duty, the squadron has attained a high standard of operational efficiency.

Wiltshire County Council's banner

From 1948 until his death he was the owner and manager of a stud farm in Wiltshire. In 1955 he was elected as a member of Wiltshire County Council and served as Chairman of its Finance Committee from 1959 to 1968 and as Chairman of Council from 1968 to 1973. He was also Chairman of the Wessex Area of the National Union of Conservative and Unionist Associations, from 1963 to 1966.

In 1968, he was appointed a Deputy Lieutenant for Wiltshire, when he was described as "Wing Commander Sir Henry Algernon Langton, D.S.O., D.F.C., Overtown House, Wroughton, Swindon".

From 1969 until 1974 he was Chairman of the Committee of the Wiltshire Victoria County History.

Knighted in 1964, in 1974 he changed his surname from Langton to Calley. The Times reported:

Sir H. Langton has changed his name by deed poll to Calley. He was a beneficiary in the will of a cousin. He said "The hope was expressed in the will that I would change my name. My mother was a Calley".

== See also ==
- List of chairmen of Wiltshire County Council
