= List of chairmen of Wiltshire County Council =

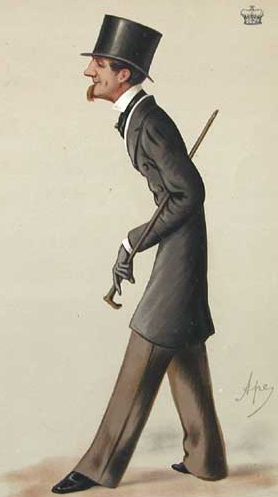
The 4th Marquess of Bath, first Chairman of the County Council, by "Ape", 1874

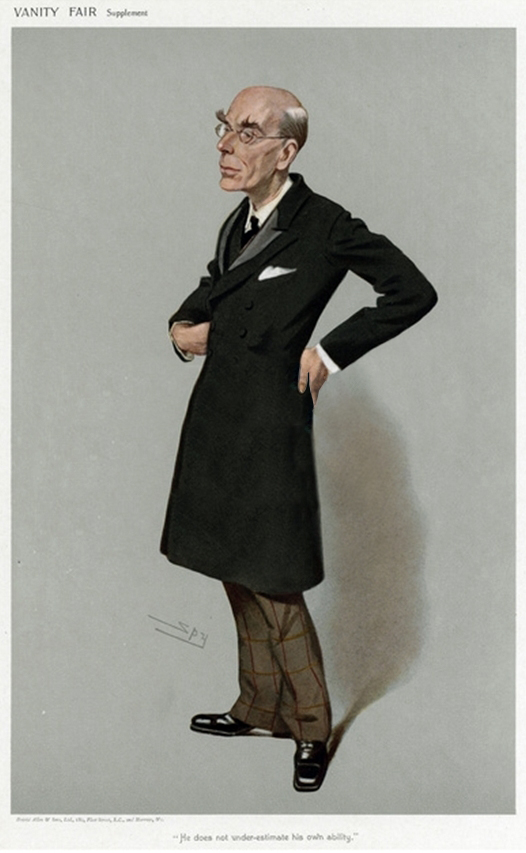
Lord Edmond Fitzmaurice (later created Baron Fitzmaurice), second Chairman of the County Council, by "Spy", 1906

This is a list of the Chairmen of Wiltshire County Council and its successor, Wiltshire Council.

== Indefinite term of office ==
- 1889–1896: John Thynne, 4th Marquess of Bath
- 1896–1906: Lord Edmond Fitzmaurice MP
- 1906–1946: Thomas Henry Thynne, 5th Marquess of Bath
- 1946–1949: Colonel R. W. Awdry
- 1949–1960: J. L. Calderwood
- 1960–1969: Major S. V. Christie-Miller
- 1969–1973: Sir Henry Langton, later Calley
- 1973–1980: Group Captain Frank Willan
- 1980–1985: Nigel James Moffat Anderson
- 1985–1986: Captain P. S. Beale RN
- 1986–1989: J. B. Ainslie
- 1989–1992: Mary E. Salisbury

== Chairmen for one year ==
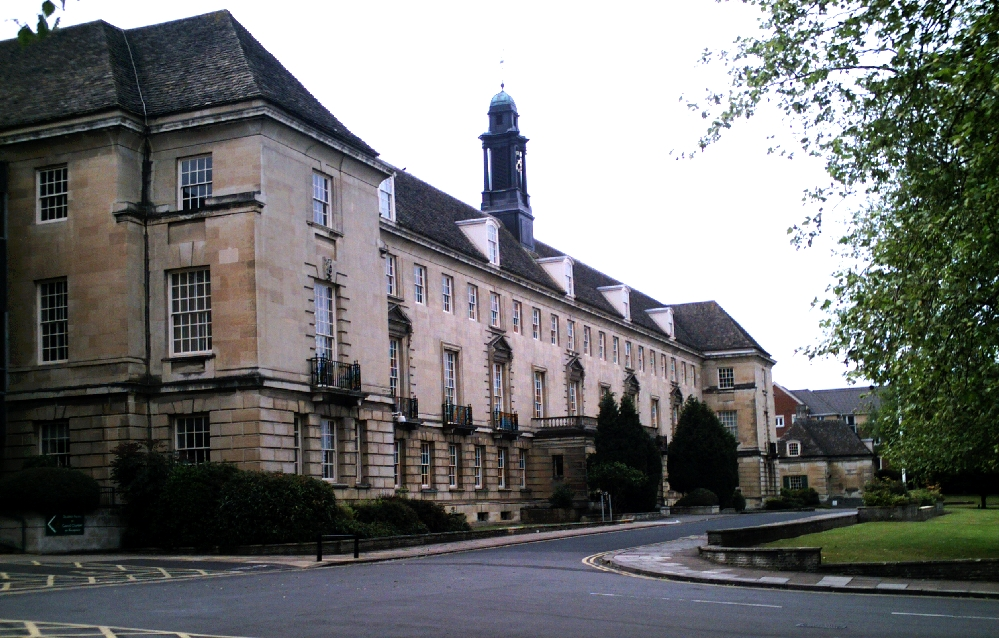
County Hall, Trowbridge, the council's headquarters, before 2012 refurbishment

- 1992–1993: Marjorie Whitworth
- 1993–1994: Patricia Rugg
- 1994–1995: Percy L. Jefferies
- 1995–1996: Dorothea Joan Main
- 1996–1997: June Wood
- 1997–1998: Grace Hill
- 1998–1999: Beryl M. Jay
- 1999–2000: Brigadier Robert Baddeley
- 2000–2001: Lt. Colonel D. B. W. Jarvis
- 2001–2002: J. P. Johnson
- 2002–2003: Carole Soden
- 2003–2004: Jerry Willmott
- 2004–2005: Allan Peach
- 2005–2006: Bill Moss
- 2006–2007: Kevin Wren
- 2007–2008: Judy Seager
- 2008–2009: Brigadier Robert Hall

== Chairmen of Wiltshire Council ==
- 2009–2012: Brigadier Robert Hall
- 2012–2014: Christine Crisp
- 2014–2015: Roy While
- 2015–2017: Richard Britton
- 2017–2019: Alison Bucknell
- 2019–2020: James Sheppard
- 2020–2021: Richard Gamble
- 2021–2023: Stuart Wheeler
- 2023–2024: James Sheppard
- 2024–2025: Bridget Wayman
- 2025–present : Laura Mayes
