= George Petty-Fitzmaurice, 8th Marquess of Lansdowne =

British peer (1912–1999)

The Most Honourable The Marquess of Lansdowne PC DL

Minister of State for the Colonies
- In office 20 April 1962 – 16 October 1964
- Monarch: Elizabeth II
- Prime Minister: Harold Macmillan; Alec Douglas-Home
- Preceded by: The Earl of Perth
- Succeeded by: Office abolished

Parliamentary Under-Secretary of State for Foreign Affairs
- In office 23 October 1958 – 20 April 1962
- Monarch: Elizabeth II
- Prime Minister: Harold Macmillan
- Preceded by: The Earl of Gosford
- Succeeded by: Vacant

Lord-in-waiting Government Whip
- In office 11 June 1957 – 23 October 1958
- Monarch: Elizabeth II
- Prime Minister: Harold Macmillan
- Preceded by: The Lord Hawke
- Succeeded by: The Earl of Gosford

Member of the House of Lords Lord Temporal
- In office 30 August 1944 – 25 August 1999; Hereditary Peerage
- Preceded by: The 7th Marquess of Lansdowne
- Succeeded by: The 9th Marquess of Lansdowne

Personal details
- Born: 27 November 1912
- Died: 25 August 1999 (aged 86)
- Party: Conservative
- Spouses: Barbara Dempsey Chase (m. 1938; died 1965) Selina Carnegie (m. 1969; div. 1978) Gillian Anna Morgan (m. 1978) Penelope Astor (m. 1995)
- Children: 4, including Charles, 9th Marquess of Lansdowne
- Parents: Lord Charles Mercer Nairne; Lady Violet Elliot-Murray-Kynynmound; The 1st Baron Astor of Hever (stepfather)
- Relatives: The 5th Marquess of Lansdowne (paternal grandfather)

George John Charles Mercer Nairne Petty-Fitzmaurice, 8th Marquess of Lansdowne, DL (27 November 1912 – 25 August 1999), was a British peer and Conservative politician.

== Background ==
Petty-Fitzmaurice was the only son of Lord Charles Mercer Nairne, the second son of Henry Petty-FitzMaurice, 5th Marquess of Lansdowne. His father was killed in action in 1914 while on active service in the First World War, and his mother, the former Lady Violet Elliot-Murray-Kynynmound, later married secondly John Jacob Astor, 1st Baron Astor of Hever.

He was educated at Eton and Christ Church, Oxford, and served in the British Army in the Second World War.

In August 1944, Petty-Fitzmaurice's life was significantly changed when his cousins the 7th Marquess of Lansdowne and his younger brother were both killed in action in the War. As a result, he suddenly and unexpectedly inherited the family peerages and estates, except for the Lordship of Nairne, which under Scottish law went to the 7th Marquess's sister Katherine Evelyn Constance Bigham (1912–1995).

== Career ==
Lansdowne became a Justice of the Peace for Perthshire in 1950 and a Deputy lieutenant of Wiltshire in 1952. In 1957 and 1958 he was a Lord-in-Waiting (government whip) and then was Parliamentary Under-Secretary of State at the Foreign Office between 1958 and 1962 and Minister of State for Commonwealth and Colonial Affairs between 1962 and 1964. Effectively his political career was ended by the election of the Labour government of 1964–1970. In 1964 he was appointed as a Privy Councillor.

== Personal life ==
Lansdowne was married four times.

On 18 March 1938 he married firstly Barbara Dempsey Chase (1918–1965), only child of Harold Stuart Chase (1890–1970), a real-estate investor of Santa Barbara, California, and Detroit, Michigan, and his wife, née Gertrude Boyer. The first Lady Lansdowne died on 18 February 1965, from injuries sustained in a shotgun blast in the gunroom at her Scottish home, Meikleour House, found by the police to be an accident. They had four children:

- Lady Caroline Margaret Petty-Fitzmaurice (1939–1956); she, like her mother, died in a shooting accident.
- Charles Maurice Petty-Fitzmaurice (born 1941); later 9th Marquess of Lansdowne.
- Lord Robert Harold Mercer Nairne (born 1947); married Jane Elizabeth Gordon (born 1950), a cousin of Granville Gordon, 13th Marquess of Huntly, and had issue, two sons and one daughter. He is a writer who lives in Scotland on the Mercer-Nairne estates, inherited from his ancestress Emily Jane de Flahaut, 8th Lady Nairne. He has two sons and one daughter:
  - Emily Jane Mercer Nairne (born 1974); married Dominic Robertson, has three daughters.
  - Samuel George Mercer Nairne (born 1976); married Claire Aussudre, and has two sons (born 2009 and 2011) and one daughter.
  - Joseph Douglas Mercer Nairne (born 1980); married Melissa Wakeley, and has one son and one daughter.
- Lady Georgina Elizabeth Petty-Fitzmaurice (1950–2022); married Guy Hamilton in 1974 (divorced 1980), and married Robert Eric Miller in 1981 (divorced 1990). She lived in London and had two children and three grandchildren.
  - Josiah Stirling Hamilton (born 1975); married Justine Miller and lives in Santa Barbara, California - has one son and one daughter.
  - Emma Carissa Hamilton (born 1977); married David Malina and lives in New York City - has one daughter.

On 22 December 1969, Lansdowne married, secondly, Selina Polly Dawson Carnegie, a daughter of David Eccles, 1st Viscount Eccles, and former wife of Robin Andrew Duthac Carnegie, becoming the stepfather of Andrew James Carnegie (born 1963). This marriage ended in divorce in 1978.

On 15 October 1978 Lansdowne married thirdly Gillian Anna Morgan (1936–1982), daughter of Alured A.E. Morgan and his first wife, the former Nancye Little-Jones.

On 12 July 1995, Lansdowne married fourthly Penelope Eve Astor (died 2006), widow of his half-brother John Astor, a former wife of David Rolt, and daughter of Commander George Francis Norton Bradford.

== Arms ==
Coat of arms of George Petty-Fitzmaurice, 8th Marquess of Lansdowne
| Coronet A Coronet of a Marquess Crest 1st, a beehive beset with bees, diversely volant, proper; 2nd, a centaur drawing a bow and arrow, proper, the part from the waist argent. Escutcheon Quarterly : 1st and 4th Ermine, on a bend, azure a magnetic needle pointing at a polar star, or, (Petty); 2nd and 3rd Argent, a saltier, gules, a chief, ermine (Fitzmaurice). Supporters Two pegasi, ermine.; bridled, crined, winged, and unguled, or, each charged on the shoulder with a fienr-de-lis, azure. Motto Virtute non verbis (By courage, not words). |

== Links ==
- George, 8th Marquess of Lansdowne profile, thepeerage.com; Retrieved 1 June 2009.
- Jane Gordon, now Lady Robert Mercer Nairne profile, thepeerage.com; Retrieved 1 June 2009.

Political offices
| Preceded by The Lord Hawke | Lord-in-waiting; 1957–1958 | Succeeded by The Earl of Gosford |
Peerage of Great Britain
| Preceded by Charles Petty-FitzMaurice | Marquess of Lansdowne; 1944–1999 | Succeeded by Charles Petty-FitzMaurice |
