= Nigel Anderson =

British soldier, landowner and Conservative politician

Nigel James Moffatt Anderson, MC, DL, FRGS (1920 – 23 May 2008) was a British soldier, landowner, and Conservative politician in Wiltshire. He was Chairman of Wiltshire County Council from 1979 to 1983 and High Sheriff of Wiltshire in 1991.

== Early life ==
Born in 1920 in Melbourne, Australia, Anderson was educated at Marlborough College from 1934 to 1938 and matriculated at Trinity College, Oxford, in 1938, intending to follow his father and grandfather into the medical profession.

== Career ==
Wiltshire County Council's banner

In 1939, some months before the outbreak of the Second World War, he joined the 4th (Territorial Army) Battalion of the Royal Welsh Fusiliers, and was commissioned a second lieutenant on 27 May 1939. First posted to Northern Ireland, he took part in the Norwegian Campaign of April to June 1940, one of the first British engagements of the war, in which his unit covered the withdrawal of the Scots Guards from Krokstrand. At the age of twenty, he won one of the earliest Military Crosses of the war. On his return from Norway, he was posted to No. 2 Commando and took part in raids on the French coast. He was seriously wounded in 1941.

After the war, Anderson studied geography and anthropology and became a schoolmaster at Radley College. While there, he was the commanding officer of the school's Combined Cadet Force from 1948 to 1953.

In 1952, he inherited from a cousin the Hamptworth estate at Landford near Salisbury in Wiltshire and went to live there the next year.

In 1953, he was first elected to Wiltshire County Council, on which he served for thirty years. He chaired a number of committees, was an alderman of the county, and succeeded Frank Willan as Chairman of the Council from 1979 to 1983, when he retired.

In October 1974, he was Gazetted a Deputy Lieutenant for Wiltshire, and in 1991 he was appointed as the 999th High Sheriff of Wiltshire. From 1981 to 1985 he chaired the committee of the Wiltshire Victoria County History. He was also chairman of the Wiltshire Scouts Association and president of the Wiltshire Youth Orchestra and of the Wiltshire branch of the Country Landowners Association. He died on 23 May 2008, at the age of eighty-eight.

In his book Battling for Peace (1999), Richard Needham, Wiltshire member of parliament and Northern Ireland minister, recalls attending a service at Westminster Abbey in 1991:

The former chairman of the county council and high sheriff for the year, Nigel Anderson, was a redoubtable old soldier who had a profound dislike of Mrs Thatcher and kept muttering "Well done, keep it up" in a loud whisper at every opportunity when there was a lull in the service.

== Family ==
Anderson met his wife, Daphne, while serving with the British Army in Northern Ireland, and they had one son, Donald.

== See also ==
- List of chairmen of Wiltshire County Council
- 1973 Wiltshire County Council election
