= Frank Willan =

English aviator, Royal Air Force officer and Conservative politician

- Born: 21 December 1915
- Died: 12 November 1981 (aged 65); Teffont, Wiltshire
- Relatives: Robert Hugh Willan (father); Frank Willan (grandfather)
- Military career
- Allegiance: United Kingdom
- Branch: Royal Air Force
- Service years: 1937–60
- Rank: Group Captain
- Commands: RAF Feltwell (1958–60); Oxford University Air Squadron (1951–53)
- Conflicts: Second World War
- Awards: Commander of the Order of the British Empire; Distinguished Flying Cross
- Other work: Chairman of Wiltshire County Council (1973–79)

Group Captain Frank Andrew Willan, CBE, DFC, DL (21 December 1915 – 12 November 1981) was an English aviator, Royal Air Force officer and Conservative politician. He was Chairman of Wiltshire County Council from 1973 to 1979.

== Early life ==
The son of Brigadier Robert Hugh Willan, and the grandson of Colonel Frank Willan of Thornehill Park, Bitterne, Hampshire, Willan was educated at West Downs School, Eton College and Magdalen College, Oxford. His grandfather, after whom he was named, was Colonel of the 3rd Oxfordshire Light Infantry, an alderman for Hampshire, a Justice of the Peace and a Deputy Lieutenant.

Willan's brother Martin Stuart Willan was killed in action in northern France on 25 May 1940 at the age of 21, while serving with the King's Royal Rifle Corps as part of the British Expeditionary Force.

== Career ==
Willan was commissioned into the Royal Air Force as a pilot officer with effect from 25 October 1937, and served in the Second World War with RAF Bomber Command, being promoted flight lieutenant with effect from 25 April 1940. After the war, he was Commanding Officer of the Oxford University Air Squadron (1951–53) and of RAF Feltwell (1958–60), before retiring the service in 1960.

Elected a member of Wiltshire County Council in 1961, he continued in that role until his death in 1981. Willan was chairman of the County Council's Education Committee from 1965 to 1968; vice-chairman of Council, 1968 to 1969; and Chairman, 1973 to 1979. Between 1974 and 1981 he was also chairman of the Wiltshire Victoria County History, and he was succeeded in both positions by Nigel Anderson.

Willan was appointed a Commander of the Order of the British Empire (Military Division) in the New Year Honours for 1961, and a Deputy Lieutenant for Wiltshire in 1968. He was also a Member of the Wessex Regional Hospital Board 1970–1974, Chairman of the Salisbury Diocesan Board of Finance 1970–1981, and Chairman of the Joint Advisory Committee on Local Authorities' Purchasing 1970–77.

== Personal life ==
On 11 October 1945, in the chapel of New College, Oxford, Willan married Joan, a daughter of Leopold George Wickham Legg, a fellow of the college, of Boar's Hill, and a granddaughter of the ecclesiologist John Wickham Legg.

He died on 12 November 1981, when he was of Bridges, Teffont Evias, Wiltshire, and left an estate valued at £258,491.

== See also ==
- 1973 Wiltshire County Council election
