= 2007 Kennet District Council election =

(2007) Kennet District Council election

← 2003	3 May 2007

All 43 seats to Kennet District Council 22 seats needed for a majority
	First party	Second party	Third party
	Con	Ind	UKIP
Party	Conservative	Independent	UKIP
Last election	26 seats, 40.9%	8 seats, 17.8%	1 seat, 1.7%
Seats won	33	5	2
Seat change	▲7	▼3	▲1
Popular vote	11,890	3,365	3,148
Percentage	47.3%	13.4%	12.5%
Swing	▲6.4%	▼4.4%	▲10.8%
	Fourth party	Fifth party
	DG	LD
Party	Devizes Guardians	Liberal Democrats
Last election	3 seats, 7.6%	3 seats, 17.0%
Seats won	2	1
Seat change	▼1	▼2
Popular vote	1,391	3,958
Percentage	5.5%	15.7%
Swing	▼2.1%	▼1.3%
- Results of the 2007 Kennet District Council election
Council control before election
Conservative
Council control after election
Conservative

Elections to Kennet District Council were held on 3 May 2007. The whole council was up for election, and the Conservatives comfortably retained control, winning thirty-three of the forty-three seats available.

This was the last election of district councilors to take place in Kennet. The following year, a government review of local government determined that the four district councils of Wiltshire were to be merged with Wiltshire County Council to form a new unitary authority with effect from 1 April 2009, when Kennet would be abolished and its councilors ' term of office would end two years early.

Elections to the new unitary authority, Wiltshire Council, took place in June 2009.

== Election result ==
Kennet District Council elections, 2007
Party	Seats	Gains	Losses	Net gain/loss	Seats %	Votes %	Votes	+/−
Conservative	33	8	2	+6	76.7	47.3	11,890	
Liberal Democrats	1	0	2	–2	2.3	15.7	3,958	
Independent	5	1	4	–3	11.6	13.4	3,365	
UKIP	2	1	0	+1	4.7	12.5	3,148	
Devizes Guardians	2	0	1	–1	4.7	5.5	1,391	
Labour	0	0	1	–1	0	5.5	1,388	

== Ward results ==
=== Aldbourne ===
Aldbourne
Party	Candidate	Votes	%	±%
Conservative	Christopher Humphries	344	47.9	
Independent	Michael Andrew Edmonds	311	43.3	
Labour	Frank Jefferies	63	8.8	
Majority		33		
Turnout			51.2	
Conservative hold		Swing		

=== All Cannings ===
All Cannings
Party	Candidate	Votes	%	±%
Conservative	Tony Molland	461	70.0	
Liberal Democrats	Kate Walling	198	30.0	
Majority		263		
Turnout			42.8	
Conservative hold		Swing		

=== Bedwyn ===
Bedwyn
Party	Candidate	Votes	%	±%
Conservative	Stella Marion Zweck	364	57.4	
Liberal Democrats	David John Walker	270	42.6	
Majority		94		
Turnout			44.0	
Conservative gain from Independent		Swing		

=== Bishops Cannings ===
Bishops Cannings
Party	Candidate	Votes	%	±%
Conservative	Tony Adamson	270	47.9	
Independent	Eric Alan Clark	202	35.8	
Liberal Democrats	Caroline Waters	70	12.4	
Labour	Colin Robert Hopgood	22	3.9	
Majority		68		
Turnout			41.6	
Conservative hold		Swing		

=== Bromham & Rowde ===
Bromham & Rowde (2 seats)
Party	Candidate	Votes	%	±%
Conservative	Janet Mary Giles	734		
Conservative	Philip Alfred Brown	660		
Liberal Democrats	Ralph Andre Frederick Elia	332		
Majority		328		
Turnout			40.2	
Conservative hold		Swing		
Conservative hold		Swing		

=== Burbage ===
Burbage
Party	Candidate	Votes	%	±%
Conservative	Stuart John Kennedy Wheeler	407	69.5	
Liberal Democrats	Jacqueline Watson	179	30.5	
Majority		228		
Turnout			42.8	
Conservative hold		Swing		

=== Cheverell ===
Cheverell
Party	Candidate	Votes	%	±%
Conservative	Lionel Grundy	412	61.5	
UKIP	Christine Ann Cotton	258	38.5	
Majority		154		
Turnout			49.4	
Conservative hold		Swing		

=== Collingbourne ===
Collingbourne
Party	Candidate	Votes	%	±%
Conservative	Charles Howard	332	58.6	
Independent	James Robinson	199	35.1	
Liberal Democrats	Michael Magee	36	6.3	
Majority		133		
Turnout			45.3	
Conservative gain from Independent		Swing		

=== Devizes East ===
Devizes East (3 seats)
Party	Candidate	Votes	%	±%
Devizes Guardians	Tony Duck	706		
Conservative	Peter Evans	563		
Conservative	Julian Beinhorn	508		
Labour	Margaret Sheila Nancy Taylor	450		
Conservative	Alistair Michael John Gagen	324		
Labour	Patricia Baxter	282		
Labour	Noel Woolrych	269		
Liberal Democrats	Bridget Selwyn	260		
UKIP	John Charles Stott	148		
Majority		58		
Turnout			34.2	
Devizes Guardians hold		Swing		
Conservative hold		Swing		
Conservative gain from Labour		Swing		

=== Devizes North ===
Devizes North (2 seats)
Party	Candidate	Votes	%	±%
Conservative	Paula Mary Winchcombe	351		
Conservative	Sue Evans	298		
Devizes Guardians	Nigel Denys Carter	245		
Liberal Democrats	Don Jones	211		
Labour	Sue Buxton	144		
Independent	Ian Richard Porter Hopkins	142		
UKIP	Ernie Giles	136		
Labour	Tim Price	123		
UKIP	John Maurice Ryan	75		
Majority		53		
Turnout			37.3	
Conservative gain from Devizes Guardians		Swing		

=== Devizes South ===
Devizes South (2 seats)
Party	Candidate	Votes	%	±%
Conservative	Ray Parsons	447		
Devizes Guardians	Jeff Ody	440		
Conservative	Charles Stuart Winchcombe	429		
Labour	Ray Taylor	325		
Liberal Democrats	Chris Callow	207		
Labour	Jim Thorpe	207		
Majority		11		
Turnout			44.6	
Conservative hold		Swing		
Devizes Guardians hold		Swing		

=== Ludgershall ===
Ludgershall (2 seats)
Party	Candidate	Votes	%	±%
Conservative	Ken Beard	405		
Conservative	Chris Williams	385		
Liberal Democrats	Nicholas Holgate	154		
UKIP	Tony Still	143		
UKIP	Deborah Anne Holmes	140		
Majority		231		
Turnout			31.3	
Conservative hold		Swing		
Conservative hold		Swing		

=== Marlborough East ===
Marlborough East (2 seats)
Party	Candidate	Votes	%	±%
Independent	Edwina Jean Fogg	481		
Liberal Democrats	Peggy Ann Dow	436		
Conservative	Marian Hannaford-Dobson	405		
Conservative	Paul Gregory Horsnall	285		
Liberal Democrats	John Alexander Kirk Wilson	235		
UKIP	Mike Bird	103		
Majority		31		
Turnout			35.5	
Independent gain from Conservative		Swing		
Liberal Democrats hold		Swing		

=== Marlborough West ===
Marlborough West (2 seats)
Party	Candidate	Votes	%	±%
Independent	Nicholas Fogg	770		
Conservative	Stewart Dobson	618		
Liberal Democrats	Bryan Derek Castle	364		
Conservative	Stan Radnedge	359		
Independent	Anthony Richard Adrian Sycamore	348		
Liberal Democrats	Richard John Pitts	328		
Majority		254		
Turnout			47.2	
Independent hold		Swing		
Conservative hold		Swing		

=== Milton Lilbourne ===
Milton Lilbourne
Party	Candidate	Votes	%	±%
Conservative	James Leonard Douglas Caldwell	321	56.7	
Independent	John Baxendale Cooke	188	33.2	
UKIP	Leonard Sydney Drew	57	10.1	
Majority		133		
Conservative hold		Swing		

=== Netheravon ===
Netheravon
Party	Candidate	Votes	%	±%
UKIP	Alan Stephen Wood	385	52.5	
Conservative	Ian Charles Duke Blair-Pilling	349	47.5	
Majority		36		
Turnout			49.3	
UKIP hold		Swing		

=== Ogbourne ===
Ogbourne
Party	Candidate	Votes	%	±%
Conservative	David Tudor Bryn Hunter	345	61.9	
Liberal Democrats	Graham Francis	212	38.1	
Majority		133		
Turnout			41.3	
Conservative gain from Independent		Swing		

=== Pewsey ===
Pewsey (2 seats)
Party	Candidate	Votes	%	±%
Independent	Anne Hayhoe	unopposed	n/a	n/a
Conservative	Jerry Kunkler	unopposed	n/a	n/a
Conservative hold		Swing		
Conservative gain from Independent		Swing		

=== Pewsey Vale ===
Pewsey Vale
Party	Candidate	Votes	%	±%
Conservative	Judith Triggs	417	70.2	
Liberal Democrats	David Leighton	177	29.8	
Majority		230		
Turnout			42.3	
Conservative hold		Swing		

=== Potterne ===
Potterne
Party	Candidate	Votes	%	±%
Independent	Clyde Patrick George Hoddinott	316	65.3	
Liberal Democrats	Alan Charles Rankin	168	34.7	
Majority		148		
Turnout			39.2	
Independent hold		Swing		

=== Ramsbury ===
Ramsbury (2 seats)
Party	Candidate	Votes	%	±%
Conservative	Brian John Twigger	771		
Independent	Susan Mary Findlay	756		
UKIP	Frank Baydon Bovingdon	201		
Majority		555		
Turnout			41.5	
Conservative hold		Swing		
Independent hold		Swing		

=== Roundway ===
Roundway (2 seats)
Party	Candidate	Votes	%	±%
Conservative	Geoff Brewer	621		
Conservative	Laura Evelyn Mayes	589		
Liberal Democrats	Katherine Callow	420		
Liberal Democrats	Mark Fell	343		
Labour	Christine Jenkins	135		
Majority		169		
Turnout			36.6	
Conservative gain from Liberal Democrats		Swing		
Conservative gain from Liberal Democrats		Swing		

=== Seend ===
Seend
Party	Candidate	Votes	%	±%
Conservative	Anthony Lake	412	79.8	
UKIP	Bruce Wesley Cotton	104	20.2	
Majority		308		
Turnout			44.4	
Conservative hold		Swing		

=== Shalbourne ===
Shalbourne
Party	Candidate	Votes	%	±%
Conservative	Peter Newton Veasey	449	62.1	
Liberal Democrats	Derek Evans	163	22.5	
UKIP	Lincoln Vincent Williams	111	15.4	
Majority		286		
Turnout			47.2	
Conservative hold		Swing		

=== The Lavingtons ===
The Lavingtons (2 seats)
Party	Candidate	Votes	%	±%
Conservative	Richard Elliott Gamble	550		
Conservative	Jerry Willmott	480		
UKIP	Mike Bridgeman	339		
UKIP	Wendy Watkiss	276		
Labour	Sharon Charity	249		
Majority		141		
Turnout			41.0	
Conservative hold		Swing		
Conservative hold		Swing		

=== Tidworth, Perham Down and Ludgershall South ===
Tidworth, Perham Down & Ludgershall South (3 seats)
Party	Candidate	Votes	%	±%
Conservative	Andrew Robert Connolly	761		
UKIP	Steven Melville Dagger	692		
Conservative	Stephen John Miles	650		
Conservative	Dottie Halfon	359		
Majority		291		
Turnout			23.0	
Conservative hold		Swing		
UKIP gain from Conservative		Swing		
Conservative hold		Swing		

=== Upavon ===
Upavon
Party	Candidate	Votes	%	±%
Conservative	Dominic Campbell	366	60.3	
UKIP	Brian Doherty	140	23.1	
Liberal Democrats	Phyllida Holgate	101	16.6	
Majority		226		
Conservative hold		Swing		

=== Urchfont ===
Urchfont
Party	Candidate	Votes	%	±%
Conservative	Jonathon Seed	415	55.6	
UKIP	Steve Hamilton	331	44.4	
Majority		84		
Turnout			52.4	
Conservative hold		Swing		

=== West Selkley ===
West Selkley
Party	Candidate	Votes	%	±%
Conservative	Gretchen Rawlins	unopposed	n/a	n/a
Conservative hold		Swing		

== See also ==
- Kennet District Council elections
