= 2013 Wiltshire Council election =

English local council election

← 2009	2 May 2013	2017 →

All 98 seats to Wiltshire Council 50 seats needed for a majority
	First party	Second party	Third party
	Con	LD	Ind
Party	Conservative	Liberal Democrats	Independent
Last election	62 seats, 45.3%	24 seats, 31.4%	7 seats, 8.7%
Seats won	58	27	8
Seat change	▼4	▲3	▲1
Popular vote	48,579	23,000	11,990
Percentage	42.8%	20.3%	10.6%
Swing	▼2.5%	▼11.1%	▲1.9%
	Fourth party	Fifth party
	Lab	UKIP
Party	Labour	UKIP
Last election	2 seats, 4.6%	0 seats, 7.0%
Seats won	4	1
Seat change	▲2	▲1
Popular vote	11,525	16,245
Percentage	10.2%	14.3%
Swing	▲5.6%	▲7.3%
- Map showing the composition of Wiltshire Council following the election. Blue showing Conservative, Red showing Labour, Yellow showing Liberal Democrats, Grey showing Independents and Purple showing UKIP.
Council control before election
Conservative
Council control after election
Conservative

Elections to the Wiltshire Council unitary authority took place on 2 May 2013. All ninety-eight seats were up for election, with each councillor being elected in a single-member electoral division, although in six of the divisions only one candidate was nominated and was thus declared the winner without elections taking place.

The previous elections were held in June 2009 and resulted in the Conservatives taking overall control of the newly formed council, the successor to Wiltshire County Council and four recently abolished district councils, with the Liberal Democrats forming the largest of four opposition political groups. At the 2013 election, the Conservatives were the only political party to contest every division. They needed to avoid a net loss of thirteen seats to maintain overall control, while the Liberal Democrats needed a net gain of twenty-six to take control. In the event, the Conservatives gained five seats and lost nine, a net loss of four, retaining control of the council with fifty-eight members. The Liberal Democrats remained the largest other group, with twenty-seven councillors, followed by eight Independents, four from the Labour Party, and one from the UK Independence Party (UKIP), the first time a seat in Wiltshire Council had been won by UKIP.

== Uncontested elections ==
At the close of nominations on 5 April 2013, in six electoral divisions only one candidate had come forward, so these were uncontested: they were Fovant & Chalke Valley (Josephine Green), Ludgershall & Perham (Christopher Williams), the Collingbournes & Netheravon (Charles Howard), Tidworth (Mark Connolly), Warminster West (Pippa Ridout), and Winterslow (Christopher Devine). These six candidates were all Conservatives and were elected unopposed.

== Composition before election ==
Elected in 2009		Before election	
Party	Seats	Party	Seats
Conservative	62	Conservative	61
Liberal Democrats	24	Liberal Democrats	22
Independent	7	Independent	9
Devizes Guardians	3	Devizes Guardians	3
Labour	2	Labour	2
UKIP	0	UKIP	1

== Overall results ==
Wiltshire Council election, 2013
Party	Seats	Gains	Losses	Net gain/loss	Seats %	Votes %	Votes	+/−
Conservative	58	5	9	-4	59.2	42.8	48,581	-18,404
Liberal Democrats	27	7	4	+3	27.6	20.3	23,000	-23,373
UKIP	1	1	0	+1	1	14.7	16,641	+5,895
Independent	8	4	3	+1	8.2	10.2	11,594	-915
Labour	4	2	0	+2	4.1	10.2	11,525	+4,673
Devizes Guardians	0	0	3	-3	0	1.2	1,399	-104
Green	0	0	0	0	0	.6	680	-642

== Results by county divisions ==
=== Aldbourne and Ramsbury ===
Aldbourne and Ramsbury
Party	Candidate	Votes	%	±%
Conservative	James Sheppard	952	63.9	+ 15.2
Independent	Christopher Humphries	538	36.1	– 6.3
Majority		414	27.8	
Turnout			37.3	
Conservative hold		Swing		

=== Alderbury and Whiteparish ===
Alderbury and Whiteparish
Party	Candidate	Votes	%	±%
Conservative	Richard Britton	699	56.6	– 1.7
UKIP	Judith Wykeham	396	32.1	
Labour	Mark Riches	140	11.3	
Majority		303	24.5	
Turnout			36	
Conservative hold		Swing		

=== Amesbury East ===
Amesbury East
Party	Candidate	Votes	%	±%
Conservative	John Noeken	446	44.7	– 5.5
UKIP	Jim Pitt	422	42.3	
Labour	Sharon Jones	130	13	
Majority		24	2.4	
Turnout			23.7	
Conservative hold		Swing		

=== Amesbury West ===
Amesbury West
Party	Candidate	Votes	%	±%
Conservative	Fred Westmoreland	432	36.9	– 9.1
UKIP	John Swindlehurst	379	32.3	+ 12.8
Independent	Andrew Williams	229	19.5	+ 19.5
Labour	Ian Lamberth	132	11.3	+ 11.3
Majority		53	4.5	
Turnout			32.1	
Conservative hold		Swing		

=== Bourne and Woodford Valley ===
Bourne and Woodford Valley
Party	Candidate	Votes	%	±%
Conservative	Mike Hewitt	839	71.9	+ 11.7
Labour	Ronald Champion	328	28.1	+ 22.7
Majority		511	43.8	
Turnout			35	
Conservative hold		Swing		

=== Box and Colerne ===
Box and Colerne
Party	Candidate	Votes	%	±%
Conservative	Sheila Parker	658	43	+ 7.1
Liberal Democrats	Brian Mathew	569	37.2	+ 3.8
Independent	Philip Chamberlain	164	10.7	+ 10.7
Labour	Stephen Wheeler	138	9	+ 5.5
Majority		89	5.8	
Turnout			41.1	
Conservative hold		Swing		

=== Bradford-on-Avon North ===
Bradford-on-Avon North
Party	Candidate	Votes	%	±%
Liberal Democrats	Rosemary Brown	730	46.7	– 12.5
Conservative	Gladys MacRae	316	20.2	– 2.4
UKIP	Benjamin Parker	212	13.6	+ 13.6
Labour	Steve Reckless	171	10.9	+ 6.3
Green	David McQueen	135	8.6	+ 8.6
Majority		414	26.5	
Turnout			41.6	
Liberal Democrats hold		Swing		

=== Bradford-on-Avon South ===
Bradford-on-Avon South
Party	Candidate	Votes	%	±%
Liberal Democrats	Ian Thorn	815	48.5	– 15.5
Conservative	Tom Hall	376	22.4	– 3.8
UKIP	Leonard Drew	258	15.4	+ 15.4
Labour	Rosie Macgregor	231	13.8	+ 11.4
Majority		439	26.1	
Turnout			43.9	
Liberal Democrats hold		Swing		

=== Brinkworth ===
Brinkworth
Party	Candidate	Votes	%	±%
Conservative	Toby Sturgis	834	59.2	– 8.3
UKIP	Barry Telling	294	20.9	+ 20.9
Liberal Democrats	Frances Goldstone	202	14.3	– 11.5
Labour	Ian Wyllie	79	5.6	+ 0.3
Majority		540	38.3	
Turnout			37.9	
Conservative hold		Swing		

=== Bromham, Rowde and Potterne ===
Bromham, Rowde and Potterne
Party	Candidate	Votes	%	±%
Conservative	Liz Bryant	684	55.5	+ 12.3
UKIP	Tony Molland	548	44.5	
Majority		136	11	
Turnout			33.1	
Conservative hold		Swing		

(Note: at a by-election in May 2015 this seat was held by Anna Cuthbert for the Conservatives. For the election result, see Wiltshire Council elections.)

=== Bulford, Allington and Figheldean ===
Bulford, Allington and Figheldean
Party	Candidate	Votes	%	±%
Conservative	John Smale	441	50.3	+ 5.4
Independent	Martin Lee	435	49.7	+ 49.7
Majority		6	.7	
Turnout			24.1	
Conservative hold		Swing		

=== Burbage and the Bedwyns ===
Burbage and the Bedwyns
Party	Candidate	Votes	%	±%
Conservative	Stuart Wheeler	991	82.6	+ 19.8
Labour	Ffinlo Costain	209	17.4	
Majority		782	65.2	
Turnout			31.6	
Conservative hold		Swing		

=== By Brook ===
By Brook
Party	Candidate	Votes	%	±%
Conservative	Jane Scott	820	66	+ 1.9
UKIP	Stuart Eels	264	21.3	
Liberal Democrats	Mary Finch	158	12.7	
Majority		556	44.8	
Turnout			35.6	
Conservative hold		Swing		

=== Calne Central ===
Calne Central
Party	Candidate	Votes	%	±%
Liberal Democrats	Howard Marshall	410	38.1	– 10.8
Conservative	Charles Boase	391	36.4	– 12.4
UKIP	Doran Davies	274	25.5	+ 25.5
Majority		19	1.8	
Turnout			33.1	
Liberal Democrats hold		Swing		

=== Calne Chilvester and Abberd ===
Calne Chilvester and Abberd
Party	Candidate	Votes	%	±%
Conservative	Anthony Trotman	432	46.5	+ 2.7
UKIP	Julia Reid	269	28.9	
Liberal Democrats	Robert MacNaughton	229	24.6	
Majority		163	17.5	
Turnout			26.8	
Conservative hold		Swing		

=== Calne North ===
Calne North
Party	Candidate	Votes	%	±%
Liberal Democrats	Glenis Ansell	319	40	– 0.9
Conservative	David Conway	274	34.3	– 7.4
UKIP	Nigel Gilbert	205	25.7	+ 25.7
Majority		45	5.6	
Turnout			24.4	
Liberal Democrats gain from Conservative		Swing		

=== Calne Rural ===
Calne Rural
Party	Candidate	Votes	%	±%
Conservative	Christine Crisp	670	47.2	+ 2.2
Independent	Richard Broadhead	344	24.3	– 14.4
UKIP	Alastair Muir	277	19.5	+ 19.5
Liberal Democrats	Ross Henning	127	9	−6.6
Majority		326	23	
Turnout			40.8	
Conservative hold		Swing		

=== Calne South and Cherhill ===
Calne South and Cherhill
Party	Candidate	Votes	%	±%
Conservative	Alan Hill	619	46.6	+ 6.6
Liberal Democrats	Susan Tabor	375	28.2	– 15.9
UKIP	Robert Freegard	334	25.2	+ 9.5
Majority		244	18.4	
Turnout			36.2	
Conservative hold		Swing		

=== Chippenham Cepen Park and Derriads ===
Chippenham Cepen Park and Derriads
Party	Candidate	Votes	%	±%
Conservative	Peter Hutton	524	45.7	– 14.7
UKIP	Vince Baseley	344	30	+ 30
Labour	David Barter	171	14.9	+ 7.6
Liberal Democrats	Simon Fisher	107	9.3	– 21.9
Majority		180	15.7	
Turnout			33.4	
Conservative hold		Swing		

=== Chippenham Cepen Park and Redlands ===
Chippenham Cepen Park and Redlands
Party	Candidate	Votes	%	±%
Conservative	Nina Phillips	514	50	– 8.1
UKIP	Allan Massie	236	22.9	+ 22.9
Labour	Maureen Lloyd	177	17.2	+ 4.5
Liberal Democrats	Joshua Howells	102	9.9	– 10.5
Majority		278	27	
Turnout			29.1	
Conservative hold		Swing		

=== Chippenham Hardenhuish ===
Chippenham Hardenhuish
Party	Candidate	Votes	%	±%
Liberal Democrats	Nick Watts	378	30	– 32.3
Independent	Melody Thompson	351	27.8	+ 27.8
Conservative	David Lenderyou	242	19.2	– 13.1
UKIP	Nigel Linacre	205	16.3	+ 16.3
Labour	Harry Thompson	85	6.7	
Majority		27	2.1	
Turnout			37.1	
Liberal Democrats hold		Swing		

(Note: at a by-election in May 2015 this seat was gained by the Conservatives represented by Melody Thompson, who had been the Independent candidate in 2013. For the election result, see Wiltshire Council elections.)

=== Chippenham Hardens and England ===
Chippenham Hardens and England
Party	Candidate	Votes	%	±%
Liberal Democrats	Bill Douglas	368	37.6	– 13.3
UKIP	Leigh Coldwell	262	26.8	+ 26.8
Conservative	Robert Giles	221	22.6	– 16.5
Labour	Jeremy Comerford	127	13	+ 4.9
Majority		106	10.8	
Turnout			30.9	
Liberal Democrats hold		Swing		

=== Chippenham Lowden and Rowden ===
Chippenham Lowden and Rowden
Party	Candidate	Votes	%	±%
Liberal Democrats	Linda Packard	349	32.2	– 7.2
Independent	Sandie Webb	229	21.1	+ 17.1
Conservative	John Phillips	219	20.2	– 11
UKIP	John Clifford	210	19.4	– 0.1
Labour	Nancy Webber	76	7	+ 0.8
Majority		120	11.1	
Turnout			30.3	
Liberal Democrats hold		Swing		

=== Chippenham Monkton ===
Chippenham Monkton
Party	Candidate	Votes	%	±%
Liberal Democrats	Chris Caswill	991	70.3	+ 0.9
Conservative	Bill Winn	174	12.3	– 7.7
UKIP	Henry Collier	164	11.6	+ 4.2
Labour	Benjamin Lawrence	80	5.7	+ 2.5
Majority		817	58	
Turnout			46.4	
Liberal Democrats hold		Swing		

=== Chippenham Pewsham ===
Chippenham Pewsham
Party	Candidate	Votes	%	±%
Liberal Democrats	Mark Packard	515	47.9	– 8.0
Conservative	Teresa Hutton	265	24.6	– 15.3
UKIP	Andrew David Meredith	218	20.3	+ 20.3
Labour	Simon Jones	78	7.2	+ 3.0
Majority		250	23.2	
Turnout			31.4	
Liberal Democrats hold		Swing		

=== Chippenham Queens and Sheldon ===
Chippenham Queens and Sheldon
Party	Candidate	Votes	%	±%
Liberal Democrats	Desna Allen	438	35.2	– 16.7
Conservative	Edward Gillams	404	32.5	– 8.8
UKIP	Jack Hosken	256	20.6	+ 20.6
Labour	Graham Gee	145	11.7	+ 4.9
Majority		34	2.7	
Turnout			37.3	
Liberal Democrats hold		Swing		

=== Corsham Pickwick ===
Corsham Pickwick
Party	Candidate	Votes	%	±%
Conservative	Alan MacRae	424	35.8	
UKIP	Richard Crowder	339	28.7	
Labour	Steve Abbott	259	21.9	
Liberal Democrats	Neil Alan Pocock	161	13.6	
Majority		85	7.2	
Turnout			31	
Conservative hold		Swing		

=== Corsham Town ===
Corsham Town
Party	Candidate	Votes	%	±%
Conservative	Philip Whalle	646	39.7	
Liberal Democrats	Anne Lock	545	33.5	
UKIP	Peter Sparks	318	19.5	
Labour	Mike Perry	118	7.3	
Majority		101	6.2	
Turnout			43.3	
Conservative hold		Swing		

=== Corsham Without and Box Hill ===
Corsham Without and Box Hill
Party	Candidate	Votes	%	±%
Conservative	Dick Tonge	825	56.6	
UKIP	Michael Thomas	267	18.3	
Liberal Democrats	June Yeatman	190	13	
Labour	Hilary Ann Foord	175	12	
Majority		558	38.3	
Turnout			36.3	
Conservative hold		Swing		

=== Cricklade and Latton ===
Cricklade and Latton
Party	Candidate	Votes	%	±%
Liberal Democrats	Bob Jones	917	56.6	
Conservative	Peter Colmer	702	43.4	
Majority		215	13.3	
Turnout			41.6	
Liberal Democrats hold		Swing		

=== Devizes and Roundway South ===
Devizes and Roundway South
Party	Candidate	Votes	%	±%
Conservative	Simon David Jacobs	471	34.2	+ 3.1
Devizes Guardians	Jeff Ody	413	30	– 5.9
Independent	Ian Richard Porter Hopkins	229	16.6	+ 16.6
Labour	Amanda Hopgood	182	13.2	– 1.1
Liberal Democrats	Jasper Selwyn	83	6	– 2.3
Majority		58	4.2	
Turnout			40.7	
Conservative gain from Devizes Guardians		Swing		

=== Devizes East ===
Devizes East
Party	Candidate	Votes	%	±%
Conservative	Peter Evans	436	44.8	+ 14.9
Devizes Guardians	Jane Burton	314	32.3	– 2.0
Labour	Noel Woolrych	223	22.9	+ 10.6
Majority		122	12.5	
Turnout			31.2	
Conservative gain from Devizes Guardians		Swing		

=== Devizes North ===
Devizes North
Party	Candidate	Votes	%	±%
Conservative	Sue Evans	453	41.9	+ 11.4
Devizes Guardians	Nigel Carter	395	36.5	+ 4.9
Labour	Susan Buxton	233	21.6	+ 13.2
Majority		58	5.4	
Turnout			33.2	
Conservative gain from Devizes Guardians		Swing		

=== Downton and Ebble Valley ===
Downton and Ebble Valley
Party	Candidate	Votes	%	±%
Conservative	Julian Paul Johnson	888	62.1	+ 7.6
UKIP	Ray Martin	542	37.9	+ 21.8
Majority		346	24.2	
Turnout			38.4	
Conservative hold		Swing		

=== Durrington and Larkhill ===
Durrington and Larkhill
Party	Candidate	Votes	%	±%
Liberal Democrats	Graham Wright	1,106	78.4	+ 18.9
Conservative	Beth Spencer	304	21.6	– 5.0
Majority		802	56.9	
Turnout			29.6	
Liberal Democrats hold		Swing		

=== Ethandune ===
Ethandune
Party	Candidate	Votes	%	±%
Conservative	Linda Conley	748	60.7	– 0.2
Liberal Democrats	Maurice Flanagan	303	24.6	– 3.7
Labour	Janet Snooks	182	14.8	+ 5.3
Majority		445	36.1	
Turnout			35.7	
Conservative hold		Swing		

(Note: following the death of Linda Conley, a by-election took place on 6 March 2014 and the Ethandune seat was held by Jerry Wickham for the Conservatives. For the election result, see Wiltshire Council elections.)

=== Fovant and Chalke Valley ===
Fovant and Chalke Valley
Party	Candidate	Votes	%	±%
Conservative	Josephine Green	Unopposed	N/A	N/A
Majority		N/A		
Turnout		N/A		
Conservative hold		Swing		

=== Hilperton ===
Hilperton
Party	Candidate	Votes	%	±%
Independent	Ernie Clark	1,329	87.4	+ 10.2
Conservative	Christopher McKell	118	7.8	– 6.0
Labour	Nicholas Harding	74	4.9	+ 4.9
Majority		1,211	79.6	
Turnout			40.8	
Independent hold		Swing		

=== Holt and Staverton ===
Holt and Staverton
Party	Candidate	Votes	%	±%
Liberal Democrats	Trevor William Carbin	529	45.4	
Conservative	Robert Floyd	350	30	
UKIP	Geoffrey Cannell	204	17.5	
Labour	Becky Harrison	82	7	
Majority		179	15.4	
Turnout			33.6	
Liberal Democrats hold		Swing		

=== Kington ===
Kington
Party	Candidate	Votes	%	±%
Conservative	Howard Greenman	953	63.2	
UKIP	John Knight	309	20.5	
Liberal Democrats	Matthew Bragg	247	16.4	
Majority		644	42.7	
Turnout			40.9	
Conservative hold		Swing		

=== Laverstock, Ford and Old Sarum ===
Laverstock, Ford and Old Sarum
Party	Candidate	Votes	%	±%
Labour	Ian McLennan	799	74.5	
Conservative	Robert Price-Powell	274	25.5	
Majority		525	48.9	
Turnout			32.4	
Labour hold		Swing		

=== Ludgershall and Perham Down ===
Ludgershall and Perham Down
Party	Candidate	Votes	%	±%
Conservative	Chris Williams	Unopposed	N/A	N/A
Majority		N/A		
Turnout		N/A		
Conservative hold		Swing		

=== Lyneham ===
Lyneham
Party	Candidate	Votes	%	±%
Conservative	Allison Bucknell	617	59	
UKIP	Roger Luffman	295	28.2	
Liberal Democrats	John Webb	134	12.8	
Majority		322	30.8	
Turnout			33.4	
Conservative hold		Swing		

=== Malmesbury ===
Malmesbury
Party	Candidate	Votes	%	±%
Liberal Democrats	Simon Killane	785	48.2	
Conservative	Ray Sanderson	460	28.2	
UKIP	Bill Blake	254	15.6	
Labour	David Wallington	130	8	
Majority		325	20	
Turnout			39.8	
Liberal Democrats hold		Swing		

=== Marlborough East ===
Marlborough East
Party	Candidate	Votes	%	±%
Conservative	Stewart Dobson	352	32.1	
Independent	Nigel Kerton	323	29.4	
Independent	Peggy Dow	203	18.5	
Liberal Democrats	Susan Knowles	129	11.7	
Labour	Alan Cox	91	8.3	
Majority		29	2.6	
Turnout			33.5	
Conservative gain from Liberal Democrats		Swing		

=== Marlborough West ===
Marlborough West
Party	Candidate	Votes	%	±%
Independent	Nicholas Fogg	674	55.5	
Conservative	Noel Barrett-Morton	468	38.6	
Labour	Pauline Lively	72	5.9	
Majority		206	17	
Turnout			40	
Independent hold		Swing		

=== Melksham Central ===
Melksham Central
Party	Candidate	Votes	%	±%
UKIP	David Pollitt	370	33.5	
Liberal Democrats	Steve Petty	328	29.7	
Conservative	Claire Forgacs	260	23.6	
Labour	Ian Tait	146	13.2	
Majority		42	3.8	
Turnout			29.7	
UKIP gain from Liberal Democrats		Swing		

=== Melksham North ===
Melksham North
Party	Candidate	Votes	%	±%
Liberal Democrats	Pat Aves	354	31.8	
Conservative	Ben Anderson	323	29	
UKIP	Michael Taylor	251	22.5	
Labour	Margaret White	106	9.5	
Independent	Christopher Petty	80	7.2	
Majority		31	2.8	
Turnout			33	
Liberal Democrats gain from Conservative		Swing		

=== Melksham South ===
Melksham South
Party	Candidate	Votes	%	±%
Liberal Democrats	Jon Hubbard	750	50.8	
UKIP	Rod Eaton	411	27.9	
Conservative	Philip Alford	220	14.9	
Labour	Anna Keen	94	6.4	
Majority		339	23	
Turnout			37	
Liberal Democrats hold		Swing		

=== Melksham Without North ===
Melksham Without North
Party	Candidate	Votes	%	±%
Independent	Terry Chivers	634	40.9	
Conservative	Mark Griffiths	411	26.5	
UKIP	Caroline Stephens	391	25.2	
Labour	Julie Lawrence	115	7.4	
Majority		223	14.4	
Turnout			42.4	
Independent gain from Conservative		Swing		

=== Melksham Without South ===
Melksham Without South
Party	Candidate	Votes	%	±%
Conservative	Roy While	478	40.9	
UKIP	Paul Carter	449	38.4	
Liberal Democrats	Terri Welch	142	12.2	
Labour	Sian McLaughlin	99	8.5	
Majority		29	2.5	
Turnout			29.6	
Conservative hold		Swing		

=== Mere ===
Mere
Party	Candidate	Votes	%	±%
Independent	George Jeans	1,464	76.2	
Conservative	Richard Beattie	303	15.8	
UKIP	Patricia Barter	154	8	
Majority		1,161	60.4	
Turnout			54.8	
Independent hold		Swing		

=== Minety ===
Minety
Party	Candidate	Votes	%	±%
Conservative	Chuck Berry	857	52.6	
UKIP	Tim Wadsworth	488	30	
Liberal Democrats	Jenny Stratton	158	9.7	
Labour	Jane Fletcher	125	7.7	
Majority		369	22.7	
Turnout			42.7	
Conservative hold		Swing		

=== Nadder and East Knoyle ===
Nadder and East Knoyle
Party	Candidate	Votes	%	±%
Conservative	Bridget Wayman	831	62.5	
UKIP	Tim Barter	321	24.1	
Labour	John Jordan	178	13.4	
Majority		510	38.3	
Turnout			39.1	
Conservative hold		Swing		

=== Pewsey ===
Pewsey
Party	Candidate	Votes	%	±%
Conservative	Jeremy Kunkler	935	74.1	
Labour	Yvonne Bradbury	326	25.9	
Majority		609	48.3	
Turnout			34.8	
Conservative hold		Swing		

=== Pewsey Vale ===
Pewsey Vale
Party	Candidate	Votes	%	±%
Conservative	Paul Oatway	808	64.4	
Liberal Democrats	Fiona Hornby	280	22.3	
Labour	Fritha Costain	167	13.3	
Majority		528	42.1	
Turnout			34.9	
Conservative hold		Swing		

=== Purton ===
Purton
Party	Candidate	Votes	%	±%
Conservative	Jacqui Lay	705	70.8	
Independent	Geoffrey Greenaway	291	29.2	
Majority		414	41.6	
Turnout			29.3	
Conservative hold		Swing		

=== Redlynch and Landford ===
Redlynch and Landford
Party	Candidate	Votes	%	±%
Conservative	Leo Randall	724	58.6	
UKIP	Ivor Bleaney	322	26.1	
Labour	Lindley Owen	190	15.4	
Majority		402	32.5	
Turnout			33.1	
Conservative hold		Swing		

=== Roundway ===
Roundway
Party	Candidate	Votes	%	±%
Conservative	Laura Mayes	678	63.9	+ 18.9
Devizes Guardians	Andy Geddes	277	26.1	+ 8.5
Labour	James Thorpe	106	10	+ 3.7
Majority		401	37.8	
Turnout			32	
Conservative hold		Swing		

=== Royal Wootton Bassett East ===
Royal Wootton Bassett East
Party	Candidate	Votes	%	±%
Conservative	Mollie Groom	887	73.8	
Liberal Democrats	Stephen Walls	315	26.2	
Majority		572	47.6	
Turnout			33.4	
Conservative hold		Swing		

=== Royal Wootton Bassett North ===
Royal Wootton Bassett North
Party	Candidate	Votes	%	±%
Conservative	Mary Champion	484	46	
Liberal Democrats	Marion Sweet	306	29.1	
UKIP	Rosemary Webb	262	24.9	
Majority		178	16.9	
Turnout			29.2	
Conservative hold		Swing		

=== Royal Wootton Bassett South ===
Royal Wootton Bassett South
Party	Candidate	Votes	%	±%
Liberal Democrats	Christopher Hurst	647	39.7	
Conservative	Peter Doyle	602	36.9	
UKIP	Peter Smith	280	17.2	
Labour	Frederick Price	101	6.2	
Majority		45	2.8	
Turnout			37.9	
Liberal Democrats gain from Conservative		Swing		

=== Salisbury Bemerton ===
Salisbury Bemerton
Party	Candidate	Votes	%	±%
Labour	Richard Rogers	559	57.3	
UKIP	Tony Morland	235	24.1	
Conservative	Laura Mason	181	18.6	
Majority		324	33.2	
Turnout			21.9	
Labour hold		Swing		

=== Salisbury Fisherton and Bemerton Village ===
Salisbury Fisherton and Bemerton Village
Party	Candidate	Votes	%	±%
Labour	John Walsh	388	36.5	
Conservative	Chris Cochrane	387	36.4	
Liberal Democrats	Jo Broom	288	27.1	
Majority		1	.1	
Turnout			32	
Labour gain from Conservative		Swing		

=== Salisbury Harnham ===
Salisbury Harnham
Party	Candidate	Votes	%	±%
Liberal Democrats	Brian Dalton	703	47.8	
Conservative	John McGarry	467	31.8	
UKIP	Anthony Roretz	199	13.5	
Labour	Clare Moody	101	6.9	
Majority		236	16.1	
Turnout			36.9	
Liberal Democrats hold		Swing		

=== Salisbury St Edmund and Milford ===
Salisbury St Edmund and Milford
Party	Candidate	Votes	%	±%
Liberal Democrats	Helena McKeown	526	43	
Conservative	Glen D`Mello	281	23	
Labour	Mark Timbrell	177	14.5	
UKIP	Fiona McWilliam	148	12.1	
Green	Michael Pope	92	7.5	
Majority		245	20	
Turnout			33.6	
Liberal Democrats hold		Swing		

=== Salisbury St Francis and Stratford ===
Salisbury St Francis and Stratford
Party	Candidate	Votes	%	±%
Conservative	Mary Douglas	825	54.1	
Labour	Angela Lawson	306	20.1	
Liberal Democrats	James Robertson	214	14	
Green	Sue Wright	181	11.9	
Majority		519	34	
Turnout			37.5	
Conservative hold		Swing		

=== Salisbury St Marks and Bishopdown ===
Salisbury St Marks and Bishopdown
Party	Candidate	Votes	%	±%
Conservative	Bill Moss	614	57.4	
Labour	Mark Wareham	285	26.6	
Liberal Democrats	Barrie Sinclair-Kemp	171	16	
Majority		329	30.7	
Turnout			31.4	
Conservative hold		Swing		

=== Salisbury St Martins and Cathedral ===
Salisbury St Martins and Cathedral
Party	Candidate	Votes	%	±%
Labour	Ian Tomes	693	41.2	
Conservative	John Brady	524	31.2	
UKIP	Frances Howard	256	15.2	
Liberal Democrats	John Holt	107	6.4	
Green	Ken Black	100	6	
Majority		169	10.1	
Turnout			38.9	
Labour gain from Conservative		Swing		

=== Salisbury St Pauls ===
Salisbury St Pauls
Party	Candidate	Votes	%	±%
Conservative	Richard Clewer	378	33	
Labour	Steven Fear	319	27.8	
Independent	Justin Smith	195	17	
Green	Benji Goehl	172	15	
Liberal Democrats	Robert Steel	83	7.2	
Majority		59	5.1	
Turnout			31.6	
Conservative hold		Swing		

=== Sherston ===
Sherston
Party	Candidate	Votes	%	±%
Conservative	John Thomson	1,037	74.6	
Liberal Democrats	Marc Brown	195	14	
Labour	Peter Baldrey	158	11.4	
Majority		842	60.6	
Turnout			35.6	
Conservative hold		Swing		

=== Southwick ===
Southwick
Party	Candidate	Votes	%	±%
Conservative	Horace Prickett	500	42.9	
Independent	Francis Morland	481	41.3	
Labour	Andrew Hungerford	137	11.8	
Liberal Democrats	Christopher Beaver	47	4	
Majority		19	1.6	
Turnout			33.6	
Conservative hold		Swing		

=== Summerham and Seend ===
Summerham and Seend
Party	Candidate	Votes	%	±%
Conservative	Jonathon Seed	983	68.3	
UKIP	Wendy Taylor	456	31.7	
Majority		527	36.6	
Turnout			43.1	
Conservative hold		Swing		

=== The Collingbournes and Netheravon ===
The Collingbournes and Netheravon
Party	Candidate	Votes	%	±%
Conservative	Charles Howard	Unopposed	N/A	N/A
Majority		N/A		
Turnout		N/A		
Conservative hold		Swing		

=== The Lavingtons and Erlestoke ===
The Lavingtons and Erlestoke
Party	Candidate	Votes	%	±%
Conservative	Richard Gamble	1,004	76.6	
Labour	David Wearn	306	23.4	
Majority		698	53.3	
Turnout			32.5	
Conservative hold		Swing		

=== Tidworth ===
Tidworth
Party	Candidate	Votes	%	±%
Conservative	Mark Connolly	Unopposed	N/A	N/A
Majority		N/A		
Turnout		N/A		
Conservative hold		Swing		

=== Till and Wylye Valley ===
Till and Wylye Valley
Party	Candidate	Votes	%	±%
Liberal Democrats	Ian West	895	55.1	
Conservative	George Murray	645	39.7	
Labour	Annie Rutter	84	5.2	
Majority		250	15.4	
Turnout			45.3	
Liberal Democrats hold		Swing		

=== Tisbury ===
Tisbury
Party	Candidate	Votes	%	±%
Conservative	Tony Deane	724	60.5	
UKIP	Jeremy Hooper	473	39.5	
Majority		251	21	
Turnout			37	
Conservative hold		Swing		

=== Trowbridge Adcroft ===
Trowbridge Adcroft
Party	Candidate	Votes	%	±%
Liberal Democrats	Nicholas Blakemore	497	51.7	
UKIP	Peter Wilson	295	30.7	
Conservative	Karl Hannaford	170	17.7	
Majority		202	21	
Turnout			28.3	
Liberal Democrats gain from Independent		Swing		

=== Trowbridge Central ===
Trowbridge Central
Party	Candidate	Votes	%	±%
Liberal Democrats	John Knight	382	40.8	
UKIP	Jean Wilson	247	26.4	
Conservative	David Halik	167	17.8	
Labour	Shaun Samuel James Henley	140	15	
Majority		135	14.4	
Turnout			25.6	
Liberal Democrats hold		Swing		

=== Trowbridge Drynham ===
Trowbridge Drynham
Party	Candidate	Votes	%	±%
Conservative	Graham Payne	504	72.1	
Liberal Democrats	Clive Blackmore	195	27.9	
Majority		309	44.2	
Turnout			23.5	
Conservative hold		Swing		

=== Trowbridge Grove ===
Trowbridge Grove
Party	Candidate	Votes	%	±%
Independent	Jeff Osborn	842	85.6	
Conservative	Geoffrey Whiffen	142	14.4	
Majority		700	71.1	
Turnout			29.6	
Independent gain from Liberal Democrats		Swing		

=== Trowbridge Lambrok ===
Trowbridge Lambrok
Party	Candidate	Votes	%	±%
Independent	Helen Osborn	662	68.3	
Conservative	Christopher Auckland	307	31.7	
Majority		355	36.6	
Turnout			27	
Independent gain from Liberal Democrats		Swing		

=== Trowbridge Park ===
Trowbridge Park
Party	Candidate	Votes	%	±%
Independent	Dennis Drewett	369	43.1	
Conservative	Peter Fuller	344	40.2	
Liberal Democrats	Andrew Eberlin	143	16.7	
Majority		25	2.9	
Turnout			25.2	
Independent gain from Conservative		Swing		

=== Trowbridge Paxcroft ===
Trowbridge Paxcroft
Party	Candidate	Votes	%	±%
Liberal Democrats	Steve Oldrieve	560	65.6	
Conservative	Derek Coop	294	34.4	
Majority		266	31.1	
Turnout			29.3	
Liberal Democrats hold		Swing		

=== Urchfont and The Cannings ===
Urchfont and The Cannings
Party	Candidate	Votes	%	±%
Conservative	Philip Whitehead	660	49.7	
UKIP	Pat Bryant	445	33.5	
Labour	Colin Robert Hopgood	224	16.9	
Majority		215	16.2	
Turnout			37.1	
Conservative hold		Swing		

=== Warminster Broadway ===
Warminster Broadway
Party	Candidate	Votes	%	±%
Conservative	Keith Humphries	569	54.6	+ 13.7
UKIP	Matthew Brown	473	45.4	+ 27.9
Majority		96	9.2	
Turnout			30.5	
Conservative hold		Swing		

=== Warminster Copheap and Wylye ===
Warminster Copheap and Wylye
Party	Candidate	Votes	%	±%
Conservative	Christopher Newbury	809	71.3	+ 39.5
UKIP	Charlotte Mozley	325	28.7	+ 21.6
Majority		484	42.7	
Turnout			31.4	
Conservative gain from Independent		Swing		

=== Warminster East ===
Warminster East
Party	Candidate	Votes	%	±%
Conservative	Andrew Davis	526	39.6	– 5.1
Independent	Paul MacDonald	451	33.9	+ 14.8
UKIP	Freda Anderson	352	26.5	+ 15.9
Majority		75	5.6	
Turnout			32.2	
Conservative hold		Swing		

=== Warminster West ===
Warminster West
Party	Candidate	Votes	%	±%
Conservative	Pip Ridout	Unopposed	N/A	N/A
Majority		N/A		
Turnout		N/A		
Conservative hold		Swing		

=== Warminster Without ===
Warminster Without
Party	Candidate	Votes	%	±%
Conservative	Fleur de Rhé-Philipe	843	72.4	+ 10.5
UKIP	Andrew Mozley	321	27.6	+ 13.7
Majority		522	44.8	
Turnout			35.9	
Conservative hold		Swing		

=== West Selkley ===
West Selkley
Party	Candidate	Votes	%	±%
Conservative	Jemima Milton	830	77.3	+ 27.3
Labour	Matthew Lee	244	22.7	16.6
Majority		586	54.6	
Turnout			32.1	
Conservative hold		Swing		

=== Westbury East ===
Westbury East
Party	Candidate	Votes	%	±%
Liberal Democrats	Gordon King	486	41.7	+ 13.6
Independent	David Tout	243	20.9	+ 5.3
Independent	Ian Cunningham	241	20.7	+ 5.1
Conservative	Stephen Andrews	195	16.7	– 10.6
Majority		243	20.9	
Turnout			31.8	
Liberal Democrats gain from Independent		Swing		

=== Westbury North ===
Westbury North
Party	Candidate	Votes	%	±%
Liberal Democrats	David Jenkins	493	54.1	+ 6.4
Independent	Sue Ezra	199	21.8	+ 6.6
Conservative	Em Underwood	113	12.4	– 23.2
Labour	Michael Sutton	107	11.7	
Majority		294	32.2	
Turnout			27.3	
Liberal Democrats hold		Swing		

=== Westbury West ===
Westbury West
Party	Candidate	Votes	%	±%
Independent	Russell Hawker	320	38.1	– 10.2
UKIP	Carol Allen	162	19.3	
Labour	Christine Mitchell	127	15.1	+ 5.0
Conservative	Katherine Fryer	110	13.1	– 11.7
Independent	Ian Taylor	74	8.8	+ 8.8
Liberal Democrats	Christine Chilcott	47	5.6	– 9.6
Majority		158	18.8	
Turnout			22	
Independent hold		Swing		

=== Wilton and Lower Wylye Valley ===
Wilton and Lower Wylye Valley
Party	Candidate	Votes	%	±%
Liberal Democrats	Peter Edge	706	57	+ 19
Conservative	Jain Giles	417	33.7	– 5.7
Labour	Anthony Jocelyn	115	9.3	+ 3.6
Majority		289	23.3	
Turnout			33.3	
Liberal Democrats gain from Conservative		Swing		

=== Winsley and Westwood ===
Winsley and Westwood
Party	Candidate	Votes	%	±%
Liberal Democrats	Magnus MacDonald	671	46.1	+ 1.7
Conservative	Martin Newman	599	41.2	– 8.1
Labour	Roger Rowe	185	12.7	+ 6.4
Majority		72	4.9	
Turnout			43.4	
Liberal Democrats gain from Conservative		Swing		

=== Winterslow ===
Winterslow
Party	Candidate	Votes	%	±%
Conservative	Christopher Devine	Unopposed	N/A	N/A
Majority		N/A		
Turnout		N/A		
Conservative hold		Swing		

== By-elections between 2013 and 2017 ==
During 2014 four Liberal Democrats defected from their political group: one to the Conservatives and three to the Independents. In a by-election in May 2015 at Chippenham Hardenhuish, the Conservatives gained a seat from the Liberal Democrats, and in November they gained another at Salisbury St Edmund. At a by-election in May 2016 the Liberal Democrats gained Amesbury East from the Conservatives.

=== Ethandune ===
Ethandune By-Election 6 March 2014
Party	Candidate	Votes	%	±%
Conservative	Jeremy Paul Wickham	480	35.6	
Liberal Democrats	Carolyn Rose King	372	27.6	
UKIP	Roderick Paul Eaton	236	17.5	
Independent	Francis Morland	192	14.2	
Labour	Shaun Samuel James Henley	69	5.1	
Majority		203		
Turnout		1,349	37.3	
Conservative hold		Swing		

=== Bromham, Rowde and Potterne ===
Bromham, Rowde, and Potterne By-Election 7 May 2015
Party	Candidate	Votes	%	±%
Conservative	Anna Louise Cuthbert	1,641	56.7	+ 1.2
UKIP	Paul Robert Carter	519	17.9	– 26.6
Liberal Democrats	Alan Charles Rankin	401	13.8	+ 13.8
Labour	David Wearn	334	11.5	+ 11.5
Majority		1,122		
Turnout		2,916	74.5	
Conservative hold		Swing		

=== Chippenham Hardenhuish ===
Chippenham Hardenhuish By-Election 7 May 2015
Party	Candidate	Votes	%	±%
Conservative	Melody Rhonda Thompson	1,154	47.4	
Liberal Democrats	Michael Kenneth Brough	864	35.5	
Green	Tina Maria Johnston	416	17.1	
Majority		290		
Turnout		2,456	74.3	
Conservative gain from Liberal Democrats		Swing		

=== Salisbury St Edmund and Milford ===
Salisbury St Edmund and Milford By-Election 26 November 2015
Party	Candidate	Votes	%	±%
Conservative	Atiqul Hoque	425	36.7	+13.7
Liberal Democrats	Greg Condliffe	242	20.9	−22.1
Labour	Mark Frank Timbrell	232	20.0	+5.5
Green	Michael Robert Pope	215	18.6	+11.1
Independent	Diana Dallimore	45	3.9	
Majority		290		
Turnout		1,163	31.9	
Conservative gain from Liberal Democrats		Swing		

=== Amesbury East ===
Amesbury East By-Election, 5 May 2016
Party	Candidate	Votes	%	±%
Liberal Democrats	Jamie Paul Capp	361	25.4	
Conservative	Robert Alexander Yuill	356	25.1	
Independent	Andy Derry	292	20.6	
UKIP	Les Webster	217	15.3	
Labour	Steve McAuliffe	133	9.4	
Green	Joshua Baker	60	4.2	
Majority		5		
Turnout		1,421	31.9	
Liberal Democrats gain from Conservative		Swing		

=== Trowbridge Grove ===
Trowbridge Grove By-Election, 14 July 2016
Party	Candidate	Votes	%	±%
Liberal Democrats	Chris Auckland	421	45.9	
Conservative	David Halik	196	21.4	
UKIP	Paul Selby	123	13.4	
Labour	Shaun Henley	77	8.4	
Independent	Guy Wall	74	8.1	
Green	Philip Randle	27	2.9	
Majority		225		
Turnout		919	27.4	
Liberal Democrats gain from Independent		Swing		
