= 2007 North Wiltshire District Council election =

2007 UK local government election

← 2003	3 May 2007

All 54 seats to North Wiltshire District Council 28 seats needed for a majority
	First party	Second party	Third party
	Con	LD	Lab
Party	Conservative	Liberal Democrats	Labour
Last election	25 seats, 45.7%	26 seats, 41.7%	1 seat, 7.8%
Seats won	39	14	1
Seat change	▲14	▼12	Steady
Popular vote	23,404	14,508	2,448
Percentage	53.0%	32.4%	5.5%
Swing	▲7.3%	▼9.3%	▲2.3%
Council control before election
No overall control
Council control after election
Conservative

Elections to North Wiltshire District Council were held on 3 May 2007. The whole council was up for election, and the Conservatives gained overall control, winning thirty-nine of the fifty-four seats available.

This was the last election of district councillors to take place in North Wiltshire. The following year, a government review of local government determined that the four district councils of Wiltshire were to be merged with Wiltshire County Council to form a new unitary authority with effect from 1 April 2009, when North Wiltshire would be abolished and its councillors' term of office would end two years early.

Elections to the new unitary authority, Wiltshire Council, took place in June 2009.

== Election result ==
North Wiltshire District Council elections, 2007
Party	Seats	Gains	Losses	Net gain/loss	Seats %	Votes %	Votes	+/−
Conservative	39			+14	72.2	53.0	23,404	
Liberal Democrats	14			–12	25.9	32.4	14,316	
Labour	1	0	0	0	1.9	5.5	2,448	
UKIP	0	0	0	0	0.0	4.8	2,139	
Independent	0			–1	0.0	2.1	912	
BNP	0	0	0	0	0.0	1.7	769	
English Democrat	0	0	0	0	0.0	0.4	162	

== Electoral division results ==
=== Box and Rudloe ===
Box and Rudloe (2 seats)
Party	Candidate	Votes	%	±%
Conservative	Tudor Jones	725		
Liberal Democrats	Katherine Banks	720		
Conservative	Valerie Richardson	670		
Liberal Democrats	George Gill	605		
UKIP	Richard Crowder	230		
Labour	Steve Wheeler	177		
English Democrat	Harry Barstow	162		
BNP	Michael Simpkins	155		
UKIP	Emma Wright	97		
Majority				
Conservative win (new seat)				
Liberal Democrats win (new seat)				

=== Bremhill ===
Bremhill
Party	Candidate	Votes	%	±%
Conservative	Christine Crisp	688	77.9	
Liberal Democrats	Michael Burns	195	22.1	
Majority		493		
Conservative hold		Swing		

=== Brinkworth ===
Brinkworth (2 seats)
Party	Candidate	Votes	%	±%
Conservative	Toby Sturgis	1,168		
Conservative	Vivian Vines	1,161		
Liberal Democrats	Catherine Doody	406		
Liberal Democrats	Jackie Morris	395		
Labour	Valerie Price	105		
Majority				
Conservative win (new seat)				
Conservative win (new seat)				

=== Calne Abberd ===
Calne Abberd
Party	Candidate	Votes	%	±%
Liberal Democrats	Ross Henning	279	39.9	
Conservative	Roy Golding	224	32.0	
UKIP	Julia Reid	105	15.0	
BNP	Robert Baggs	91	13.0	
Majority		55		
Liberal Democrats hold		Swing		

=== Calne Chilvester ===
Calne Chilvester
Party	Candidate	Votes	%	±%
Conservative	Tony Trotman	356	57.4	
Liberal Democrats	Heather Canfer	176	28.4	
UKIP	Andy Ireland	88	14.2	
Majority		180		
Conservative hold		Swing		

=== Calne Lickhill ===
Calne Lickhill (2 seats)
Party	Candidate	Votes	%	±%
Conservative	Caroline Ramsey	392		
Conservative	Andrea Pier	390		
UKIP	John Ireland	335		
UKIP	Ellie Bland	328		
Liberal Democrats	Peter Dolman	275		
Liberal Democrats	Tom Briggs	231		
Majority				
Conservative hold		Swing		
Conservative win (new seat)				

=== Calne Marden ===
Calne Marden
Party	Candidate	Votes	%	±%
Conservative	Alan Hill	453	51.7	
Liberal Democrats	Paul Venton	276	31.5	
UKIP	David Short	147	16.8	
Majority		177		
Conservative gain from Liberal Democrats		Swing		

=== Calne Priestley ===
Calne Priestley
Party	Candidate	Votes	%	±%
Conservative	Charles Boase	351	53.5	
UKIP	Dave Bland	305	46.5	
Majority		46		
Conservative gain from Liberal Democrats		Swing		

=== Calne Quemerford ===
Calne Quemerford
Party	Candidate	Votes	%	±%
Conservative	Helen Plenty	437	51.9	
Liberal Democrats	Howard Marshall	239	28.4	
UKIP	Dianne Moore	166	19.7	
Majority		198		
Conservative hold		Swing		

=== Calne Without ===
Calne Without
Party	Candidate	Votes	%	±%
Conservative	Shauna Bodman	609	66.3	
Liberal Democrats	David Evans	310	33.7	
Majority		299		
Conservative hold		Swing		

=== Chippenham Allington ===
Chippenham Allington (2 seats)
Party	Candidate	Votes	%	±%
Conservative	Peter Hutton	791		
Conservative	Martin Singlehurst	735		
Liberal Democrats	Judy Rooke	642		
Liberal Democrats	Sylvia Gibson	618		
Labour	Hilary Foord	125		
Majority				
Conservative gain from Liberal Democrats		Swing		
Conservative win (new seat)				

=== Chippenham Avon ===
Chippenham Avon (2 seats)
Party	Candidate	Votes	%	±%
Liberal Democrats	Ronald MacGregor	677		
Liberal Democrats	Jeremy Hall	669		
Conservative	Harry Purdon	426		
Conservative	Julian Sturgis	363		
Majority				
Liberal Democrats win (new seat)				
Liberal Democrats win (new seat)				

=== Chippenham Hill Rise ===
Chippenham Hill Rise
Party	Candidate	Votes	%	±%
Liberal Democrats	Paul Darby	476	66.6	
Conservative	Peter Green	187	26.2	
Labour	Clare Davison	52	7.3	
Majority		289		
Liberal Democrats hold		Swing		

=== Chippenham London Road ===
Chippenham London Road
Party	Candidate	Votes	%	±%
Liberal Democrats	John Scragg	226	35.2	
Conservative	Andy Whitaker	190	29.6	
UKIP	Andrew Meredith	157	24.5	
Labour	Julie Lawrence	69	10.7	
Majority		36		
Liberal Democrats hold		Swing		

=== Chippenham Monkton Park ===
Chippenham Monkton Park
Party	Candidate	Votes	%	±%
Liberal Democrats	Christopher Caswill	523	55.5	
Conservative	Brendan McCarron	365	38.7	
Labour	Benjamin Lawrence	55	5.8	
Majority		158		
Liberal Democrats gain from Independent		Swing		

=== Chippenham Park ===
Chippenham Park (2 seats)
Party	Candidate	Votes	%	±%
Liberal Democrats	Patrick Coleman	815		
Liberal Democrats	Jules Whincup	810		
Conservative	Elizabeth Kennedy	761		
Conservative	Ken Kennedy	714		
Majority				
Liberal Democrats hold		Swing		
Liberal Democrats win (new seat)				

=== Chippenham Pewsham ===
Chippenham Pewsham (2 seats)
Party	Candidate	Votes	%	±%
Liberal Democrats	Sylvia Doubell	841		
Liberal Democrats	John Doubell	781		
Conservative	Vince Baseley	729		
Conservative	Phil Pye	721		
Majority				
Liberal Democrats hold		Swing		
Liberal Democrats gain from Conservative		Swing		

=== Chippenham Redland ===
Chippenham Redland (2 seats)
Party	Candidate	Votes	%	±%
Conservative	Nina Phillips	745		
Conservative	Andy Phillips	546		
Labour	Maureen Lloyd	380		
Liberal Democrats	William Douglas	328		
UKIP	John Frampton	179		
Majority				
Conservative hold		Swing		
Conservative win (new seat)				

=== Chippenham Westcroft/Queens ===
Chippenham Westcroft/Queens
Party	Candidate	Votes	%	±%
Liberal Democrats	Desna Allen	369	50.5	
Conservative	Stephen Cadby	276	37.8	
Labour	John Weems	85	11.6	
Majority		93		
Liberal Democrats hold		Swing		

=== Colerne ===
Colerne
Party	Candidate	Votes	%	±%
Liberal Democrats	Simon Meadowcroft	480	52.9	
Conservative	Helen Wright	428	47.1	
Majority		52		
Liberal Democrats hold		Swing		

=== Corsham and Lacock ===
Corsham and Lacock (3 seats)
Party	Candidate	Votes	%	±%
Conservative	Dick Tonge	1,699		
Conservative	Jennie Hartless	1,507		
Conservative	Sheila Parker	1,421		
Liberal Democrats	Linda Packard	1,100		
Liberal Democrats	Mark Packard	1,055		
Labour	Judith Hible	556		
BNP	Christopher Deacon	342		
Majority				
Conservative win (new seat)				
Conservative win (new seat)				
Conservative win (new seat)				

=== Cricklade ===
Cricklade (2 seats)
Party	Candidate	Votes	%	±%
Conservative	Tony Clements	896		
Liberal Democrats	Michael Hatton	740		
Conservative	Owen Gibbs	700		
Liberal Democrats	Anthony Nelmes	588		
Labour	Frederick Price	116		
Majority				
Conservative gain from Liberal Democrats		Swing		
Liberal Democrats hold		Swing		

=== Hullavington and Crudwell ===
Hullavington and Crudwell
Party	Candidate	Votes	%	±%
Conservative	Howard Greenman	834	81.8	
Liberal Democrats	Muriel Chivers	186	18.2	
Majority		648		
Conservative win (new seat)				

=== Kington Langley ===
Kington Langley
Party	Candidate	Votes	%	±%
Conservative	Sherry Meadows	620	63.8	
Independent	Philip Allnatt	352	36.2	
Majority		268		
Conservative hold		Swing		

=== The Lydiards and Broad Town ===
The Lydiards and Broad Town
Party	Candidate	Votes	%	±%
Conservative	Mollie Groom	802	80.1	
Liberal Democrats	Keith Dixon	199	19.9	
Majority		603		
Conservative hold		Swing		

=== Lyneham ===
Lyneham (2 seats)
Party	Candidate	Votes	%	±%
Conservative	Allison Bucknell	1,005		
Conservative	Sarah Still	871		
Liberal Democrats	John Webb	477		
Liberal Democrats	Duncan Rowley	381		
Independent	John Williams	248		
Majority				
Conservative hold		Swing		
Conservative gain from Liberal Democrats		Swing		

=== Malmesbury ===
Malmesbury (2 seats)
Party	Candidate	Votes	%	±%
Conservative	Ray Sanderson	758		
Conservative	Rachel Cinnamond	661		
Liberal Democrats	Judy Jones	493		
Liberal Democrats	Patrick Goldstone	458		
Labour	Jason Hughes	173		
Majority				
Conservative gain from Liberal Democrats		Swing		
Conservative gain from Liberal Democrats		Swing		

=== Minety and Purton ===
Minety and Purton (3 seats)
Party	Candidate	Votes	%	±%
Conservative	Geoffrey Greenaway	1,459		
Conservative	Jacqui Lay	1,407		
Conservative	Chuck Berry	1,390		
Liberal Democrats	Helen Dixon	743		
Liberal Democrats	Russell Dabson	647		
Liberal Democrats	John Cooper	567		
UKIP	John Papworth	180		
UKIP	Gillian Bristow	175		
Labour	Pauline Smith	161		
Majority				
Conservative win (new seat)				
Conservative win (new seat)				
Conservative win (new seat)				

=== Pickwick ===
Pickwick (2 seats)
Party	Candidate	Votes	%	±%
Conservative	Elaine Marston	487		
Labour	Christine Reid	478		
Liberal Democrats	Julian Mittra	367		
Conservative	Rod Taylor	365		
Labour	Christopher Lynch	315		
BNP	Michael Howson	181		
Majority				
Conservative gain from Liberal Democrats		Swing		
Labour hold		Swing		

=== St Paul Malmesbury Without ===
St Paul Malmesbury Without
Party	Candidate	Votes	%	±%
Conservative	Ian Henderson	446	63.1	
Liberal Democrats	Ian Ashby	261	36.9	
Majority		185		
Conservative win (new seat)				

=== Sherston ===
Sherston
Party	Candidate	Votes	%	±%
Conservative	John Thomson	741	78.5	
Liberal Democrats	Peter Lawrence	133	14.1	
Labour	Valerie Bannister	70	7.4	
Majority		608		
Conservative win (new seat)				

=== Sutton Benger ===
Sutton Benger
Party	Candidate	Votes	%	±%
Conservative	Bob Causer	446	51.8	
Independent	Peter Bailey	312	36.2	
Liberal Democrats	Matthew Bragg	103	12.0	
Majority		134		
Conservative win (new seat)				

=== Wootton Bassett North ===
Wootton Bassett North (2 seats)
Party	Candidate	Votes	%	±%
Conservative	Bill Roberts	809		
Conservative	Audrey Wannell	763		
Liberal Democrats	Jenny Stratton	504		
Liberal Democrats	Stephen Walls	464		
Labour	Arnold Shaw	109		
Majority				
Conservative gain from Liberal Democrats		Swing		
Conservative gain from Liberal Democrats		Swing		

=== Wootton Bassett South ===
Wootton Bassett South (3 seats)
Party	Candidate	Votes	%	±%
Conservative	Chris Wannell	1,408		
Conservative	Pete Roberts	1,389		
Conservative	Peter Doyle	1,336		
Liberal Democrats	Jerry Potter	556		
Liberal Democrats	Olivia Thomas	555		
Liberal Democrats	Carole Tan	547		
UKIP	Alan Martin	247		
UKIP	Mary Fisher-Edmonds	227		
Labour	Ellis Webb	215		
Majority				
Conservative hold		Swing		
Conservative hold		Swing		
Conservative gain from Liberal Democrats		Swing		

=== Yatton Keynell ===
Yatton Keynell
Party	Candidate	Votes	%	±%
Conservative	Jane Scott	693	77.5	
Liberal Democrats	Catherine Messenger	201	22.5	
Majority		492		
Conservative win (new seat)				

== See also ==
- North Wiltshire District Council elections
