= Wiltshire Council elections =

Local government elections in Wiltshire, England

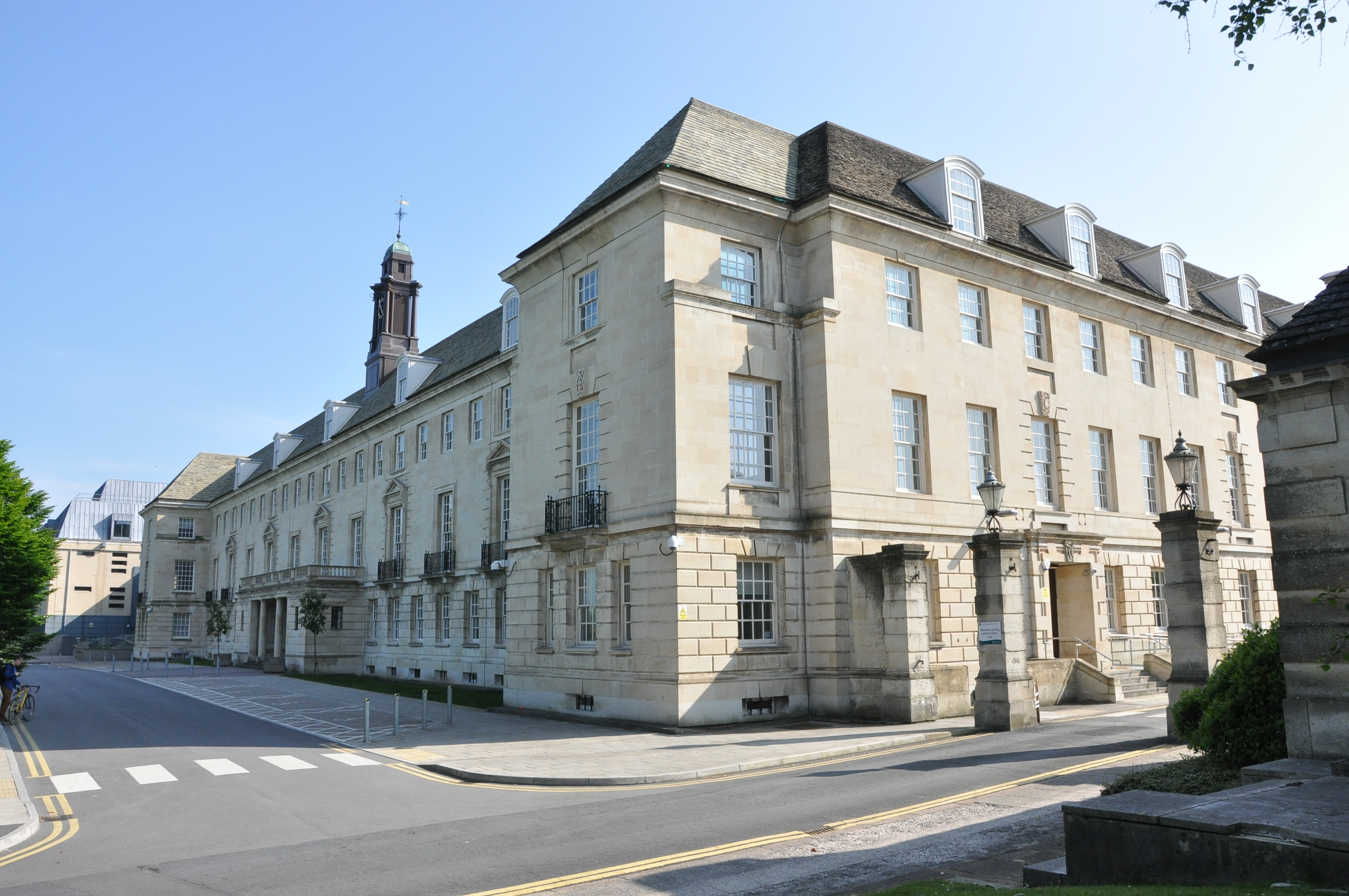
County Hall in Trowbridge, headquarters of Wiltshire Council

Wiltshire Council elections date from 2009, when the Wiltshire Council unitary authority was created.

As a result of the 2009 structural changes to local government in England, the former Wiltshire County Council and the four districts within its geographical area were replaced by Wiltshire Council, a unitary authority covering the same area, with elections continuing to be held every four years. A shadow authority was in place from 2008 and the first elections were held on 4 June 2009, when they coincided with an election to the European Parliament. Previously, Wiltshire County Council had been elected between 1889 and 2005, initially every three years, later every four years.

The unitary authority area has 98 electoral divisions, each electing one councillor. In 2018, the Local Government Boundary Commission for England began the first review of the divisions, on the grounds that in two of them the number of electors deviated from the average by more than 30%. Following consultations, their proposal, enacted by Parliament in March 2020 as the Wiltshire (Electoral Changes) Order 2020 and coming into effect at the 2021 elections, kept the total at 98 but redrew boundaries and renamed divisions in several areas.

== Political control ==
Since the first election to the council in 2009, political control of the council has been held by the following parties:

Party in control	Years
Conservative	2009–2025
No overall control	2025–

=== Council composition ===
Composition of the council
Year	Conservative	Liberal Democrats (Note: Includes totals for the predecessors of the Liberal Democrats, the Liberal Party and SDP (both of which participated in the Alliance).)	Labour	Reform UK	Independents & Others	Council control after election
Council established by the merger of Kennet, North Wiltshire, Salisbury and West Wiltshire (98 seats)
2009	62	24	2	–	10 (Note: 7 Independents, 3 Devizes Guardians)	Conservative
2013	58	27	4	–	9 (Note: 8 Independents, 1 UKIP)	Conservative
2017	68	20	3	–	7	Conservative
New ward boundaries (98 seats)
2021	61	27	3	0	7	Conservative
2025	37	43	1	10	7	No overall control

=== Leadership ===
The leaders of the council since the council's creation in 2009 have been:

Councillor	Party	From	To
Jane Scott	Conservative	1 Apr 2009	9 Jul 2019
Phillip Whitehead	Conservative	9 Jul 2019	18 May 2021
Richard Clewer	Conservative	18 May 2021	20 May 2025
Ian Thorn	Liberal Democrats	20 May 2025	

Jane Scott had been the last leader of the predecessor Wiltshire County Council.

== Council elections ==
- 2009 Wiltshire Council election
- 2013 Wiltshire Council election
- 2017 Wiltshire Council election
- 2021 Wiltshire Council election (new ward boundaries)
- 2025 Wiltshire Council election

== County result maps ==
2009 results map

2013 results map

2017 results map

2021 results map

2025 results map

== By-election results ==
By-elections occur when seats become vacant between council elections. Below is a summary of all by-elections; full by-election results can be found by clicking on the by-election name.

By-election	Date	Incumbent party	Winning party
Southwick by-election	3 September 2009	Conservative	Independent
Bromham, Rowde and Potterne by-election	21 December 2010	Conservative	Conservative
Ethandune by-election	6 March 2014	Conservative	Conservative
Bromham, Rowde and Potterne by-election	7 May 2015	Conservative	Conservative
Chippenham Hardenhuish by-election	7 May 2015	Liberal Democrats	Conservative
Salisbury St Edmund and Milford by-election	26 November 2015	Liberal Democrats	Conservative
Amesbury East by-election	5 May 2016	Conservative	Liberal Democrats
Trowbridge Grove by-election	14 July 2016	Independent	Liberal Democrats
Trowbridge Drynham by-election	4 July 2019	Conservative	Liberal Democrats
Westbury North by-election	18 July 2019	Liberal Democrats	Liberal Democrats
Ethandune by-election	19 September 2019	Conservative	Conservative
Melksham Without South by-election	24 October 2019	Conservative	Conservative
Trowbridge Lambrok by-election	28 November 2019	Conservative	Liberal Democrats
Till and Wylye Valley by-election	2 March 2020	Conservative	Conservative
Salisbury St Paul's by-election	3 November 2022	Conservative	Liberal Democrats
Tisbury by-election	8 June 2023	Liberal Democrats	Liberal Democrats
Calne Chilvester and Abberd by-election	22 February 2024	Conservative	Liberal Democrats
Cricklade and Latton by-election	14 March 2024	Liberal Democrats	Liberal Democrats
Salisbury Milford by-election	15 October 2026	Liberal Democrats	Liberal Democrats

== See also ==
- List of electoral divisions and wards in Wiltshire
- Wiltshire County Council elections
