= Kennet District Council elections =

Local government elections in Wiltshire, England

Kennet was a non-metropolitan district in Wiltshire, England. It was abolished on 1 April 2009 and replaced by Wiltshire Council.

== Political control ==
From the first election to the council in 1973 until its abolition in 2009, political control of the council was held by the following parties:

Party in control	Years
Independent	1973–1987
No overall control	1987–2000
Conservative	2000–2009

Political group	Councillors									
Political group	1973	1976	1979	1983	1987	1991	1995	1999	2003	2007
Conservatives	5	9	6	9	15	17	9	20	27	33
Labour	0	2	1	0	0	1	9	4	1	0
Liberal Democrats						8	8	4	3	1
Liberal Party	0	2	3	4	9					
Devizes Guardians									3	2
UKIP							0	0	1	2
Independent Conservative			1							
Independent	32	27	29	27	16	13	14	12	8	5
Total	37	40	40	40	40	40	40	40	43	43

=== Leadership ===
The leaders of the council from 2001 until the council's abolition in 2009 were:

Councillor	Party	From	To
Chris Humphries	Conservative	2001	May 2007
Lionel Grundy	Conservative	15 May 2007	31 Mar 2009

== Council elections ==
- 1973 Kennet District Council election
- 1976 Kennet District Council election (New ward boundaries)
- 1979 Kennet District Council election
- 1983 Kennet District Council election
- 1987 Kennet District Council election
- 1991 Kennet District Council election (District boundary changes took place but the number of seats remained the same)
- 1995 Kennet District Council election (District boundary changes took place but the number of seats remained the same)
- 1999 Kennet District Council election
- 2003 Kennet District Council election (New ward boundaries)
- 2007 Kennet District Council election

== Results maps ==
2003 results map

2007 results map

== By-election results ==
=== 1999-2003 ===
Urchfont By-Election 17 February 2000
Party	Candidate	Votes	%	±%
Conservative		390	71.0	+71.0
Liberal Democrats		145	26.4	−12.7
Labour		14	2.6	−9.4
Majority		245	44.6	
Turnout		549	55.6	
Conservative gain from Independent		Swing		

Seend By-Election 2 March 2000
Party	Candidate	Votes	%	±%
Liberal Democrats		369	50.8	+7.9
Conservative		331	45.5	+45.5
Labour		27	3.7	−18.5
Majority		38	5.3	
Turnout		727	35.0	
Liberal Democrats gain from Independent		Swing		

West Selkley By-Election 6 April 2000
Party	Candidate	Votes	%	±%
Conservative		222	45.5	+12.2
Liberal Democrats		189	38.7	+1.2
Labour		77	15.7	−13.4
Majority		33	6.8	
Turnout		488	37.8	
Conservative gain from Liberal Democrats		Swing		

Devizes East By-Election 18 July 2002
Party	Candidate	Votes	%	±%
Devizes Guardians	Tony Duck	332	37.3	+37.3
Labour	Colin Hopgood	193	21.7	−22.0
Conservative	Roy Parsons	186	20.9	−18.0
Liberal Democrats	Angelika Davey	155	17.4	+0.1
UKIP	Alex Duffey	24	2.7	+2.7
Majority		139	15.6	
Turnout		890	22.4	
Devizes Guardians gain from Independent		Swing		

=== 2003-2007 ===
Ogbourne By-Election 28 October 2004
Party	Candidate	Votes	%	±%
Conservative	David Hunter	250	60.0	+60.0
Liberal Democrats	Debra Davis	147	35.3	−2.9
Labour	Frank Jeffrey	20	4.8	+4.8
Majority		103	24.7	
Turnout		417	21.9	
Conservative gain from Independent		Swing		

=== 2007-2009 ===
Upavon By-Election 31 January 2008
Party	Candidate	Votes	%	±%
Conservative	Judy D'Arcy-Irvine	218	45.8	−14.5
UKIP	Mike Bridgeman	106	22.3	−0.8
Liberal Democrats	Fiona Hornby	87	18.3	+1.7
Labour	Gary Gordon	38	8.0	+8.0
Green	Nicholas Stedman	27	5.7	+5.7
Majority		112	23.5	
Turnout		476	31.4	
Conservative hold		Swing		
