= North Wiltshire District Council elections =

Local government elections in Wiltshire, England

North Wiltshire was a non-metropolitan district in Wiltshire, England. It was abolished on 1 April 2009 and replaced by Wiltshire Council.

== Political control ==
From the first election to the council in 1973 until its abolition in 2009, political control of the council was held by the following parties:

Party in control	Years
No overall control	1973–1976
Conservative	1976–1991
Liberal Democrats	1991–1999
No overall control	1999–2007
Conservative	2007–2009

=== Leadership ===
The leaders of the council from 2003 until the council's abolition in 2009 were:

Councillor	Party	From	To
Ruth Coleman	Liberal Democrats	2003	May 2005
Carol O'Gorman	Liberal Democrats	May 2005	May 2007
Dick Tonge	Conservative	16 May 2007	31 Mar 2009

== Council elections ==
- 1973 North Wiltshire District Council election
- 1976 North Wiltshire District Council election
- 1979 North Wiltshire District Council election
- 1983 North Wiltshire District Council election (New ward boundaries, district boundary changes)
- 1987 North Wiltshire District Council election
- 1991 North Wiltshire District Council election, (District boundary changes took place but the number of seats remained the same)
- 1995 North Wiltshire District Council election
- 1999 North Wiltshire District Council election
- 2003 North Wiltshire District Council election (New ward boundaries)
- 2007 North Wiltshire District Council election (New ward boundaries)

== Results maps ==
2003 results map

== By-election results ==
=== 1995-1999 ===
The Lydiards By-Election 3 July 1997
Party	Candidate	Votes	%	±%
Liberal Democrats		466	64.1	+24.9
Conservative		261	35.9	+4.3
Majority		205	28.2	
Turnout		727	49.0	
Liberal Democrats hold		Swing		

Colerne By-Election 19 February 1998
Party	Candidate	Votes	%	±%
Liberal Democrats		453	58.3	−2.6
Conservative		278	35.8	+8.9
Labour		40	5.1	−7.1
UKIP		6	0.8	+0.8
Majority		175	22.5	
Turnout		777	41.0	
Liberal Democrats hold		Swing		

=== 1999-2003 ===
Purton By-Election 8 February 2001
Party	Candidate	Votes	%	±%
Liberal Democrats	Helen Dixon	662	57.1	+2.0
Conservative		498	42.9	+8.3
Majority		164	14.2	
Turnout		1,160	37.0	
Liberal Democrats hold		Swing		

Crudwell By-Election 7 June 2001
Party	Candidate	Votes	%	±%
Conservative	Margaret Phillips	342	45.7	−39.1
Independent	Roger Wilson	277	37.0	+37.0
Liberal Democrats	Ann Davis	91	12.2	+0.5
Labour	Valerie Price	39	5.2	+1.7
Majority		65	8.7	
Turnout		749		
Conservative hold		Swing		

Calne North East By-Election 7 March 2002
Party	Candidate	Votes	%	±%
Liberal Democrats	Eric Porter	253	54.8	+33.2
Conservative	Philippa Penny	209	45.2	+1.3
Majority		44	9.6	
Turnout		462	26.9	
Liberal Democrats gain from Conservative		Swing		

St Paul Malmesbury Without By-Election 7 March 2002
Party	Candidate	Votes	%	±%
Conservative	Ian Henderson	432	49.3	−0.1
Liberal Democrats	Ann Davis	306	34.9	−1.8
Labour	Daphne Jones	111	12.7	−1.2
Green	Sheila Veitch	27	3.1	+3.1
Majority		126	14.4	
Turnout		876	40.6	
Conservative hold		Swing		

=== 2003-2007 ===
Lyneham & Bradenstoke By-Election 25 August 2005
Party	Candidate	Votes	%	±%
Conservative	James Elford	539	50.0	−3.4
Liberal Democrats	John Webb	538	49.9	+3.3
Majority		1	0.1	
Turnout		1,077	29.5	
Conservative gain from Liberal Democrats		Swing		

Nettleton By-Election 24 November 2005
Party	Candidate	Votes	%	±%
Conservative	Sherryn Meadows	322	50.4	−25.9
Liberal Democrats	Mark Packard	317	49.6	+25.9
Majority		5	0.8	
Turnout		639	33.2	
Conservative hold		Swing		

Lyneham By-Election 23 February 2006
Party	Candidate	Votes	%	±%
Liberal Democrats	John Webb	654	52.1	+5.5
Conservative	Sarah Still	602	47.9	−5.5
Majority		52	4.2	
Turnout		1,256	35.0	
Liberal Democrats gain from Conservative		Swing		

Colerne By-Election 13 July 2006
Party	Candidate	Votes	%	±%
Liberal Democrats	Simon Meadowcroft	425	51.6	−8.8
Conservative	Helen Wright	399	48.4	+15.2
Majority		26	3.2	
Turnout		824	42.8	
Liberal Democrats hold		Swing		
