= Nigel Carter =

English politician (born 1945)

Nigel Denys Carter CEnv FEI MIEMA (born April 1945) is an English Chartered Environmentalist, politician, member of the Devizes Guardians party since 2002, and a former member of Devizes Town Council. He has also served as a Kennet District Councillor and was a Wiltshire Councillor from 2009 to 2013. His first career was as a naval officer.

== Career ==
Born in Marlborough, Wiltshire, Carter was educated at the Britannia Royal Naval College and from there was commissioned into the Royal Navy. He served as a naval officer from 1963 to 1970, receiving his wings as a fixed-wing aircraft pilot and qualifying in gunnery. He served in the aircraft carrier HMS Victorious, the Leander-class frigate HMS Minerva, the minesweeper HMS Dufton, and the shore establishment HMS Excellent on Whale Island. On 1 May 1968, he was promoted to lieutenant. In 1970, he was discharged from the Navy on medical grounds.

After returning to civilian life, Carter worked for BP between 1970 and 1992, as a general manager in the Shetland Islands and Africa in the areas of exploration, production, trading, marketing, and distribution. From 1993 he was Principal Advisor to En Venture, an environmental consultancy, working as a management consultant on sustainable development for industry in the Caribbean, the Pacific Rim, and Europe, including the Balkans. His experience includes capacity building in the European Union and greenhouse gases, as well as the environmental management system.

In 1986, he received a Certified Diploma in Finance and Accounting from the City Polytechnic, London, and in 2007 Oxford Brookes University awarded him a Certificate in Strategic Environmental Assessment.

From 1997, Carter was a member of the United Kingdom's delegation Technical Committee 207 (TC207) on Environmental Management of the International Organization for Standardization (ISO). He has been responsible for drafting three ISO standards, ISO 14015 (2001), ISO 19011 (2002), and ISO 14064 (2006). The first is a standard on environmental management and environmental assessment of sites and organizations, the second provides guidelines for quality and environmental management systems auditing, and the third a specification with guidance at the organization level for quantification and reporting of greenhouse gas emissions and removals.

He is a fellow of the Energy Institute, a professional body, and was a member of the Institute of Environmental Management and Assessment until 2021.

== Political life ==
By 2001, Carter was living in Devizes, Wiltshire, and in that year a new local political party called the Devizes Guardians began to be formed, in the aftermath of the felling of five trees in the Devizes Market Place, where Carter's office then was. The party registered with the Electoral Commission on 19 June 2002. In its registration, it named Carter as its leader and chairman.

On 1 May 2003, Carter was elected to Kennet District Council as a Devizes Guardian, for the Devizes North ward, commenting "We have to acknowledge there is an element of protest vote in the support we have had. The question of the future of the hospital has been paramount in the issues expressed by the people we have talked to, with transport coming a close second." In May 2007 he lost the seat to a Conservative.

The District of Kennet was abolished in April 2009, as part the changes to local government in England, and replaced by a new Wiltshire Council unitary authority. In the first elections to the new authority, on 4 June 2009, Carter was elected as a member for Devizes North. He is also a school governor and a member of the Devizes Development Partnership.

On Wiltshire Council, the Devizes Guardians held three seats from 2009 to 2013, and these members formed a political group with Carter as leader. They lost all these seats at the local elections of May 2013. Carter retired as a councillor in May 2021 and from consultancy in 2020.

== See also ==
Wiltshire Council's banner

- 2009 Wiltshire Council election
- 2013 Wiltshire Council election
- 2017 Wiltshire Council election
