= Devizes Guardians =

- Leader: Jonathan Hunter
- Founded: 2001
- Headquarters: Devizes
- Ideology: Localism; Conservation
- Devizes Town Council: 13 / 20

Website
- www.facebook.com/DevizesGuardians

The Devizes Guardians are a local independent political party based in Devizes, Wiltshire, England. The party was formed in 2001 and has won seats on Kennet District Council and Wiltshire Council.

Since 2013, the party has focused its efforts on Devizes Town Council, taking an independent and non-partisan approach to local issues and steering clear of national party politics. Devizes Guardians currently hold the majority on the town council.

The registered emblems of the party represent a tree, and it has been called the "local conservation party".

== History ==
The Devizes Guardians were formed in 2001, in the aftermath of the felling of five London plane trees in the Devizes Market Place, and on 19 June 2002 the new party was registered with the Electoral Commission under the Registration of Political Parties Act 1998. On 18 July 2002 the Devizes Guardians contested and won a Kennet District Council by-election in the Devizes East ward, the successful candidate being Tony Duck, who commented "I think there is a movement for more grass roots representation, free from the shackles of party politics and hopefully enabling us to challenge local issues."

At the Kennet district elections in May 2003, the party contested three seats, all in Devizes, and won all three, its successful candidates being Nigel Carter (Devizes North), Jeffrey Ody (Devizes South), and Tony Duck (Devizes East). Carter commented to a Wiltshire newspaper "We have to acknowledge there is an element of protest vote in the support we have had. The question of the future of the hospital has been paramount in the issues expressed by the people we have talked to, with transport coming a close second."

At the May 2005 county council elections, the party contested two divisions of Wiltshire County Council, Devizes North and Devizes South, its candidates being Carter and Ody, but was unsuccessful in both.

In the Kennet District Council elections of May 2007, the Guardians won two seats (Ody and Duck being re-elected, but Carter being defeated) and also three on Devizes Town Council, to which Jane Burton, Ted East, and Peter Smith were elected. In that year, the party reported to the Electoral Commission that it had 56 members and that its income and expenditure were both under £2000.

On 1 April 2009, the district of Kennet was abolished as part of the 2009 structural changes to local government in England, and the Devizes Guardians contested four seats in the first elections to the new Wiltshire Council unitary authority held on 4 June 2009. Its three successful candidates were Ody (Devizes and Roundway South), Carter (Devizes North), and Jane Burton (Devizes East).

At an annual general meeting held on 27 October 2009, the party celebrated its successes and stressed the importance of a new public consultation on planning policy for Wiltshire.

At the local elections on 2 May 2013, the Devizes Guardians won more than half the seats on Devizes Town Council, nine out of seventeen, defeating candidates from all three major English parties. At the same time they lost all their seats on Wiltshire Council to the Conservatives.

In January 2025, Devizes Guardians updated their constitution, data protection policy and financial regulations. They re-registered themselves as an independent political party in March 2025.

The Devizes Guardians nominated candidates for the Devizes Town Council elections of May 2025 in all four electoral wards of the town, North, South, East, and Roundway, and won all thirteen seats they stood for, making them the majority party.

Devizes Guardians councillors Jennie Britten and Vanessa Tanner were elected as Mayor of Devizes for the civic years 2025/26 and 2026/27, respectively.

== Wiltshire Council elections, 2009 ==
At the Wiltshire Council elections of 4 June 2009, the party contested four divisions and won three.

Party	Members elected
Conservative	61
Liberal Democrats	24
Independent	8
Devizes Guardians	3
Labour	2
Total	98
Source: Election results at Wiltshire Council website
