= 2009 Wiltshire Council election =

2009 UK local government election

4 June 2009	2013 →

All 98 seats to Wiltshire Council 50 seats needed for a majority
	First party	Second party	Third party
	Con	LD	Ind
Party	Conservative	Liberal Democrats	Independent
Seats won	62	24	7
Popular vote	66,985	46,375	12,905
Percentage	45.3%	31.4%	8.7%
	Fourth party	Fifth party
	DG	Lab
Party	Devizes Guardians	Labour
Seats won	3	2
Popular vote	1,503	6,852
Percentage	1.0%	4.6%
- Map showing the composition of Wiltshire Council following the election. Blue showing Conservative, Red showing Labour, Yellow showing Liberal Democrats, Grey showing Independents and Green showing the Devizes Guardians.
Elected Council control after election
Conservative

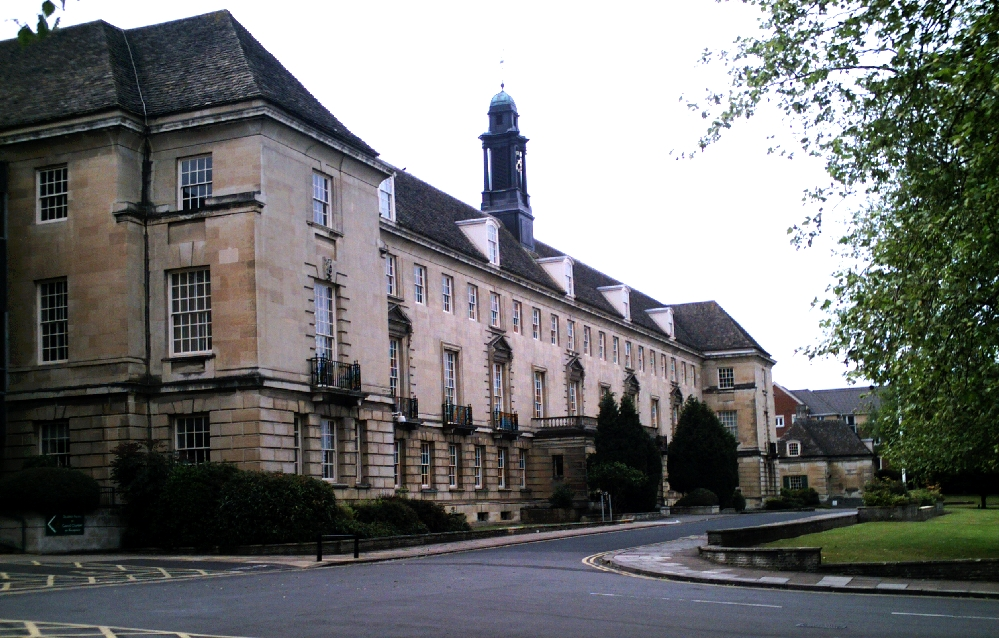
County Hall, Wiltshire Council's headquarters in Trowbridge

Elections to Wiltshire Council, a new unitary authority, were held on 4 June 2009.

The whole council of ninety-eight members was up for election, with each member to be elected in a single-member electoral division. None of the new electoral divisions was identical to any of the divisions or wards of the council's predecessors, Wiltshire County Council and the four district councils within its area, Kennet, North Wiltshire, Salisbury and West Wiltshire.

As with other county elections in England, these local elections in Wiltshire took place on the same day as the European elections of 2009. The 2005 Wiltshire County Council election, the last to the old county council, coincided with the general election of 2005, and the county elections of 1997 and 2001 had also coincided with general elections.

== Reorganization ==
Wiltshire's "two tier" system of local government until 2009 was typical of English shire counties, with the county, excluding the pre-existing unitary authority of Swindon, being sub-divided into four local government districts. However, the Department for Communities and Local Government announced on 25 July 2007 that with effect from 1 April 2009 Wiltshire was to be served by a new unitary authority, replacing Wiltshire County Council and the four district councils within its area, with Swindon continuing as a separate unitary authority.

Although the new authority came into being on 1 April 2009, the date on which the four district councils ceased to exist, the first elections to the new council were not held until 4 June. For some two months, the role of elected members of the new authority was carried out by the 48 outgoing Wiltshire county councillors and by an "Implementation Executive" consisting of eight members appointed from the outgoing county council and two members from each of the outgoing districts.

== Results ==
Wiltshire Council election, 2009
Party	Seats	Gains	Losses	Net gain/loss	Seats %	Votes %	Votes	+/−
Conservative	62	n/a	n/a	n/a	63.3	45.3	66,985	n/a
Liberal Democrats	24	n/a	n/a	n/a	24.5	31.4	46,373	n/a
Independent	7	n/a	n/a	n/a	7.1	8.7	12,905	n/a
UKIP	0	n/a	n/a	n/a	0	7.0	10,350	n/a
Labour	2	n/a	n/a	n/a	2.0	4.6	6,852	n/a
Devizes Guardians	3	n/a	n/a	n/a	3.0	1.0	1,503	n/a
Green	0	n/a	n/a	n/a	0	0.9	1,322	n/a
BNP	0	n/a	n/a	n/a	0	0.8	1,153	n/a
English Democrat	0	n/a	n/a	n/a	0	0.3	468	n/a

== Electoral division results ==
=== Aldbourne and Ramsbury ===
Aldbourne and Ramsbury
Party	Candidate	Votes	%	±%
Conservative	Christopher Paul Humphries	1,003	48.7	
Independent	Michael Andrew Edmonds	873	42.4	
UKIP	Jennifer Lee Puttick	164	8.0	
Majority		130		
Turnout			50.7	
Conservative win (new seat)				

=== Alderbury and Whiteparish ===
Alderbury and Whiteparish
Party	Candidate	Votes	%	±%
Conservative	Richard Britton	905	58.3	
Liberal Democrats	Colin Richard Baxter	370	23.9	
UKIP	Michael Wykeham	263	17.0	
Majority		535		
Turnout			45.6	
Conservative win (new seat)				

=== Amesbury East ===
Amesbury East
Party	Candidate	Votes	%	±%
Conservative	John Cornelis Noeken	621	50.2	
UKIP	Peter Leslie Cowdrey	322	26.1	
Liberal Democrats	Janet Mary Swindlehurst	283	22.9	
Majority		299		
Turnout			34.5	
Conservative win (new seat)				

=== Amesbury West ===
Amesbury West
Party	Candidate	Votes	%	±%
Conservative	Fred Westmoreland	635	46.0	
Liberal Democrats	John Thomas Swindlehurst	329	23.9	
UKIP	Brian Head	269	19.5	
BNP	Harry McPhie	143	10.4	
Majority		306		
Turnout			38.3	
Conservative win (new seat)				

=== Bourne and Woodford Valley ===
Bourne and Woodford Valley
Party	Candidate	Votes	%	±%
Conservative	Mike Hewitt	984	60.2	
Liberal Democrats	Naomi Piner	295	18.1	
UKIP	Jennifer Margaret MacDougall	257	15.7	
Labour	Virginia McLennan	89	5.4	
Majority		691		
Turnout			47.0	
Conservative win (new seat)				

=== Box and Colerne ===
Box and Colerne
Party	Candidate	Votes	%	±%
Conservative	Sheila Gladys Parker	689	35.9	
Liberal Democrats	Patricia Lillian Moore	641	33.4	
Green	Phillip Christopher Chamberlain	317	16.5	
UKIP	Richard Crowder	158	8.2	
Labour	Stephen Charles Wheeler	68	3.5	
BNP	Michael Howson	47	2.4	
Majority		48		
Turnout			50.0	
Conservative win (new seat)				

=== Bradford on Avon North ===
Bradford on Avon North
Party	Candidate	Votes	%	±%
Liberal Democrats	Rosemary Brown	1,244	59.2	
Conservative	Virginia Rose Fortescue	474	22.6	
Independent	David James Binding	276	13.1	
Labour	James Henry Tracey	96	4.6	
Majority		968		
Turnout			55.4	
Liberal Democrats win (new seat)				

=== Bradford on Avon South ===
Bradford on Avon South
Party	Candidate	Votes	%	±%
Liberal Democrats	Malcolm George Hewson	1,330	64.0	
Conservative	Gwen Allison	545	26.2	
Green	Ellie Crouch	142	6.8	
Labour	Angela Womersley	50	2.4	
Majority		785		
Turnout			54.7	
Liberal Democrats win (new seat)				

=== Brinkworth ===
Brinkworth
Party	Candidate	Votes	%	±%
Conservative	Toby Russell Sturgis	1,277	67.5	
Liberal Democrats	Frances Ann Goldstone	489	25.8	
Labour	Arnold Shaw	101	5.3	
Majority		788		
Turnout			51.3	
Conservative win (new seat)				

=== Bromham, Rowde and Potterne ===
Bromham, Rowde and Potterne
Party	Candidate	Votes	%	±%
Conservative	Philip Alfred Brown	751	43.2	
UKIP	Chris Cotton	322	18.5	
Liberal Democrats	Alan Rankin	318	18.3	
Green	Samantha Fletcher	255	14.7	
Labour	Andrew Derek Peter Jones	84	4.8	
Majority		429		
Turnout			44.8	
Conservative win (new seat)				

=== Bulford, Allington and Figheldean ===
Bulford, Allington and Figheldean
Party	Candidate	Votes	%	±%
Conservative	John Smale	581	44.9	
Liberal Democrats	John Richardson	429	33.2	
UKIP	Christopher Franklin	168	13.0	
BNP	Joyce Holt	115	8.9	
Majority		152		
Turnout			37.4	
Conservative win (new seat)				

=== Burbage and the Bedwyns ===
Burbage and the Bedwyns
Party	Candidate	Votes	%	±%
Conservative	Stuart Wheeler	1,050	62.8	
Liberal Democrats	Anthony Sycamore	397	23.7	
UKIP	Michael Bird	225	13.5	
Majority		653		
Turnout			43.6	
Conservative win (new seat)				

=== By Brook ===
By Brook
Party	Candidate	Votes	%	±%
Conservative	Jane Antoinette Scott	1,172	67.9	
Liberal Democrats	Catherine Sarah Messenger	241	14.0	
UKIP	John William Knight	197	11.4	
Labour	Christine Reid	68	3.9	
BNP	Susan Joan Simpkins	44	2.5	
Majority		931		
Turnout			50.9	
Conservative win (new seat)				

=== Calne Central ===
Calne Central
Party	Candidate	Votes	%	±%
Liberal Democrats	Howard Robin Marshall	655	48.9	
Conservative	Charles Madron Reginald Boase	654	48.8	
Majority		1		
Turnout			41.3	
Liberal Democrats win (new seat)				

=== Calne Chilvester and Abberd ===
Calne Chilvester and Abberd
Party	Candidate	Votes	%	±%
Conservative	Tony Trotman	581	43.8	
Liberal Democrats	Ross Henning	472	35.6	
UKIP	Julia Reid	208	15.7	
Green	Charlotte Gantlett	63	4.7	
Majority		109		
Turnout			39.0	
Conservative win (new seat)				

=== Calne North ===
Calne North
Party	Candidate	Votes	%	±%
Conservative	Chuck Berry	420	41.7	
Liberal Democrats	Peter Dolman	412	40.9	
Green	Sophy Fearnley-Whittingstall	164	16.3	
Majority		8		
Turnout			30.2	
Conservative win (new seat)				

=== Calne Rural ===
Calne Rural
Party	Candidate	Votes	%	±%
Conservative	Christine Crisp	723	45.0	
Independent	Nancy Suzanne Bryant	621	38.7	
Liberal Democrats	Sally Ann Chandler	250	15.6	
Majority		102		
Turnout			47.6	
Conservative win (new seat)				

=== Calne South and Cherhill ===
Calne South and Cherhill
Party	Candidate	Votes	%	±%
Conservative	Alan Kenneth Hill	944	53.2	
Liberal Democrats	Glenis Jean Ansell	782	44.1	
UKIP	Jennifer Margaret MacDougall	257	15.7	
Labour	Virginia McLennan	89	5.4	
Majority		162		
Turnout			47.5	
Conservative win (new seat)				

=== Chippenham Cepen Park and Derriads ===
Chippenham Cepen Park and Derriads
Party	Candidate	Votes	%	±%
Conservative	Peter John Hutton	849	60.4	
Liberal Democrats	Jesse Lake	438	31.2	
Labour	Pamela Witts	102	7.3	
Majority		411		
Turnout			41.0	
Conservative win (new seat)				

=== Chippenham Cepen Park and Redlands ===
Chippenham Cepen Park and Redlands
Party	Candidate	Votes	%	±%
Conservative	Nina Phillips	783	58.1	
Liberal Democrats	June Margaret Wood	275	20.4	
Labour	Maureen Frances Lloyd	171	12.7	
BNP	George Dale	114	8.5	
Majority		508		
Turnout			38.2	
Conservative win (new seat)				

=== Chippenham Hardenhuish ===
Chippenham Hardenhuish
Party	Candidate	Votes	%	±%
Liberal Democrats	Paul Richard Darby	992	62.3	
Conservative	Elizabeth Annette Kennedy	515	32.3	
Labour	Stephen William Abbott	68	4.3	
Majority		477		
Turnout			46.6	
Liberal Democrats win (new seat)				

=== Chippenham Hardens and England ===
Chippenham Hardens and England
Party	Candidate	Votes	%	±%
Liberal Democrats	Bill Douglas	584	50.9	
Conservative	Helen Rose Plenty	449	39.1	
Labour	Julie Lawrence	93	8.1	
Majority		135		
Turnout			36.4	
Liberal Democrats win (new seat)				

=== Chippenham Lowden and Rowden ===
Chippenham Lowden and Rowden
Party	Candidate	Votes	%	±%
Liberal Democrats	Judy Rooke	466	39.4	
Conservative	Martin Singlehurst	370	31.2	
UKIP	John Clifford	228	19.3	
Labour	Jeremy Comerford	73	6.2	
Independent	Alan Phillips	47	4.0	
Majority		96		
Turnout			35.6	
Liberal Democrats win (new seat)				

=== Chippenham Monkton ===
Chippenham Monkton
Party	Candidate	Votes	%	±%
Liberal Democrats	Chris Caswill	1,073	69.4	
Conservative	Janet Giles	310	20.0	
UKIP	Henry Collier	114	7.4	
Labour	Benjamin Lawrence	50	3.2	
Majority		763		
Turnout			55.2	
Liberal Democrats win (new seat)				

=== Chippenham Pewsham ===
Chippenham Pewsham
Party	Candidate	Votes	%	±%
Liberal Democrats	Mark Packard	806	55.9	
Conservative	Viv Vines	576	39.9	
Labour	Ian Perry	60	4.2	
Majority		230		
Turnout			43.1	
Liberal Democrats win (new seat)				

=== Chippenham Queens and Sheldon ===
Chippenham Queens and Sheldon
Party	Candidate	Votes	%	±%
Liberal Democrats	Desna Allen	700	51.9	
Conservative	Andy Phillips	558	41.3	
Labour	Brian Healy Lab	92	6.8	
Majority		142		
Turnout			40.3	
Liberal Democrats win (new seat)				

=== Corsham Pickwick ===
Corsham Pickwick
Party	Candidate	Votes	%	±%
Conservative	Alan MacRae	527	34.4	
Liberal Democrats	Lorraine Roberts-Rance	374	24.4	
Independent	Allan Charles Bosley	353	23.0	
Labour	Christopher John Lynch	154	10.0	
BNP	Michael Simpkins	111	7.2	
Majority		153		
Turnout			40.6	
Conservative win (new seat)				

=== Corsham Town ===
Corsham Town
Party	Candidate	Votes	%	±%
Conservative	Peter Roy Davis	788	37.8	
Liberal Democrats	Issy Langsford	673	32.3	
Independent	Nicholas John James Keyworth	487	23.4	
BNP	Tristan David Simpkins	68	3.3	
Labour	Judith Margaret Hible	58	2.8	
Majority		115		
Turnout			54.7	
Conservative win (new seat)				

=== Corsham Without and Box Hill ===
Corsham Without and Box Hill
Party	Candidate	Votes	%	±%
Conservative	Richard Leslie Tonge	1,208	62.2	
Liberal Democrats	Linda Mary Packard	480	24.7	
Labour	Hilary Ann Foord	147	7.6	
BNP	Michael Andrew Deacon	101	5.2	
Majority		728		
Turnout			49.6	
Conservative win (new seat)				

=== Cricklade and Latton ===
Cricklade and Latton
Party	Candidate	Votes	%	±%
Liberal Democrats	Peter Anthony Colmer	637	34.5	
Independent	Bob Jones	621	33.6	
Conservative	Tony Clements	577	31.2	
Majority		16		
Turnout			47.3	
Liberal Democrats win (new seat)				

=== Devizes and Roundway South ===
Devizes and Roundway South
Party	Candidate	Votes	%	±%
Devizes Guardians	Jeff Ody	549	35.9	
Conservative	Ray Parsons	475	31.1	
Labour	Ray Taylor	219	14.3	
UKIP	Carole Henson	153	10.0	
Liberal Democrats	Richard Pitts	127	8.3	
Majority		74		
Turnout			43.2	
Devizes Guardians win (new seat)				

=== Devizes East ===
Devizes East
Party	Candidate	Votes	%	±%
Devizes Guardians	Jane Mary Burton	369	34.3	
Conservative	Peter Evans	321	29.9	
UKIP	John Albert Ottaway	162	15.1	
Labour	Noel Woolrych	132	12.3	
Liberal Democrats	Jackie Watson	84	7.8	
Majority		48		
Turnout			34.5	
Devizes Guardians win (new seat)				

=== Devizes North ===
Devizes North
Party	Candidate	Votes	%	±%
Devizes Guardians	Nigel Denys Carter	381	31.6	
Conservative	Paula Mary Winchcombe	367	30.5	
UKIP	Ernie Giles	148	12.3	
Liberal Democrats	Rick Rowland	128	10.6	
Labour	Ian Mark Fletcher	101	8.4	
Green	Mark Fletcher	72	6.0	
Majority		14		
Turnout			41.0	
Devizes Guardians win (new seat)				

=== Downton and Ebble Valley ===
Downton and Ebble Valley
Party	Candidate	Votes	%	±%
Conservative	Julian Paul Johnson	887	54.5	
Liberal Democrats	Greg Condliffe	463	28.4	
UKIP	Pauline Pratt	263	16.1	
Majority		424		
Turnout			45.2	
Conservative win (new seat)				

=== Durrington and Larkhill ===
Durrington and Larkhill
Party	Candidate	Votes	%	±%
Liberal Democrats	Graham Wright	1,056	59.5	
Conservative	Mark Baker	466	26.6	
UKIP	James Steele	152	8.6	
BNP	Paul Holt	93	5.2	
Majority		590		
Turnout			40.1	
Liberal Democrats win (new seat)				

=== Ethandune ===
Ethandune
Party	Candidate	Votes	%	±%
Conservative	Julie Swabey	1,004	60.9	
Liberal Democrats	Christine Chilcott	467	28.3	
Labour	Janet Elizabeth Snooks	157	9.5	
Majority		537		
Turnout			45.9	
Conservative win (new seat)				

=== Fovant and Chalke Valley ===
Fovant and Chalke Valley
Party	Candidate	Votes	%	±%
Conservative	Jose Green	1,210	71.6	
Liberal Democrats	Stephen Radford	462	27.3	
Majority		748		
Turnout			49.2	
Conservative win (new seat)				

=== Hilperton ===
Hilperton
Party	Candidate	Votes	%	±%
Independent	Ernie Clark	1,402	77.2	
Conservative	Trace Senior	250	13.8	
Liberal Democrats	Poz Watson	162	8.9	
Majority		1,152		
Turnout			50.1	
Independent win (new seat)				

=== Holt and Staverton ===
Holt and Staverton
Party	Candidate	Votes	%	±%
Liberal Democrats	Trevor William Carbin	811	55.5	
Conservative	Carolyn Joy Walker	590	40.4	
Labour	Barrie Womersley	44	3.0	
Majority		221		
Turnout			45.8	
Liberal Democrats win (new seat)				

=== Kington ===
Kington
Party	Candidate	Votes	%	±%
Conservative	Howard Greenman	1,178	67.0	
Liberal Democrats	Michael Frank Short	429	24.4	
Labour	Sam Knight	137	7.8	
Majority		749		
Turnout			49	
Conservative win (new seat)				

=== Laverstock, Ford and Old Sarum ===
Laverstock, Ford and Old Sarum
Party	Candidate	Votes	%	±%
Labour	Ian David McLennan	652	47.6	
Conservative	Catherine Louise Hollis	409	29.9	
UKIP	Patrick Anthony Houston	180	13.1	
Liberal Democrats	Hilary Susan Phelps	121	8.8	
Majority		243		
Turnout			49.6	
Labour win (new seat)				

=== Ludgershall and Perham Down ===
Ludgershall and Perham Down
Party	Candidate	Votes	%	±%
Conservative	Chris Williams	590	51.7	
UKIP	Frank Baydon Bovingdon	277	24.3	
Liberal Democrats	Bryan Derek Castle	170	14.9	
Labour	Gary Gordon	100	8.8	
Majority		313		
Turnout			31.9	
Conservative win (new seat)				

=== Lyneham ===
Lyneham
Party	Candidate	Votes	%	±%
Conservative	Allison Mary Bucknell	900	62.0	
Liberal Democrats	John Allen Webb	396	27.3	
Independent	James Sidney William Elford	146	10.1	
Majority		504		
Turnout			40.1	
Conservative win (new seat)				

=== Malmesbury ===
Malmesbury
Party	Candidate	Votes	%	±%
Liberal Democrats	Simon John Killane	823	45.2	
Conservative	Rachel Lucy Miles	549	30.2	
Independent	Ray Sanderson	227	12.5	
UKIP	Bill Blake	162	8.9	
Labour	Frederick Albert Price	44	2.4	
Majority		274		
Turnout			49.2	
Liberal Democrats win (new seat)				

=== Marlborough East ===
Marlborough East
Party	Candidate	Votes	%	±%
Liberal Democrats	Peggy Ann Dow	636	51.3	
Conservative	Marian Hannaford	377	30.4	
UKIP	Caroline Georgina Goodfellow	159	12.8	
Labour	Brian Andrew Lawrence McClintock	65	5.2	
Majority		259		
Turnout			40.8	
Liberal Democrats win (new seat)				

=== Marlborough West ===
Marlborough West
Party	Candidate	Votes	%	±%
Independent	Nicholas Fogg	886	58.4	
Conservative	Stewart Dobson	482	31.8	
UKIP	Lincoln Williams	82	5.4	
Labour	Madeleine Rosina Urquhart	52	3.4	
Majority		404		
Turnout			50.0	
Independent win (new seat)				

=== Melksham Central ===
Melksham Central
Party	Candidate	Votes	%	±%
Liberal Democrats	Steve Petty	554	45.4	
Conservative	Philip Alford	534	43.8	
Labour	Jo Sibley	110	9.0	
Majority		20		
Turnout			32.7	
Liberal Democrats win (new seat)				

=== Melksham North ===
Melksham North
Party	Candidate	Votes	%	±%
Conservative	Rod Eaton	535	51.2	
Liberal Democrats	Andrew Robert Barnett Clayton	425	40.7	
Labour	Margaret Ethel White	66	6.3	
Majority		110		
Turnout			31.5	
Conservative win (new seat)				

=== Melksham South ===
Melksham South
Party	Candidate	Votes	%	±%
Liberal Democrats	Jon Hubbard	1,117	63.9	
Conservative	Richard Wiltshire	536	30.7	
Labour	James McGee	87	5.0	
Majority		581		
Turnout			44.2	
Liberal Democrats win (new seat)				

=== Melksham Without North ===
Melksham Without North
Party	Candidate	Votes	%	±%
Conservative	Mark Griffiths	906	57.8	
Liberal Democrats	David Bolwell	536	34.2	
Labour	Gregory Coombes	126	8.0	
Majority		370		
Turnout			46.4	
Conservative win (new seat)				

=== Melksham Without South ===
Melksham Without South
Party	Candidate	Votes	%	±%
Conservative	Roy While	571	41.5	
Liberal Democrats	Terry Welch	361	26.3	
UKIP	Paul Carter	162	11.8	
Independent	Michael Sankey	116	8.4	
BNP	Mark Kennedy	92	6.7	
Labour	Louise Smith	73	5.3	
Majority		210		
Turnout			37.3	
Conservative win (new seat)				

=== Mere ===
Mere
Party	Candidate	Votes	%	±%
Independent	George Jeans	1,188	54.4	
Conservative	Catherine Spencer	887	40.7	
UKIP	Patricia Walker	107	4.9	
Majority		301		
Turnout			61.4	
Independent win (new seat)				

=== Minety ===
Minety
Party	Candidate	Votes	%	±%
Conservative	Carole Soden	1,464	75.5	
Liberal Democrats	Russell Dabson	402	20.7	
Labour	Pauline Smith	73	3.8	
Majority		1,062		
Turnout			51.1	
Conservative win (new seat)				

=== Nadder and East Knoyle ===
Nadder and East Knoyle
Party	Candidate	Votes	%	±%
Conservative	Bridget Wayman	932	52.0	
Independent	David Parker	593	33.4	
UKIP	David Boyden	258	14.5	
Majority		330		
Turnout			51.6	
Conservative win (new seat)				

=== Pewsey ===
Pewsey
Party	Candidate	Votes	%	±%
Conservative	Jeremy Kunkler	878	50.4	
Independent	John Cooke	417	23.9	
Liberal Democrats	Tricia Cavill	185	10.6	
UKIP	Marilyn Day	174	10.0	
Labour	Christine Jenkins	88	5.1	
Majority		461		
Turnout			47.3	
Conservative win (new seat)				

=== Pewsey Vale ===
Pewsey Vale
Party	Candidate	Votes	%	±%
Conservative	Robert Wallace Strachan Hall	762	44.3	
Liberal Democrats	Fiona Clare Hornby	362	21.1	
Independent	Tony Molland	276	16.1	
UKIP	Brian John Doherty	249	14.5	
Labour	Frank Jeffrey	66	3.8	
Majority		400		
Turnout			47.9	
Conservative win (new seat)				

=== Purton ===
Purton
Party	Candidate	Votes	%	±%
Conservative	Jacqui Lay	753	52.4	
Liberal Democrats	Trudie Clarkson	357	24.8	
Independent	Geoffrey Greenaway	319	22.2	
Majority		396		
Turnout			43.5	
Conservative win (new seat)				

=== Redlynch and Landford ===
Redlynch and Landford
Party	Candidate	Votes	%	±%
Conservative	Leo Randall	1,071	64.8	
Liberal Democrats	Malcolm Adams	555	33.6	
Majority		516		
Turnout			44.4	
Conservative win (new seat)				

=== Roundway ===
Roundway
Party	Candidate	Votes	%	±%
Conservative	Laura Evelyn Mayes	522	45.0	
Liberal Democrats	Mark Fell	210	18.1	
Devizes Guardians	Ted East	204	17.6	
UKIP	Philip Maslen	147	12.7	
Labour	Jim Thorpe	73	6.3	
Majority		312		
Turnout			38.7	
Conservative win (new seat)				

=== Salisbury Bemerton ===
Salisbury Bemerton
Party	Candidate	Votes	%	±%
Labour	Ricky Rogers	456	37.1	
Conservative	Penny Brown	273	22.2	
Liberal Democrats	John Patrick Abbott	212	17.2	
UKIP	Tony Morland	192	15.6	
BNP	Luci Taylor	84	6.8	
Majority		183		
Turnout			30.5	
Labour win (new seat)				

=== Salisbury Fisherton & Bemerton Village ===
Salisbury Fisherton & Bemerton Village
Party	Candidate	Votes	%	±%
Conservative	Christopher Gordon Cochrane	496	38.8	
Liberal Democrats	Jo Broom	451	35.3	
Labour	John Michael Perings Walsh	300	23.5	
Majority		45		
Turnout			36.4	
Conservative win (new seat)				

=== Salisbury Harnham ===
Salisbury Harnham
Party	Candidate	Votes	%	±%
Liberal Democrats	Brian Edward Dalton	745	45.7	
Conservative	Frank Robson	668	41.0	
UKIP	Susan Elizabeth Shearn	206	12.6	
Majority		77		
Turnout			44.3	
Liberal Democrats win (new seat)				

=== Salisbury St Edmund & Milford ===
Salisbury St Edmund & Milford
Party	Candidate	Votes	%	±%
Liberal Democrats	Paul Sample	849	54.9	
Conservative	John Rodell	364	23.5	
UKIP	Fiona Claire McWilliam	201	13.0	
Labour	Clare Miranda Moody	119	7.7	
Majority		485		
Turnout			41.3	
Liberal Democrats win (new seat)				

=== Salisbury St Francis and Stratford ===
Salisbury St Francis and Stratford
Party	Candidate	Votes	%	±%
Conservative	Mary Jacquelin Douglas	1,024	53.7	
Liberal Democrats	Tony Thorpe	783	41.1	
Labour	Mark Riches	99	5.2	
Majority		241		
Turnout			46.6	
Conservative win (new seat)				

=== Salisbury St Marks and Bishopdown ===
Salisbury St Marks and Bishopdown
Party	Candidate	Votes	%	±%
Conservative	William Raybould Moss	539	38.0	
Liberal Democrats	James Campbell Robertson	459	32.4	
Labour	Clive Robert Vincent	83	5.9	
Majority		80		
Turnout			41.6	
Conservative win (new seat)				

=== Salisbury St Martins and Cathedral ===
Salisbury St Martins and Cathedral
Party	Candidate	Votes	%	±%
Conservative	John Anthony Brady	605	31.2	
Liberal Democrats	Bobbie Chettleburgh	597	30.8	
Labour	Ian Robert Tomes	515	26.6	
UKIP	Frances Mary Patricia Howard	212	10.9	
Majority		8		
Turnout			44.8	
Conservative win (new seat)				

=== Salisbury St Pauls ===
Salisbury St Pauls
Party	Candidate	Votes	%	±%
Conservative	Richard John Clewer	353	27.2	
Liberal Democrats	Robert William Steel	294	22.6	
Labour	Paul Michael Clegg	280	21.5	
Independent	Andrew Charles Righton Roberts	268	20.6	
Independent	Graham Ernest Prior	89	6.8	
Majority		59		
Turnout			36.9	
Conservative win (new seat)				

=== Sherston ===
Sherston
Party	Candidate	Votes	%	±%
Conservative	John Percy Simon Stuart Thomson	1,299	69.9	
Liberal Democrats	Ian Ashby	470	25.3	
Labour	Susan Marion Ford	77	4.1	
Majority		829		
Turnout			50.7	
Conservative win (new seat)				

=== Southwick ===
Southwick
Party	Candidate	Votes	%	±%
Conservative	Tony Phillips	807	59.9	
Liberal Democrats	David John Lovell	522	38.7	
Majority		285		
Turnout			39.8	
Conservative win (new seat)				

=== Summerham and Seend ===
Summerham and Seend
Party	Candidate	Votes	%	±%
Conservative	Jonathon Seed	1,033	54.9	
Liberal Democrats	Robert Oglesby	212	17.2	
UKIP	John Maurice Ryan	230	12.2	
Majority		426		
Turnout			53.7	
Conservative win (new seat)				

=== The Collingbournes and Netheravon ===
The Collingbournes and Netheravon
Party	Candidate	Votes	%	±%
Conservative	Charles Howard	831	53.5	
UKIP	Alan Stephen Wood	503	32.4	
Liberal Democrats	Katherine Walling	214	13.8	
Majority		328		
Turnout			46.2	
Conservative win (new seat)				

=== The Lavingtons and Erlestoke ===
The Lavingtons and Erlestoke
Party	Candidate	Votes	%	±%
Conservative	Richard Gamble	929	48.6	
UKIP	Mike Bridgeman	535	28.0	
Liberal Democrats	John Kirk Wilson	170	8.9	
Green	Hilary Pound	157	8.2	
Labour	David Wearn	121	6.3	
Majority		394		
Turnout			46.4	
Conservative win (new seat)				

=== Tidworth ===
Tidworth
Party	Candidate	Votes	%	±%
Conservative	Mark Connolly	569	67.3	
UKIP	Dottie Halfon	160	18.9	
Liberal Democrats	Martin Lee	110	13	
Majority		409		
Turnout			23.2	
Conservative win (new seat)				

=== Till and Wylye Valley ===
Till and Wylye Valley
Party	Candidate	Votes	%	±%
Liberal Democrats	Ian West	1,064	55.7	
Conservative	Ian Mitchell	693	36.3	
BNP	Barry Witheridge	141	7.4	
Majority		371		
Turnout			54.2	
Liberal Democrats win (new seat)				

=== Tisbury ===
Tisbury
Party	Candidate	Votes	%	±%
Conservative	Tony Deane	803	52	
Liberal Democrats	John Holt	498	32.2	
UKIP	Timothy Barter	240	15.5	
Majority		305		
Turnout			45	
Conservative win (new seat)				

=== Trowbridge Adcroft ===
Trowbridge Adcroft
Party	Candidate	Votes	%	±%
Independent	Tom James	419	35.8	
Liberal Democrats	Nicholas Blakemore	406	34.7	
Conservative	David Halik	345	29.5	
Majority		13		
Turnout			36.9	
Independent win (new seat)				

=== Trowbridge Central ===
Trowbridge Central
Party	Candidate	Votes	%	±%
Liberal Democrats	John Knight	713	68.4	
Conservative	Chris March	329	31.6	
Majority		384		
Turnout			30.8	
Liberal Democrats win (new seat)				

=== Trowbridge Drynham ===
Trowbridge Drynham
Party	Candidate	Votes	%	±%
Conservative	Graham Payne	641	64.2	
Liberal Democrats	Marcus Francis	358	35.8	
Majority		283		
Turnout			32.1	
Conservative win (new seat)				

=== Trowbridge Grove ===
Trowbridge Grove
Party	Candidate	Votes	%	±%
Liberal Democrats	Jeff Osborn	816	68.2	
Conservative	Colin Callow	311	26.0	
Labour	Gordon Cox	70	5.8	
Majority		505		
Turnout			35.5	
Liberal Democrats win (new seat)				

=== Trowbridge Lambrok ===
Trowbridge Lambrok
Party	Candidate	Votes	%	±%
Liberal Democrats	Helen Osborn	700	57.3	
Conservative	Doug Ross	522	42.7	
Majority		178		
Turnout			34.5	
Conservative win (new seat)				

=== Trowbridge Park ===
Trowbridge Park
Party	Candidate	Votes	%	±%
Conservative	Peter Fuller	430	42.8	
Liberal Democrats	Rollie Cleere	305	30.3	
Green	David McQueen	152	15.1	
Labour	Sean Semple	105	10.4	
Majority		125		
Turnout			30.8	
Conservative win (new seat)				

=== Trowbridge Paxcroft ===
Trowbridge Paxcroft
Party	Candidate	Votes	%	±%
Liberal Democrats	Steve Oldrieve	683	62.5	
Conservative	Doug Ross	399	36.5	
Majority		284		
Turnout			39.3	
Liberal Democrats win (new seat)				

=== Urchfont and The Cannings ===
Warminster Copheap and Wylye
Party	Candidate	Votes	%	±%
Conservative	Lionel Grundy	642	37.9	
UKIP	Steve Hamilton	410	24.2	
Independent	Tony Adamson	359	21.2	
Liberal Democrats	Michael Maude	205	12.1	
Labour	Sue Buxton	79	4.7	
Majority		232		
Turnout			50.4	
Conservative win (new seat)				

=== Warminster Broadway ===
Warminster Broadway
Party	Candidate	Votes	%	±%
Conservative	Keith Maurice Humphries	610	40.9	
Liberal Democrats	Paul Batchelor	480	32.2	
UKIP	Keith Malcolm Green	261	17.5	
English Democrat	Michael John Turner	132	8.9	
Majority		130		
Turnout			40.6	
Conservative win (new seat)				

=== Warminster Copheap and Wylye ===
Warminster Copheap and Wylye
Party	Candidate	Votes	%	±%
Independent	Christopher Newbury	824	49.7	
Conservative	Michael Burke Mounde	527	31.8	
Liberal Democrats	Graham Thomas Hedley	112	6.8	
UKIP	Charlotte Mozley	117	7.1	
English Democrat	Steve Martin	77	4.6	
Majority		297		
Turnout			45.2	
Independent win (new seat)				

=== Warminster East ===
Warminster East
Party	Candidate	Votes	%	±%
Conservative	Andrew Davis	705	44.7	
Independent	Paul Ian Macdonald	302	19.1	
Liberal Democrats	Guy Fancourt	282	17.9	
UKIP	Andrew Newman Mozley	168	10.6	
English Democrat	Dave Carpenter	115	7.3	
Majority		403		
Turnout			39.5	
Conservative win (new seat)				

=== Warminster West ===
Warminster West
Party	Candidate	Votes	%	±%
Conservative	Pip Ridout	587	46.8	
Liberal Democrats	Roger John Coveney	249	19.9	
Independent	Steve Dancey	201	16.0	
UKIP	Mark Boyden	153	12.2	
English Democrat	May Joan Law	59	4.7	
Majority		338		
Turnout			32.6	
Conservative win (new seat)				

=== Warminster Without ===
Warminster Without
Party	Candidate	Votes	%	±%
Conservative	Fleur de Rhé-Philipe	999	61.9	
Liberal Democrats	Ray Beaty	376	23.3	
UKIP	James Alan Bell	224	13.9	
Majority		623		
Turnout			46.8	
Conservative win (new seat)				

=== West Selkley ===
West Selkley
Party	Candidate	Votes	%	±%
Conservative	Jemima Milton	785	50.0	
Liberal Democrats	Graham Francis	276	17.6	
Independent	James Sheppard	212	13.5	
UKIP	John Black	201	12.8	
Labour	Kamella Hopkins	96	6.1	
Majority		509		
Turnout			46.4	
Conservative win (new seat)				

=== Westbury East ===
Westbury East
Party	Candidate	Votes	%	±%
Independent	Mike Cuthbert-Murray	428	31.2	
Liberal Democrats	Gordon Ian King	386	28.1	
Conservative	Georgina Denison-Pender	375	27.3	
UKIP	Ben Parker	95	6.9	
English Democrat	Gillian Anne Apps	85	6.2	
Majority		42		
Turnout			37.3	
Independent win (new seat)				

=== Westbury North ===
Westbury North
Party	Candidate	Votes	%	±%
Liberal Democrats	David Jenkins	508	47.7	
Conservative	Sue Ezra	379	35.6	
Independent	Francis Morland	162	15.2	
Majority		129		
Turnout			32.1	
Liberal Democrats win (new seat)				

=== Westbury West ===
Westbury West
Party	Candidate	Votes	%	±%
Independent	Russell Mark Jonathan Hawker	471	48.3	
Conservative	Veronica Dorothy Anne Burden	242	24.8	
Liberal Democrats	Alan Rigg	148	15.2	
Labour	Christine Linda Mitchell	98	10.1	
Majority		229		
Turnout			27.1	
Independent win (new seat)				

=== Wilton and Lower Wylye Valley ===
Wilton and Lower Wylye Valley
Party	Candidate	Votes	%	±%
Conservative	Richard Beattie	614	39.4	
Liberal Democrats	Peter Edge	592	38.0	
UKIP	Ann Kingston	264	16.9	
Labour	David Roberts	89	5.7	
Majority		22		
Turnout			43	
Conservative win (new seat)				

=== Winsley and Westwood ===
Winsley and Westwood
Party	Candidate	Votes	%	±%
Conservative	Linda Conley	829	49.3	
Liberal Democrats	Neil Pocock	746	44.4	
Labour	Nikki Kenna	106	6.3	
Majority		83		
Turnout			49.8	
Conservative win (new seat)				

=== Winterslow ===
Winterslow
Party	Candidate	Votes	%	±%
Conservative	Christopher Devine	1,092	69.6	
Liberal Democrats	Peter Yeldon	477	30.4	
Majority		615		
Turnout			51.3	
Conservative win (new seat)				

=== Wootton Bassett East ===
Wootton Bassett East
Party	Candidate	Votes	%	±%
Conservative	Mollie Eileen May Groom	1,051	70.5	
Liberal Democrats	Keith Dixon	431	28.9	
Majority		620		
Turnout			41.0	
Conservative win (new seat)				

=== Wootton Bassett North ===
Wootton Bassett North
Party	Candidate	Votes	%	±%
Conservative	Bill Roberts	689	51.2	
Liberal Democrats	Stephen Richard Walls	627	46.6	
Majority		62		
Turnout			37.1	
Conservative win (new seat)				

=== Wootton Bassett South ===
Wootton Bassett South
Party	Candidate	Votes	%	±%
Conservative	Peter Joseph Doyle	680	41.9	
Liberal Democrats	Jenny Stratton	618	38.1	
UKIP	Peter Anthony Smith	248	15.3	
Labour	Ellis Webb	70	4.3	
Majority		62		
Turnout			41.8	
Conservative win (new seat)				

== By-elections between 2009 and 2013 ==
Between 2009 and 2013 the composition of the council changed significantly. After the 2009 local elections the council consisted of 62 Conservatives, 24 Liberal Democrats, seven independent councillors, three Devizes Guardians, and two Labour. In September 2009 and December 2010, an Independent joining UKIP while remaining in the Independent group, a defection in May 2012 by a Liberal Democrat councillor to the Conservatives, and in November 2012 by another Lib Dem and a Conservative to the Independents, by the beginning of 2013 Wiltshire Council consisted of 61 Conservatives, 22 Liberal Democrats, ten Independents including one UKIP member, three Devizes Guardians, and two Labour members.

=== Southwick ===
Southwick By-Election 3 September 2009
Party	Candidate	Votes	%	±%
Independent	Francis Morland	385	37.1	+ 37.1
Liberal Democrats	Gordon Ian King	315	30.3	−8.4
Conservative	David Edward Halik	273	26.3	−33.6
UKIP	Benjamin Anthony Parker	61	5.9	+ 5.9
Majority		70		
Turnout		1,034	30.66	
Independent gain from Conservative		Swing	+35.3	

=== Bromham, Rowde and Potterne ===
Bromham, Rowde and Potterne By-Election 21 December 2010
Party	Candidate	Votes	%	±%
Conservative	Liz Bryant	561	53.5	+10.3
Liberal Democrats	Paul Mortimer	358	34.2	+15.9
Labour	Andrew Derek Peter Jones	74	7.06	+2.3
Independent	Pat Bryant	55	5.3	N/A
Majority		203		
Turnout		1052	27.1	−17.7
Conservative hold		Swing	-2.8	

== See also ==
- Wiltshire local elections
