= Gavin Grant (executive) =

British executive (born 1955)

- Born: Liam Gavin Grant; 20 June 1955 (age 71)
- Education: Roan Grammar School for Boys; University of Reading
- Occupation: Public relations professional

Liam Gavin Grant (born 20 June 1955) is a British public relations professional and from January 2012 to 25 February 2014 was chief executive officer of the Royal Society for the Prevention of Cruelty to Animals. Grant is a former UK Chairman of PR firm Burson-Marsteller.

== Early life ==
Grant was brought up on a south London council estate though had moved from the estate by the time he was attending secondary school. His mother was a needleshop-worker and his father was a cellophane salesman. Grant was educated at Roan Grammar School for Boys (1966–1973) and the University of Reading (1973–1977).

He was a member of the Young Liberals and became the University of Reading's youngest student union president.

== Career ==
After graduating, he joined an anti-racism campaign group and reported for the Thatcher government on community race relations.

From 1987-88 he was campaigns director at the Council for the Protection of Rural England. He worked as director of communications for the RSPCA from 1988-91. In 1991, he joined as public affairs director at the Association of Unit Trusts and Investment Funds.

He worked as corporate communications manager at The Body Shop International from 1993 to 1999, where he campaigned against the use of animal testing for cosmetics. As UK chairman of PR company Burson-Marsteller from 2006 to 2011, his corporate clients included Unilever, and he helped establish its corporate social responsibility unit.

== Politics ==
Gavin Grant has been a lifelong member of the Liberal Party and its successor the Liberal Democrats. He chaired the Western Counties regional party in 2011.

Grant has advised successive Liberal Democrat leaders, including Deputy Prime Minister Nick Clegg, and in 2007 he was part of Clegg's campaign to become party leader.

He was elected to Wiltshire Council as the councillor for Malmesbury at the 2017 Wiltshire Council election and re-elected in 2021.

Grant was Mayor of Malmesbury from 2023 to May 2024

== Personal life ==
He lives in Wiltshire and rents a flat in Horsham, West Sussex.

== See also ==
- 2017 Wiltshire Council election
