= 2021 Wiltshire Council election =

2021 UK local government election

- 6 May 2021

All 98 seats to Wiltshire Council 50 seats needed for a majority
| | First party | Second party |
|---|---|---|
| | Con | Lib |
| Leader | Philip Whitehead | Ian Thorn |
| Party | Conservative | Liberal Democrats |
| Leader's seat | Urchfont and Bishops Cannings | Calne Central |
| Last election | 68 seats, 52.0% | 20 seats, 27.0% |
| Seats won | 61 | 27 |
| Seat change | ▼7 | ▲7 |
| Popular vote | 71,711 | 42,654 |
| Percentage | 47.3% | 28.1% |
| Swing | ▼4.7 pp | ▲1.1 pp |
| | Third party | Fourth party |
| | Ind | Lab |
| Leader | Ernie Clark | Ricky Rogers |
| Party | Independent | Labour |
| Leader's seat | Hilperton | Salisbury Bemerton |
| Last election | 7 seats, 8.5% | 3 seats, 9.2% |
| Seats won | 7 | 3 |
| Seat change | Steady | Steady |
| Popular vote | 13,236 | 11,699 |
| Percentage | 8.7% | 7.7% |
| Swing | ▲0.2 pp | ▼1.5 pp |
- Map showing the composition of Wiltshire Council following the election. Blue showing Conservative, Red showing Labour, Yellow showing Liberal Democrats and Grey showing Independents.
Council control before election
Conservative
Council control after election
Conservative

The 2021 Wiltshire Council election took place on 6 May 2021 as part of the 2021 local elections in the United Kingdom. All 98 councillors were elected from electoral divisions which returned one councillor each by first-past-the-post voting for a four-year term of office.

== Council composition ==
After the previous election the composition of the council was:

↓
| 68 | 20 | 7 | 3 |
| Con | LD | Ind | Lab |

Prior to the election the composition of the council was:

↓
| 62 | 21 | 11 | 3 |
| Con | LD | Ind | Lab |

After the election the composition of the council was:

↓
| 61 | 27 | 7 | 3 |
| Con | LD | Ind | Lab |

== Results summary ==
Wiltshire Council election, 2021
| Party | Candidates | | | | | | Votes | | |
| Party | Stood | Elected | Gained | Unseated | Net | % of total | % | No. | Net % |
|---|---|---|---|---|---|---|---|---|---|
| Conservative | 98 | 61 | – | 4 | ▼7 | 62.2% | 47.3% | 71,711 | ▼4.7% |
| Liberal Democrats | 90 | 27 | – | 2 | ▲7 | 27.6% | 28.1% | 42,654 | ▲1.1% |
| Independent | 33 | 7 | – | 1 | Steady | 7.1% | 8.7% | 13,236 | ▲0.2% |
| Labour | 54 | 3 | – | – | Steady | 3.1% | 7.7% | 11,699 | ▼1.5% |
| Green | 67 | 0 | – | – | Steady | 0% | 8.1% | 12,234 | ▲6% |
| UKIP | 1 | 0 | – | – | Steady | 0% | 0.0% | 61 | N/A |
| For Britain | 1 | 0 | – | – | Steady | 0% | 0.0% | 33 | N/A |

== Electoral division results ==
The electoral division results listed below are based on the changes from the 2017 elections, not taking into account any party defections or by-elections.

Sitting councillors are marked with an asterisk (*).

=== Aldbourne and Ramsbury ===
Aldbourne and Ramsbury
| Party | Candidate | Votes | % | ±% |
|---|---|---|---|---|
| Conservative | James Henry Sheppard * | 1,194 | 64.44 | –2.96 |
| Green | Charlie O'Farrell | 279 | 15.06 | +9.66 |
| Liberal Democrats | Rodney Ian Cleasby | 199 | 10.74 | –7.06 |
| Labour | George Henry Cheese | 181 | 9.77 | +0.37 |
| Majority | | 915 | 49.38 | +0.22 |
| Turnout | | 1,867 | 41.56 | +2.76 |
| Registered electors | | 4,492 | | |
| Conservative hold | | Swing | | |

=== Alderbury and Whiteparish ===
Alderbury and Whiteparish
| Party | Candidate | Votes | % | ±% |
|---|---|---|---|---|
| Conservative | Richard Britton * | 1,208 | 59.60 | +2.0 |
| Green | Martin Wybert Plimsoll | 331 | 16.33 | N/A |
| Liberal Democrats | Colin Richard Baxter | 315 | 15.54 | +7.04 |
| Labour | Olivia McLennan | 173 | 8.53 | +0.93 |
| Majority | | 877 | 43.27 | +8.67 |
| Turnout | | 2,043 | 45.32 | +4.32 |
| Registered electors | | 4,508 | | |
| Conservative hold | | Swing | | |

=== Amesbury East and Bulford ===
Amesbury East and Bulford
| Party | Candidate | Votes | % | ±% |
|---|---|---|---|---|
| Conservative | Mark Gregory Verbinnen | 698 | 67.90 | N/A |
| Labour | Ian Alexander Jones | 176 | 17.12 | N/A |
| Liberal Democrats | Marcus Mann | 106 | 10.31 | N/A |
| Green | Sue Wright | 48 | 4.67 | N/A |
| Majority | | 522 | 50.78 | N/A |
| Turnout | | 1,037 | 24.13 | N/A |
| Registered electors | | 4,297 | | |
| Conservative win (new seat) | | | | |

=== Amesbury South ===
Amesbury South
| Party | Candidate | Votes | % | ±% |
|---|---|---|---|---|
| Conservative | Rob Yuill * | 664 | 64.97 | N/A |
| Labour | Tony James Mears | 223 | 21.82 | N/A |
| Green | Michael Robert Pope | 70 | 6.85 | N/A |
| Liberal Democrats | Andrew North | 65 | 6.36 | N/A |
| Majority | | 441 | 43.15 | N/A |
| Turnout | | 1,024 | 29.34 | N/A |
| Registered electors | | 3,490 | | |
| Conservative win (new seat) | | | | |

=== Amesbury West ===
Amesbury West
| Party | Candidate | Votes | % | ±% |
|---|---|---|---|---|
| Conservative | Monica Devendran | 860 | 65.20 | –9.00 |
| Labour | Timothy Roderic Sedgwick-Jell | 205 | 15.54 | +1.24 |
| Green | Di Cross | 139 | 10.54 | N/A |
| Liberal Democrats | Dominique Claire Hall | 115 | 8.72 | –2.78 |
| Majority | | 655 | 49.66 | –9.34 |
| Turnout | | 1,330 | 30.81 | –1.49 |
| Registered electors | | 4,317 | | |
| Conservative hold | | Swing | | |

=== Avon Valley ===
Avon Valley
| Party | Candidate | Votes | % | ±% |
|---|---|---|---|---|
| Conservative | Ian Charles Duke Blair-Pilling * | 697 | 67.67 | N/A |
| Independent | Alan Stephen Wood | 149 | 14.47 | N/A |
| Green | Lesley Alyson Jupp | 96 | 9.32 | N/A |
| Liberal Democrats | Elizabeth Fiona Genner | 88 | 8.54 | N/A |
| Majority | | 548 | 52.90 | N/A |
| Turnout | | 1,041 | 27.60 | N/A |
| Registered electors | | 3,772 | | |
| Conservative win (new seat) | | | | |

Note: in 2017, Ian Blair-Pilling was elected in the Collingbournes and Netheravon

=== Bowerhill ===
Bowerhill
| Party | Candidate | Votes | % | ±% |
|---|---|---|---|---|
| Conservative | Nick Holder * | 799 | 75.95 | N/A |
| Liberal Democrats | Malcolm George Hewson | 253 | 24.05 | N/A |
| Majority | | 546 | 51.90 | N/A |
| Turnout | | 1,072 | 32.58 | N/A |
| Registered electors | | 3,290 | | |
| Conservative win (new seat) | | | | |

Note: Nick Holder was elected in a 2019 by-election in Melksham Without South.

=== Box and Colerne ===
Box and Colerne
| Party | Candidate | Votes | % | ±% |
|---|---|---|---|---|
| Liberal Democrats | Brian George Felton Mathew * | 1,260 | 65.56 | +13.16 |
| Conservative | Sheila Gladys Parker | 662 | 34.44 | –9.36 |
| Majority | | 598 | 31.11 | +22.51 |
| Turnout | | 1,943 | 48.89 | –0.31 |
| Registered electors | | 3,974 | | |
| Liberal Democrats hold | | Swing | | |

=== Bradford-on-Avon North ===
Bradford-on-Avon North
| Party | Candidate | Votes | % | ±% |
|---|---|---|---|---|
| Liberal Democrats | Tim Trimble | 1,000 | 48.24 | –11.56 |
| Independent | Simon Laird McNeill-Ritchie | 447 | 21.56 | N/A |
| Conservative | Roy Andrew Hayward | 428 | 20.65 | –19.65 |
| Green | John Richard Pearce | 198 | 9.55 | N/A |
| Majority | | 553 | 26.68 | +7.78 |
| Turnout | | 2,089 | 52.93 | –3.57 |
| Registered electors | | 3,947 | | |
| Liberal Democrats hold | | Swing | | |

=== Bradford-on-Avon South ===
Bradford-on-Avon South
| Party | Candidate | Votes | % | ±% |
|---|---|---|---|---|
| Liberal Democrats | Sarah Gibson * | 1,591 | 74.80 | +19.00 |
| Conservative | Clive Hilton | 536 | 25.20 | –8.60 |
| Majority | | 1,055 | 49.60 | +27.70 |
| Turnout | | 2,156 | 52.14 | –0.66 |
| Registered electors | | 4,135 | | |
| Liberal Democrats hold | | Swing | | |

=== Brinkworth ===
Brinkworth
| Party | Candidate | Votes | % | ±% |
|---|---|---|---|---|
| Conservative | Elizabeth Buff Threlfall | 1,114 | 51.05 | –14.35 |
| Liberal Democrats | Chris Hurst * | 993 | 45.51 | +10.91 |
| Labour | Philip Kwasi Gyawu Baffour | 75 | 3.44 | N/A |
| Majority | | 121 | 5.55 | –25.15 |
| Turnout | | 2,187 | 58.77 | +13.57 |
| Registered electors | | 3,721 | | |
| Conservative hold | | Swing | | |

Note: in 2017, Chris Hirst was elected in Royal Wootton Bassett South

=== Bromham, Rowde and Roundway ===
Bromham, Rowde and Roundway
| Party | Candidate | Votes | % | ±% |
|---|---|---|---|---|
| Conservative | Laura Evelyn Mayes * | 1,118 | 64.03 | N/A |
| Liberal Democrats | Mark Domnech William Mangham | 474 | 27.15 | N/A |
| Labour | William Michael Wescott | 154 | 8.82 | N/A |
| Majority | | 644 | 36.88 | N/A |
| Turnout | | 1,763 | 45.74 | N/A |
| Registered electors | | 3,854 | | |
| Conservative win (new seat) | | | | |

Note: in 2017, Laura Evelyn Mayes was elected in Roundway

=== By Brook ===
By Brook
| Party | Candidate | Votes | % | ±% |
|---|---|---|---|---|
| Conservative | Nick Botterill | 935 | 61.63 | –9.87 |
| Liberal Democrats | Lesley Clare Stockman Bennett | 301 | 19.84 | +4.34 |
| Green | Rosie Howell | 185 | 12.20 | +5.30 |
| Labour | Peter Neil Baldrey | 96 | 6.33 | +0.23 |
| Majority | | 634 | 41.79 | –14.11 |
| Turnout | | 1,529 | 42.95 | +2.65 |
| Registered electors | | 3,560 | | |
| Conservative hold | | Swing | | |

=== Calne Central ===
Calne Central
| Party | Candidate | Votes | % | ±% |
|---|---|---|---|---|
| Liberal Democrats | Ian Leslie Thorn * | 863 | 54.14 | +2.54 |
| Conservative | Brent Slater | 527 | 33.06 | –5.44 |
| Labour | John Boaler | 124 | 7.78 | –2.12 |
| Green | Lindsay Alexandra Woodman | 80 | 5.02 | N/A |
| Majority | | 336 | 21.08 | +7.98 |
| Turnout | | 1,600 | 42.26 | –0.34 |
| Registered electors | | 3,786 | | |
| Liberal Democrats hold | | Swing | | |

=== Calne Chilvester and Abberd ===
Calne Chilvester and Abberd
| Party | Candidate | Votes | % | ±% |
|---|---|---|---|---|
| Conservative | Tony Trotman * | 574 | 47.01 | –3.39 |
| Liberal Democrats | Robert Matthew Merrick | 332 | 27.19 | –3.61 |
| Labour | Sue Pitman | 179 | 14.66 | –4.14 |
| Green | Daniel Brendan McAuley | 136 | 11.14 | N/A |
| Majority | | 242 | 19.82 | +0.22 |
| Turnout | | 1,232 | 31.90 | –2.50 |
| Registered electors | | 3,862 | | |
| Conservative hold | | Swing | | |

Note: Tony Trotman died in November 2023 and a by-election took place in February 2024

=== Calne North ===
Calne North
| Party | Candidate | Votes | % | ±% |
|---|---|---|---|---|
| Conservative | Tom Rounds * | 480 | 43.44 | –1.96 |
| Liberal Democrats | Glenis Jean Ansell | 386 | 34.93 | –2.67 |
| Labour | Jon Fisher | 178 | 16.11 | –0.89 |
| Green | Arthur John McAuley | 61 | 5.52 | N/A |
| Majority | | 94 | 8.51 | +0.71 |
| Turnout | | 1,119 | 30.33 | –0.47 |
| Registered electors | | 3,689 | | |
| Conservative hold | | Swing | | |

=== Calne Rural ===
Calne Rural
| Party | Candidate | Votes | % | ±% |
|---|---|---|---|---|
| Conservative | Ashley O'Neill * | 1,199 | 60.56 | –7.64 |
| Liberal Democrats | Declan Alexander William Boore | 286 | 14.44 | –7.76 |
| Labour | John Francis Barnes | 270 | 13.64 | +4.04 |
| Green | Hugh Pilcher-Clayton | 225 | 11.36 | N/A |
| Majority | | 913 | 46.11 | +0.31 |
| Turnout | | 1,990 | 47.91 | +2.41 |
| Registered electors | | 4,154 | | |
| Conservative hold | | Swing | | |

=== Calne South ===
Calne South
| Party | Candidate | Votes | % | ±% |
|---|---|---|---|---|
| Liberal Democrats | Sam Pearce-Kearney | 938 | 59.40 | N/A |
| Conservative | Alan Kenneth Hill * | 592 | 37.49 | N/A |
| Labour | Tom Morris | 49 | 3.10 | N/A |
| Majority | | 346 | 21.91 | N/A |
| Turnout | | 1,588 | 45.50 | N/A |
| Registered electors | | 3,490 | | |
| Liberal Democrats win (new seat) | | | | |

=== Chippenham Cepen Park and Derriads ===
Chippenham Cepen Park and Derriads
| Party | Candidate | Votes | % | ±% |
|---|---|---|---|---|
| Conservative | Nic Puntis | 701 | 45.34 | –22.66 |
| Independent | James George Bradbury | 440 | 28.46 | N/A |
| Liberal Democrats | Edward William Paul Sawyer | 405 | 26.20 | +5.80 |
| Majority | | 261 | 16.88 | –30.42 |
| Turnout | | 1,557 | 37.95 | –1.75 |
| Registered electors | | 4,103 | | |
| Conservative hold | | Swing | | |

=== Chippenham Cepen Park and Hunters Moon ===
Chippenham Cepen Park and Hunters Moon
| Party | Candidate | Votes | % | ±% |
|---|---|---|---|---|
| Conservative | Peter John Hutton * | 744 | 52.84 | N/A |
| Independent | Myla Annaleise Watts | 337 | 23.93 | N/A |
| Liberal Democrats | George Patrick Simmonds | 327 | 23.22 | N/A |
| Majority | | 407 | 28.91 | N/A |
| Turnout | | 1,417 | 40.27 | N/A |
| Registered electors | | 3,519 | | |
| Conservative win (new seat) | | | | |

=== Chippenham Hardenhuish ===
Chippenham Hardenhuish
| Party | Candidate | Votes | % | ±% |
|---|---|---|---|---|
| Liberal Democrats | Kathryn Farrah Macdermid | 665 | 51.51 | +7.21 |
| Conservative | Robert John Bradfield | 374 | 28.97 | –17.73 |
| Independent | Peter James Ludlow Cousins | 252 | 19.52 | N/A |
| Majority | | 291 | 22.54 | N/A |
| Turnout | | 1,306 | 39.50 | –2.00 |
| Registered electors | | 3,306 | | |
| Liberal Democrats gain from Conservative | | Swing | | |

=== Chippenham Hardens and Central ===
Chippenham Hardens and Central
| Party | Candidate | Votes | % | ±% |
|---|---|---|---|---|
| Liberal Democrats | Liz Alstrom | 935 | 57.01 | N/A |
| Conservative | Ken Oxley | 414 | 25.24 | N/A |
| Independent | Matthew Carl Short | 291 | 17.74 | N/A |
| Majority | | 521 | 31.77 | N/A |
| Turnout | | 1,669 | 41.71 | N/A |
| Registered electors | | 4,001 | | |
| Liberal Democrats win (new seat) | | | | |

=== Chippenham Lowden and Rowden ===
Chippenham Lowden and Rowden
| Party | Candidate | Votes | % | ±% |
|---|---|---|---|---|
| Liberal Democrats | Ross Henning * | 444 | 39.96 | –0.14 |
| Independent | David Keith Poole | 370 | 33.30 | +3.10 |
| Conservative | Peter Graham Wragg | 297 | 26.73 | –2.97 |
| Majority | | 74 | 6.67 | –3.13 |
| Turnout | | 1,118 | 43.33 | +6.33 |
| Registered electors | | 2,580 | | |
| Liberal Democrats hold | | Swing | | |

=== Chippenham Monkton ===
Chippenham Monkton
| Party | Candidate | Votes | % | ±% |
|---|---|---|---|---|
| Independent | Nick Murry * | 1,062 | 81.76 | +19.36 |
| Conservative | Jackie Plumb | 212 | 16.32 | –2.68 |
| No party description | Jonathan Jeffrey Melvyne Branton | 25 | 1.92 | N/A |
| Majority | | 850 | 65.43 | |
| Turnout | | 1,317 | 58.69 | |
| Registered electors | | 2,244 | | |
| Independent hold | | Swing | | |

=== Chippenham Pewsham ===
Chippenham Pewsham
| Party | Candidate | Votes | % | ±% |
|---|---|---|---|---|
| Liberal Democrats | Clare Morforwyn Cape * | 797 | 56.01 | +4.51 |
| Conservative | Richard Bambury | 502 | 35.28 | –13.22 |
| Independent | Geoff Brewer | 124 | 8.71 | N/A |
| Majority | | 295 | 20.73 | +17.73 |
| Turnout | | 1,429 | 37.17 | –4.83 |
| Registered electors | | 3,845 | | |
| Liberal Democrats hold | | Swing | | |

=== Chippenham Sheldon ===
Chippenham Sheldon
| Party | Candidate | Votes | % | ±% |
|---|---|---|---|---|
| Liberal Democrats | Adrian David Foster | 433 | 34.89 | N/A |
| Conservative | Teresa Hutton | 365 | 29.41 | N/A |
| Independent | Andy Phillips * | 288 | 23.21 | N/A |
| Independent | Adrian Richard Estcourt Temple-Brown | 155 | 12.49 | N/A |
| Majority | | 68 | 5.48 | N/A |
| Turnout | | 1,250 | 30.80 | N/A |
| Registered electors | | 4,059 | | |
| Liberal Democrats win (new seat) | | | | |

=== Corsham Ladbrook ===
Corsham Ladbrook
| Party | Candidate | Votes | % | ±% |
|---|---|---|---|---|
| Liberal Democrats | Ruth Mary Catherine Hopkinson * | 1,087 | 59.63 | N/A |
| Conservative | Ray Le-Var | 580 | 31.82 | N/A |
| Green | Phillip Christopher Chamberlain | 156 | 8.56 | N/A |
| Majority | | 507 | 27.81 | N/A |
| Turnout | | 1,829 | 43.91 | N/A |
| Registered electors | | 4,165 | | |
| Liberal Democrats win (new seat) | | | | |

=== Corsham Pickwick ===
Corsham Pickwick
| Party | Candidate | Votes | % | ±% |
|---|---|---|---|---|
| Liberal Democrats | Helen Clare Belcher | 885 | 51.04 | +0.74 |
| Conservative | Alun Rolfe Crockford | 678 | 39.10 | –1.1 |
| Labour | Stephanie Michelle Driver | 136 | 7.84 | –1.66 |
| No party description | Tina Maria Johnston | 35 | 2.02 | N/A |
| Majority | | 207 | 11.94 | +1.84 |
| Turnout | | 1,745 | 42.53 | +2.73 |
| Registered electors | | 4,103 | | |
| Liberal Democrats hold | | Swing | | |

=== Corsham Without ===
Corsham Without
| Party | Candidate | Votes | % | ±% |
|---|---|---|---|---|
| Liberal Democrats | Derek Charles Walters | 777 | 47.18 | N/A |
| Conservative | Patrick Holliday | 703 | 42.68 | N/A |
| Green | Declan Baseley | 167 | 10.14 | N/A |
| Majority | | 74 | 4.49 | N/A |
| Turnout | | 1,654 | 44.81 | N/A |
| Registered electors | | 3,691 | | |
| Liberal Democrats win (new seat) | | | | |

=== Cricklade and Latton ===
Cricklade and Latton
| Party | Candidate | Votes | % | ±% |
|---|---|---|---|---|
| Liberal Democrats | Bob Jones * | 1,274 | 62.15 | +13.35 |
| Conservative | Luke Lawrence Jowett | 776 | 37.85 | –8.85 |
| Majority | | 498 | 24.29 | +22.19 |
| Turnout | | 2,078 | 52.49 | +3.79 |
| Registered electors | | 3,959 | | |
| Liberal Democrats hold | | Swing | | |

Note: Bob Jones died in January 2024 and a by-election took place in March 2024.

=== Devizes East ===
Devizes East
| Party | Candidate | Votes | % | ±% |
|---|---|---|---|---|
| Conservative | Kelvin James Nash | 779 | 50.88 | +8.08 |
| Liberal Democrats | Angelika Davey | 338 | 22.08 | +5.08 |
| Labour | Noël Woolrych | 256 | 16.72 | +1.08 |
| Green | Samantha Jane Drury Shore | 158 | 10.32 | N/A |
| Majority | | 441 | 28.80 | +10.60 |
| Turnout | | 1,547 | 36.35 | –0.35 |
| Registered electors | | 4,256 | | |
| Conservative hold | | Swing | | |

=== Devizes North ===
Devizes North
| Party | Candidate | Votes | % | ±% |
|---|---|---|---|---|
| Conservative | Iain Wallis | 558 | 42.56 | –4.24 |
| Independent | Ian Richard Porter Hopkins | 295 | 22.50 | N/A |
| Labour | Vincent Paul McNamara | 180 | 13.73 | –1.33 |
| Green | James Allen | 159 | 12.13 | –1.67 |
| Liberal Democrats | David James Kinnard | 119 | 9.08 | N/A |
| Majority | | 263 | 20.06 | –0.46 |
| Turnout | | 1,326 | 39.71 | +1.01 |
| Registered electors | | 3,339 | | |
| Conservative hold | | Swing | | |

=== Devizes Rural West ===
Devizes Rural West
| Party | Candidate | Votes | % | ±% |
|---|---|---|---|---|
| Conservative | Tamara Reay | 1,065 | 60.51 | N/A |
| Green | Margaret Ursula Green | 560 | 31.82 | N/A |
| Labour | Daisy Gül Alice Bostanli | 135 | 7.67 | N/A |
| Majority | | 505 | 28.69 | N/A |
| Turnout | | 1,776 | 50.27 | N/A |
| Registered electors | | 3,533 | | |
| Conservative win (new seat) | | | | |

=== Devizes South ===
Devizes South
| Party | Candidate | Votes | % | ±% |
|---|---|---|---|---|
| Conservative | Simon David Jacobs * | 879 | 51.43 | N/A |
| Labour | Catherine Amelia Brown | 342 | 20.01 | N/A |
| Liberal Democrats | Alan Charles Rankin | 303 | 17.73 | N/A |
| Green | Yvonne Alice Forsey | 185 | 10.83 | N/A |
| Majority | | 537 | 31.42 | N/A |
| Turnout | | 1,734 | 45.37 | N/A |
| Registered electors | | 3,822 | | |
| Conservative win (new seat) | | | | |

=== Downton and Ebble Valley ===
Downton and Ebble Valley
| Party | Candidate | Votes | % | ±% |
|---|---|---|---|---|
| Conservative | Richard John Clewer * | 983 | 60.12 | –4.58 |
| Labour | Stephanie Lorraine Jalland | 244 | 14.92 | +2.02 |
| Green | Richard Anthony Allam | 227 | 13.88 | –0.42 |
| Liberal Democrats | John Phillip Edrich | 181 | 11.07 | +2.87 |
| Majority | | 739 | 45.20 | –5.1 |
| Turnout | | 1,643 | 41.35 | +2.35 |
| Registered electors | | 3,973 | | |
| Conservative hold | | Swing | | |

=== Durrington ===
Durrington
| Party | Candidate | Votes | % | ±% |
|---|---|---|---|---|
| Independent | Graham Wright * | 1,322 | 88.13 | N/A |
| Conservative | Carrie Moore | 178 | 11.87 | N/A |
| Majority | | 1,144 | 76.27 | N/A |
| Turnout | | 1,515 | 41.75 | N/A |
| Registered electors | | 3,629 | | |
| Independent win (new seat) | | | | |

=== Ethandune ===
Ethandune
| Party | Candidate | Votes | % | ±% |
|---|---|---|---|---|
| Conservative | Suzanne Grahem Wickham * | 1,077 | 66.60 | –5.20 |
| Green | Val Jarvis | 334 | 20.66 | N/A |
| Liberal Democrats | Bob Brice | 206 | 12.74 | –15.46 |
| Majority | | 743 | 19.98 | –23.12 |
| Turnout | | 1,631 | 43.69 | +2.39 |
| Registered electors | | 3,733 | | |
| Conservative hold | | Swing | | |

Note: Suzanne Grahem Wickham had previously held the seat for the Conservatives in a 2019 by-election.

=== Fovant and Chalke Valley ===
Fovant and Chalke Valley
| Party | Candidate | Votes | % | ±% |
|---|---|---|---|---|
| Conservative | Nabil Habib Najjar | 1,060 | 64.83 | –0.17 |
| Green | Richard Lewis Ecclestone | 316 | 19.33 | N/A |
| Liberal Democrats | James Campbell Robertson | 259 | 15.84 | +3.44 |
| Majority | | 744 | 45.50 | +3.40 |
| Turnout | | 1,653 | 44.99 | +0.89 |
| Registered electors | | 3,674 | | |
| Conservative hold | | Swing | | |

=== Hilperton ===
Hilperton
| Party | Candidate | Votes | % | ±% |
|---|---|---|---|---|
| Independent | Ernie Clark * | 1,187 | 77.99 | –1.71 |
| Conservative | Jonathan Peter Davies | 191 | 12.55 | +0.25 |
| Green | Sarah Kearney | 144 | 9.46 | N/A |
| Majority | | 996 | 65.44 | –1.56 |
| Turnout | | 1,525 | 44.66 | +1.36 |
| Registered electors | | 3,415 | | |
| Independent hold | | Swing | | |

=== Holt ===
Holt
| Party | Candidate | Votes | % | ±% |
|---|---|---|---|---|
| Liberal Democrats | Trevor William Carbin * | 995 | 59.19 | N/A |
| Conservative | Pam Hyde | 543 | 32.30 | N/A |
| Green | David Adrian McQueen | 143 | 8.51 | N/A |
| Majority | | 452 | 26.89 | N/A |
| Turnout | | 1,686 | 46.45 | N/A |
| Registered electors | | 3,630 | | |
| Liberal Democrats win (new seat) | | | | |

=== Kington ===
Kington
| Party | Candidate | Votes | % | ±% |
|---|---|---|---|---|
| Conservative | Howard Greenman * | 1,157 | 61.51 | –7.69 |
| Liberal Democrats | Ros Edwards | 287 | 15.26 | –5.64 |
| Labour | John Andrew Foster | 222 | 11.80 | +1.9 |
| Green | Peter Colegate | 215 | 11.43 | N/A |
| Majority | | 870 | 46.25 | –2.05 |
| Turnout | | 1,896 | 47.07 | –1.67 |
| Registered electors | | 4,028 | | |
| Conservative hold | | Swing | | |

=== Laverstock ===
Laverstock
| Party | Candidate | Votes | % | ±% |
|---|---|---|---|---|
| Labour | Ian David McLennan * | 864 | 42.13 | N/A |
| Conservative | Laura Elizabeth Jones | 776 | 37.84 | N/A |
| Independent | Hilary Anne Davidson | 225 | 10.97 | N/A |
| Liberal Democrats | Christine Barbara Flynn | 105 | 5.12 | N/A |
| Green | Joseph Lister Bossano | 81 | 3.95 | N/A |
| Majority | | 88 | 4.29 | N/A |
| Turnout | | 2,068 | 47.43 | N/A |
| Registered electors | | 4,360 | | |
| Labour win (new seat) | | | | |

=== Ludgershall North and Rural ===
Ludgershall North and Rural
| Party | Candidate | Votes | % | ±% |
|---|---|---|---|---|
| Conservative | Christopher Michael Williams * | 849 | 69.31 | N/A |
| Green | Emma Jane Clarissa Dawnay | 190 | 15.51 | N/A |
| Liberal Democrats | Tom de Bruijn | 186 | 15.18 | N/A |
| Majority | | 659 | 53.80 | N/A |
| Turnout | | 1,244 | 34.30 | N/A |
| Registered electors | | 3,627 | | |
| Conservative win (new seat) | | | | |

=== Lyneham ===
Lyneham
| Party | Candidate | Votes | % | ±% |
|---|---|---|---|---|
| Conservative | Allison Mary Bucknell * | 1,269 | 79.41 | +2.41 |
| Green | Oliver Lavery | 205 | 12.83 | N/A |
| No party description | James Sidney William Elford | 124 | 7.76 | N/A |
| Majority | | 1,064 | 66.58 | +7.58 |
| Turnout | | 1,608 | 38.92 | +0.22 |
| Registered electors | | 4,132 | | |
| Conservative hold | | Swing | | |

=== Malmesbury ===
Malmesbury
| Party | Candidate | Votes | % | ±% |
|---|---|---|---|---|
| Liberal Democrats | Gavin Grant * | 1,092 | 57.23 | +3.33 |
| Conservative | Ray Sanderson | 595 | 31.18 | –8.62 |
| Labour Co-op | Glyn Davies | 221 | 11.58 | +5.28 |
| Majority | | 497 | 26.05 | +12.05 |
| Turnout | | 1,931 | 43.88 | +0.78 |
| Registered electors | | 4,401 | | |
| Liberal Democrats hold | | Swing | | |

=== Marlborough East ===
Marlborough East
| Party | Candidate | Votes | % | ±% |
|---|---|---|---|---|
| Conservative | Caroline Susan Thomas | 804 | 53.78 | –6.72 |
| Liberal Democrats | Kymee Cleasby | 366 | 24.48 | +1.88 |
| Labour | Katherine Grace Davis | 172 | 11.51 | –5.39 |
| Green | Ruth Mary Lamdin | 153 | 10.23 | N/A |
| Majority | | 438 | 29.30 | –8.40 |
| Turnout | | 1,509 | 37.56 | +0.46 |
| Registered electors | | 4,018 | | |
| Conservative hold | | Swing | | |

=== Marlborough West ===
Marlborough West
| Party | Candidate | Votes | % | ±% |
|---|---|---|---|---|
| Conservative | Jane Frances Davies * | 1,156 | 63.17 | N/A |
| Liberal Democrats | Jo Waltham | 323 | 17.65 | N/A |
| Green | Mark Purse | 178 | 9.73 | N/A |
| Labour | Harvey Neil James Bishop | 173 | 9.45 | N/A |
| Majority | | 833 | 45.52 | N/A |
| Turnout | | 1,850 | 42.85 | N/A |
| Registered electors | | 4,317 | | |
| Conservative win (new seat) | | | | |

=== Melksham East ===
Melksham East
| Party | Candidate | Votes | % | ±% |
|---|---|---|---|---|
| Conservative | Mike Sankey | 335 | 37.18 | N/A |
| Liberal Democrats | Nigel Paul White | 219 | 24.31 | N/A |
| Independent | Louisa Lucy Lewis | 192 | 21.31 | N/A |
| Independent | Vanessa Fiorelli | 88 | 9.77 | N/A |
| Independent | Ryan James Clarke | 67 | 7.44 | N/A |
| Majority | | 116 | 12.87 | N/A |
| Turnout | | 908 | 26.53 | N/A |
| Registered electors | | 3,423 | | |
| Conservative win (new seat) | | | | |

=== Melksham Forest ===
Melksham Forest
| Party | Candidate | Votes | % | ±% |
|---|---|---|---|---|
| Independent | Jack Oatley | 519 | 40.20 | N/A |
| Liberal Democrats | Pat Aves * | 397 | 30.75 | N/A |
| Conservative | Claire Elizabeth Forgacs | 375 | 29.05 | N/A |
| Majority | | 122 | 9.45 | N/A |
| Turnout | | 1,305 | 33.22 | N/A |
| Registered electors | | 3,928 | | |
| Independent win (new seat) | | | | |

=== Melksham South ===
Melksham South
| Party | Candidate | Votes | % | ±% |
|---|---|---|---|---|
| Independent | Jon Hubbard * | 670 | 48.83 | + 48.83 |
| Conservative | Jacqui Crundell | 429 | 31.27 | –0.43 |
| Liberal Democrats | Terri Welch | 173 | 12.61 | − 55.79 |
| Green | Dominic Francocci | 100 | 7.29 | + 7.29 |
| Majority | | 241 | 17.57 | N/A |
| Turnout | | 1,388 | 36.14 | –2.46 |
| Registered electors | | 3,841 | | |
| Independent gain from Liberal Democrats | | Swing | | |

=== Melksham Without North and Shurnhold ===
Melksham Without North and Shurnhold
| Party | Candidate | Votes | % | ±% |
|---|---|---|---|---|
| Conservative | Phil Alford * | 890 | 64.26 | N/A |
| Liberal Democrats | Kevin Ian Cottrell | 263 | 18.99 | N/A |
| Independent | Saffi Rabey | 232 | 16.75 | N/A |
| Majority | | 627 | 45.27 | N/A |
| Turnout | | 1,399 | 38.43 | N/A |
| Registered electors | | 3,640 | | |
| Conservative win (new seat) | | | | |

=== Melksham Without West and Rural ===
Melksham Without West and Rural
| Party | Candidate | Votes | % | ±% |
|---|---|---|---|---|
| Conservative | Jonathon Seed * | 870 | 55.98 | N/A |
| Liberal Democrats | Syrie Katherine Gregory-Wood | 279 | 17.95 | N/A |
| Green | Sue Tweedie | 236 | 15.19 | N/A |
| Labour | Sean Lakshman William McWhinnie | 169 | 10.88 | N/A |
| Majority | | 591 | 38.03 | N/A |
| Turnout | | 1,567 | 45.21 | N/A |
| Registered electors | | 3,466 | | |
| Conservative win (new seat) | | | | |

=== Mere ===
Mere
| Party | Candidate | Votes | % | ±% |
|---|---|---|---|---|
| Independent | George Edwin Jeans * | 1,332 | 72.71 | +5.81 |
| Conservative | Timothy Stuart Pollard | 244 | 13.32 | –6.58 |
| Labour | John Anthony Jordan | 177 | 9.66 | –3.54 |
| Green | Cindy Moxham | 79 | 4.31 | N/A |
| Majority | | 1,088 | 59.39 | +12.59 |
| Turnout | | 1,842 | 51.47 | –6.43 |
| Registered electors | | 3,579 | | |
| Independent hold | | Swing | | |

=== Minety ===
Minety
| Party | Candidate | Votes | % | ±% |
|---|---|---|---|---|
| Conservative | Chuck Berry * | 1,217 | 66.87 | –7.43 |
| Liberal Democrats | Liz Lewis | 226 | 12.42 | –6.78 |
| Labour | Steve Butcher | 191 | 10.49 | +3.99 |
| Green | Francesca Elizabeth Vandelli | 186 | 10.22 | N/A |
| Majority | | 991 | 54.45 | –0.45 |
| Turnout | | 1,826 | 47.23 | +7.13 |
| Registered electors | | 3,866 | | |
| Conservative hold | | Swing | | |

=== Nadder Valley ===
Nadder Valley
| Party | Candidate | Votes | % | ±% |
|---|---|---|---|---|
| Conservative | Bridget Anne Wayman * | 1,049 | 65.28 | N/A |
| Green | Tean Jane Mitchell | 308 | 19.17 | N/A |
| Liberal Democrats | Jill Caudle | 250 | 15.56 | N/A |
| Majority | | 741 | 46.11 | N/A |
| Turnout | | 1,626 | 44.55 | N/A |
| Registered electors | | 3,650 | | |
| Conservative win (new seat) | | | | |

=== Old Sarum and Lower Bourne Valley ===
Old Sarum and Lower Bourne Valley
| Party | Candidate | Votes | % | ±% |
|---|---|---|---|---|
| Conservative | Andrew Peter Oliver | 743 | 47.48 | N/A |
| Labour | Sheena King | 504 | 32.20 | N/A |
| Liberal Democrats | Sam Foster | 164 | 10.48 | N/A |
| Green | Jacqui Bobby | 154 | 9.84 | N/A |
| Majority | | 239 | 15.27 | N/A |
| Turnout | | 1,581 | 36.15 | N/A |
| Registered electors | | 4,374 | | |
| Conservative win (new seat) | | | | |

=== Pewsey ===
Pewsey
| Party | Candidate | Votes | % | ±% |
|---|---|---|---|---|
| Conservative | Jerry Kunkler * | 1,093 | 59.24 | –12.86 |
| Labour | Rachel Katharine Ross | 297 | 16.10 | +4.8 |
| Independent | Alan Richard Coxon | 275 | 14.91 | N/A |
| Green | Catherine Anne Read | 104 | 5.64 | N/A |
| Liberal Democrats | Jessie Irene Thorn | 76 | 4.12 | –12.48 |
| Majority | | 796 | 43.14 | –12.06 |
| Turnout | | 1,854 | 47.18 | +7.78 |
| Registered electors | | 3,930 | | |
| Conservative hold | | Swing | | |

=== Pewsey Vale East ===
Pewsey Vale East
| Party | Candidate | Votes | % | ±% |
|---|---|---|---|---|
| Conservative | Stuart John Kennedy Wheeler * | 1,160 | 66.36 | N/A |
| Green | Chris Larkin | 307 | 17.56 | N/A |
| Liberal Democrats | Parvis Jamieson | 281 | 16.08 | N/A |
| Majority | | 853 | 48.80 | N/A |
| Turnout | | 1,759 | 40.32 | N/A |
| Registered electors | | 4,363 | | |
| Conservative win (new seat) | | | | |

Note: Stuart Wheeler was elected in 2017 in Burbage and The Bedwyns

=== Pewsey Vale West ===
Pewsey Vale West
| Party | Candidate | Votes | % | ±% |
|---|---|---|---|---|
| Conservative | Paul Oatway * | 1,136 | 68.15 | N/A |
| Green | Brian Roy Utton | 313 | 18.78 | N/A |
| Liberal Democrats | Daniel Alexander Excell-Smith | 218 | 13.08 | N/A |
| Majority | | 823 | 49.37 | N/A |
| Turnout | | 1,684 | 41.59 | N/A |
| Registered electors | | 4,049 | | |
| Conservative win (new seat) | | | | |

Note: Paul Oatway was elected in 2017 in Pewsey Vale

=== Purton ===
Purton
| Party | Candidate | Votes | % | ±% |
|---|---|---|---|---|
| Conservative | Jacqui Lay * | 1,097 | 68.91 | –5.79 |
| Liberal Democrats | Joanne Clarke | 227 | 14.26 | –11.04 |
| Labour | Steve Wheeler | 157 | 9.86 | N/A |
| Green | Cathy Limbrick | 111 | 6.97 | N/A |
| Majority | | 870 | 54.65 | +5.55 |
| Turnout | | 1,603 | 32.33 | +0.13 |
| Registered electors | | 4,959 | | |
| Conservative hold | | Swing | | |

=== Redlynch and Landford ===
Redlynch and Landford
| Party | Candidate | Votes | % | ±% |
|---|---|---|---|---|
| Conservative | Zoë Diana Clewer | 991 | 58.02 | –8.48 |
| Liberal Democrats | Martin James Rosell | 294 | 17.21 | –3.39 |
| Green | Andrew Gordon Carter | 249 | 14.58 | N/A |
| Labour Co-op | Finn Anderson | 174 | 10.19 | –2.71 |
| Majority | | 697 | 40.81 | –5.09 |
| Turnout | | 1,712 | 46.10 | +5.10 |
| Registered electors | | 3,714 | | |
| Conservative hold | | Swing | | |

=== Royal Wootton Bassett East ===
Royal Wootton Bassett East
| Party | Candidate | Votes | % | ±% |
|---|---|---|---|---|
| Conservative | Steve Bucknell | 981 | 64.12 | –5.68 |
| Liberal Democrats | Fiona Geraldine Holness | 339 | 22.16 | +3.56 |
| Labour | Stuart Andrew Dark | 122 | 7.97 | –3.63 |
| Green | Karen Louise Crawford | 88 | 5.75 | N/A |
| Majority | | 642 | 41.96 | –8.94 |
| Turnout | | 1,547 | 41.30 | +2.10 |
| Registered electors | | 3,746 | | |
| Conservative hold | | Swing | | |

=== Royal Wootton Bassett North ===
Royal Wootton Bassett North
| Party | Candidate | Votes | % | ±% |
|---|---|---|---|---|
| Conservative | Mary Champion * | 770 | 49.26 | –3.34 |
| Liberal Democrats | Andrew Matthews | 578 | 36.98 | +0.88 |
| Labour | Ron Bardwell | 133 | 8.51 | –2.79 |
| Green | Tony Clark | 82 | 5.25 | N/A |
| Majority | | 192 | 12.28 | –4.22 |
| Turnout | | 1,575 | 37.23 | –2.27 |
| Registered electors | | 4,230 | | |
| Conservative hold | | Swing | | |

=== Royal Wootton Bassett South and West ===
Royal Wootton Bassett South and West
| Party | Candidate | Votes | % | ±% |
|---|---|---|---|---|
| Liberal Democrats | David Michael Bowler | 938 | 47.14 | N/A |
| Conservative | Sue Hughes | 893 | 44.87 | N/A |
| Labour | Heather Denise Reilly-Edwards | 159 | 7.99 | N/A |
| Majority | | 46 | 2.31 | N/A |
| Turnout | | 2,009 | 44.92 | N/A |
| Registered electors | | 4,472 | | |
| Liberal Democrats win (new seat) | | | | |

=== Salisbury Bemerton Heath ===
Salisbury Bemerton Heath
| Party | Candidate | Votes | % | ±% |
|---|---|---|---|---|
| Labour | Caroline Susan Corbin | 392 | 48.22 | N/A |
| Conservative | Ed Rimmer | 293 | 36.04 | N/A |
| Liberal Democrats | Richard Andrew Johnson | 92 | 11.32 | N/A |
| Green | James Lee Doyle | 36 | 4.43 | N/A |
| Majority | | 99 | 12.18 | N/A |
| Turnout | | 821 | 28.28 | N/A |
| Registered electors | | 2,903 | | |
| Labour win (new seat) | | | | |

=== Salisbury Fisherton and Bemerton Village ===
Salisbury Fisherton and Bemerton Village
| Party | Candidate | Votes | % | ±% |
|---|---|---|---|---|
| Labour | Ricky Rogers * | 618 | 38.36 | +4.06 |
| Conservative | Jeremy Robert Lloyd Nettle | 552 | 34.26 | +4.76 |
| Green | Alex Raws | 270 | 16.76 | +9.36 |
| Liberal Democrats | Harry Ashcroft | 110 | 6.83 | –8.27 |
| UKIP | Pat Conlon | 61 | 3.79 | +0.19 |
| Majority | | 66 | 4.10 | –0.80 |
| Turnout | | 1,632 | 38.75 | –1.15 |
| Registered electors | | 4,212 | | |
| Labour hold | | Swing | | |

=== Salisbury Harnham East ===
Salisbury Harnham East
| Party | Candidate | Votes | % | ±% |
|---|---|---|---|---|
| Conservative | Sven Hocking * | 684 | 38.54 | N/A |
| Labour | Ian Robert Tomes | 439 | 24.73 | N/A |
| Liberal Democrats | Greg Condliffe | 406 | 22.87 | N/A |
| Green | Ian Rylott Dixon | 246 | 13.86 | N/A |
| Majority | | 245 | 13.80 | N/A |
| Turnout | | 1,790 | 45.83 | N/A |
| Registered electors | | 3,906 | | |
| Conservative win (new seat) | | | | |

=== Salisbury Harnham West ===
Salisbury Harnham West
| Party | Candidate | Votes | % | ±% |
|---|---|---|---|---|
| Liberal Democrats | Brian Edward Dalton * | 737 | 44.42 | N/A |
| Conservative | Bently Louis Fforde Creswell | 498 | 30.02 | N/A |
| Independent | Frances Mary Patricia Howard | 161 | 9.70 | N/A |
| Green | Sarah Prinsloo | 160 | 9.64 | N/A |
| Labour | Colin Skelton | 103 | 6.21 | N/A |
| Majority | | 239 | 14.41 | N/A |
| Turnout | | 1,672 | 50.45 | N/A |
| Registered electors | | 3,314 | | |
| Liberal Democrats win (new seat) | | | | |

=== Salisbury Milford ===
Salisbury Milford
| Party | Candidate | Votes | % | ±% |
|---|---|---|---|---|
| Conservative | Charles Samuel McGrath | 718 | 40.98 | N/A |
| Liberal Democrats | Alan Halliday Bayliss | 492 | 28.08 | N/A |
| Labour | Frances Theresa West | 305 | 17.41 | N/A |
| Green | Sara Jayne Taylor | 237 | 13.53 | N/A |
| Majority | | 226 | 12.90 | N/A |
| Turnout | | 1,772 | 41.43 | N/A |
| Registered electors | | 4,277 | | |
| Conservative win (new seat) | | | | |

=== Salisbury St Edmund's ===
Salisbury St Edmund's
| Party | Candidate | Votes | % | ±% |
|---|---|---|---|---|
| Liberal Democrats | Paul William Leslie Sample | 1,087 | 53.52 | N/A |
| Conservative | Atiqul Hoque * | 525 | 25.85 | N/A |
| Green | Rick Page | 238 | 11.72 | N/A |
| Labour | Finbarr Sheehan | 181 | 8.91 | N/A |
| Majority | | 562 | 27.67 | N/A |
| Turnout | | 2,051 | 53.18 | N/A |
| Registered electors | | 3,857 | | |
| Liberal Democrats win (new seat) | | | | |

=== Salisbury St Francis and Stratford ===
Salisbury St Francis and Stratford
| Party | Candidate | Votes | % | ±% |
|---|---|---|---|---|
| Conservative | Mark Jonathan Lamdin McClelland | 858 | 43.53 | –5.87 |
| Labour | John Arthur Wells | 534 | 27.09 | +19.09 |
| Liberal Democrats | Julian James Sargood Ellis | 318 | 16.13 | –16.27 |
| Green | Richard Bolton | 261 | 13.24 | +3.04 |
| Majority | | 324 | 16.44 | –0.56 |
| Turnout | | 1,992 | 49.92 | +4.92 |
| Registered electors | | 3,990 | | |
| Conservative hold | | Swing | | |

=== Salisbury St Paul's ===
Salisbury St Paul's
| Party | Candidate | Votes | % | ±% |
|---|---|---|---|---|
| Conservative | Mary Elsie Webb | 461 | 32.26 | –12.44 |
| Liberal Democrats | Samuel Adam George Charleston | 429 | 30.02 | +7.72 |
| Labour | Paul Michael Clegg | 312 | 21.83 | +1.13 |
| Green | Cathy Thomas | 227 | 15.89 | +3.49 |
| Majority | | 32 | 2.24 | –20.06 |
| Turnout | | 1,440 | 37.10 | –2.20 |
| Registered electors | | 3,881 | | |
| Conservative hold | | Swing | | |

Note: Mary Webb died in August 2022, and a by-election took place in November 2022

=== Sherston ===
Sherston
| Party | Candidate | Votes | % | ±% |
|---|---|---|---|---|
| Liberal Democrats | Martin Fausing Smith | 979 | 49.27 | +24.37 |
| Conservative | Mike Jennings | 885 | 44.54 | –24.06 |
| Labour | Emma Lee Whatley | 123 | 6.19 | –0.21 |
| Majority | | 94 | 4.93 | N/A |
| Turnout | | 2,005 | 50.29 | +8.29 |
| Registered electors | | 3,987 | | |
| Liberal Democrats gain from Conservative | | Swing | | |

=== Southwick ===
Southwick
| Party | Candidate | Votes | % | ±% |
|---|---|---|---|---|
| Conservative | Horace John Prickett * | 1,029 | 72.31 | –9.19 |
| Liberal Democrats | John Richard Marsden | 201 | 14.13 | –4.37 |
| Green | Peter William Gregory | 193 | 13.56 | N/A |
| Majority | | 828 | 58.19 | –4.21 |
| Turnout | | 1,445 | 43.26 | +3.36 |
| Registered electors | | 3,340 | | |
| Conservative hold | | Swing | | |

=== The Lavingtons ===
The Lavingtons
| Party | Candidate | Votes | % | ±% |
|---|---|---|---|---|
| Conservative | Dominic Rafael Miguel Muns | 935 | 59.55 | N/A |
| Green | Diane Mary Gilpin | 322 | 20.51 | N/A |
| Liberal Democrats | Andrew Norman Jenkinson | 193 | 12.29 | N/A |
| Labour | Matthew James Bowman Lee | 120 | 7.64 | N/A |
| Majority | | 613 | 39.04 | N/A |
| Turnout | | 1,587 | 43.82 | N/A |
| Registered electors | | 3,622 | | |
| Conservative win (new seat) | | | | |

=== Tidworth East and Ludgershall South ===
Tidworth East and Ludgershall South
| Party | Candidate | Votes | % | ±% |
|---|---|---|---|---|
| Conservative | Anthony Kenneth John Pickernell | 555 | 69.72 | N/A |
| Labour | David Wright | 148 | 18.59 | N/A |
| Green | Theresa Mary Thornton | 93 | 11.68 | N/A |
| Majority | | 407 | 51.13 | N/A |
| Turnout | | 798 | 19.35 | N/A |
| Registered electors | | 4,124 | | |
| Conservative win (new seat) | | | | |

=== Tidworth North and West ===
Tidworth North and West
| Party | Candidate | Votes | % | ±% |
|---|---|---|---|---|
| Conservative | Mark Connolly * | 548 | 78.06 | N/A |
| Labour | Abe Michael Terry Allen | 154 | 21.94 | N/A |
| Majority | | 394 | 56.13 | N/A |
| Turnout | | 716 | 18.24 | N/A |
| Registered electors | | 3,926 | | |
| Conservative win (new seat) | | | | |

Note: Mark Connolly had been elected in 2017 for the previous seat called Tidworth.

=== Till Valley ===
Till Valley
| Party | Candidate | Votes | % | ±% |
|---|---|---|---|---|
| Conservative | Kevin Stuart Daley * | 1,038 | 57.80 | N/A |
| Liberal Democrats | Alexandra Ròisin Ginn | 543 | 30.23 | N/A |
| Green | Teresa Jane Fallon | 215 | 11.97 | N/A |
| Majority | | 495 | 27.56 | N/A |
| Turnout | | 1,804 | 44.14 | N/A |
| Registered electors | | 4,087 | | |
| Conservative win (new seat) | | | | |

Note: Kevin Daley had held the seat of Till and Wylye Valley in a 2020 by-election.

=== Tisbury ===
Tisbury
| Party | Candidate | Votes | % | ±% |
|---|---|---|---|---|
| Liberal Democrats | Nick Errington | 793 | 47.60 | +22.70 |
| Conservative | Tony Deane * | 563 | 33.79 | –28.01 |
| Green | Julie Elizabeth Phillips | 310 | 18.61 | +5.31 |
| Majority | | 230 | 13.81 | N/A |
| Turnout | | 1,676 | 45.56 | +7.16 |
| Registered electors | | 3,679 | | |
| Liberal Democrats gain from Conservative | | Swing | | |

=== Trowbridge Adcroft ===
Trowbridge Adcroft
| Party | Candidate | Votes | % | ±% |
|---|---|---|---|---|
| Conservative | Edward Kirk * | 716 | 48.58 | +5.88 |
| Liberal Democrats | Nick Blakemore | 550 | 37.31 | –2.09 |
| Labour | Anthony Roderick Mansfield | 134 | 9.09 | –8.81 |
| Green | Rosie Buck | 74 | 5.02 | N/A |
| Majority | | 166 | 11.26 | +7.96 |
| Turnout | | 1,485 | 35.64 | +4.14 |
| Registered electors | | 4,167 | | |
| Conservative hold | | Swing | | |

=== Trowbridge Central ===
Trowbridge Central
| Party | Candidate | Votes | % | ±% |
|---|---|---|---|---|
| Liberal Democrats | Stewart Martin Palmen * | 579 | 40.86 | –1.74 |
| Conservative | Paul Anthony Jubbie | 414 | 29.22 | –5.58 |
| Labour | Jacqueline Anne Harding | 278 | 19.62 | –2.98 |
| Green | Joe Lloyd Thomas | 146 | 10.30 | N/A |
| Majority | | 165 | 11.64 | +3.84 |
| Turnout | | 1,435 | 31.77 | –0.23 |
| Registered electors | | 4,517 | | |
| Liberal Democrats hold | | Swing | | |

=== Trowbridge Drynham ===
Trowbridge Drynham
| Party | Candidate | Votes | % | ±% |
|---|---|---|---|---|
| Conservative | Antonio Calogero Piazza | 554 | 50.73 | –15.57 |
| Liberal Democrats | Andrew James Bryant * | 483 | 44.23 | +31.03 |
| Independent | John Douglas Sankey | 55 | 5.04 | N/A |
| Majority | | 71 | 6.50 | –39.0 |
| Turnout | | 1,107 | 32.79 | +1.59 |
| Registered electors | | 3,376 | | |
| Conservative hold | | Swing | | |

Note: Andrew James Bryant had previously gained the seat for the Liberal Democrats in a 2019 by-election.

=== Trowbridge Grove ===
Trowbridge Grove
| Party | Candidate | Votes | % | ±% |
|---|---|---|---|---|
| Liberal Democrats | David Charles Vigar | 572 | 41.66 | +1.46 |
| Conservative | David Edward Halik * | 537 | 39.11 | –5.69 |
| Labour | Emily Kate Pomroy-Smith | 180 | 13.11 | –1.89 |
| Green | Dale Robert Ingram | 84 | 6.12 | N/A |
| Majority | | 35 | 2.55 | N/A |
| Turnout | | 1,391 | 34.70 | +0.20 |
| Registered electors | | 4,009 | | |
| Liberal Democrats gain from Conservative | | Swing | | |

=== Trowbridge Lambrok ===
Trowbridge Lambrok
| Party | Candidate | Votes | % | ±% |
|---|---|---|---|---|
| Liberal Democrats | Jo Trigg * | 932 | 62.55 | +30.45 |
| Conservative | Laurence James Marshall | 468 | 31.41 | –14.09 |
| Green | Michael Anthony Searle | 90 | 6.04 | –0.96 |
| Majority | | 464 | 31.14 | N/A |
| Turnout | | 1,499 | 36.89 | +7.59 |
| Registered electors | | 4,063 | | |
| Liberal Democrats gain from Conservative | | Swing | | |

Note: Jo Trigg had previously gained the seat for the Liberal Democrats in a 2019 by-election.

=== Trowbridge Park ===
Trowbridge Park
| Party | Candidate | Votes | % | ±% |
|---|---|---|---|---|
| Conservative | Daniel Ryan Cave | 529 | 54.20 | +6.40 |
| Liberal Democrats | Stephen James Cooper | 262 | 26.84 | +10.34 |
| Labour | Thomas Peter Culshaw | 108 | 11.07 | –6.23 |
| Green | Gavin Hillel Lazarus | 77 | 7.89 | N/A |
| Majority | | 267 | 27.36 | –1.84 |
| Turnout | | 981 | 33.47 | +2.17 |
| Registered electors | | 2,931 | | |
| Conservative hold | | Swing | | |

=== Trowbridge Paxcroft ===
Trowbridge Paxcroft
| Party | Candidate | Votes | % | ±% |
|---|---|---|---|---|
| Liberal Democrats | Mel Jacob | 734 | 53.89 | –0.61 |
| Conservative | Emily Louisa Kirk | 628 | 46.11 | +8.61 |
| Majority | | 106 | 7.78 | –9.22 |
| Turnout | | 1,378 | 34.07 | +3.27 |
| Registered electors | | 4,045 | | |
| Liberal Democrats hold | | Swing | | |

=== Urchfont and Bishops Cannings ===
Urchfont and Bishops Cannings
| Party | Candidate | Votes | % | ±% |
|---|---|---|---|---|
| Conservative | Philip Whitehead * | 834 | 55.34 | N/A |
| Liberal Democrats | Lisa Kinnaird | 423 | 28.07 | N/A |
| Green | Simon Stephen Goodman | 250 | 16.59 | N/A |
| Majority | | 411 | 27.27 | N/A |
| Turnout | | 1,525 | 41.17 | N/A |
| Registered electors | | 3,704 | | |
| Conservative win (new seat) | | | | |

Note: in 2017, Phillip Whitehead was elected in Urchfont and The Cannings

=== Warminster Broadway ===
Warminster Broadway
| Party | Candidate | Votes | % | ±% |
|---|---|---|---|---|
| Conservative | Tony Jackson * | 681 | 52.42 | +2.92 |
| Independent | John Syme | 305 | 23.48 | N/A |
| Green | Richard Ivor Watson | 165 | 12.70 | N/A |
| Liberal Democrats | Martin David John Papworth | 148 | 11.39 | –1.31 |
| Majority | | 376 | 28.95 | +4.45 |
| Turnout | | 1,328 | 34.32 | –2.48 |
| Registered electors | | 3,869 | | |
| Conservative hold | | Swing | | |

=== Warminster East ===
Warminster East
| Party | Candidate | Votes | % | ±% |
|---|---|---|---|---|
| Conservative | Andrew Davis * | 660 | 45.02 | –3.28 |
| Independent | Paul Ian MacDonald | 574 | 39.15 | +7.55 |
| Green | Eddie Large | 153 | 10.44 | +6.44 |
| Liberal Democrats | Oscar Robert Vaughan | 79 | 5.39 | –1.81 |
| Majority | | 86 | 5.87 | –10.73 |
| Turnout | | 1,485 | 35.37 | –0.73 |
| Registered electors | | 4,198 | | |
| Conservative hold | | Swing | | |

=== Warminster North and Rural ===
Warminster North and Rural
| Party | Candidate | Votes | % | ±% |
|---|---|---|---|---|
| Conservative | Bill Parks | 977 | 69.74 | N/A |
| Liberal Democrats | Jenny Stratton | 424 | 30.26 | N/A |
| Majority | | 553 | 39.47 | N/A |
| Turnout | | 1,421 | 33.06 | N/A |
| Registered electors | | 4,298 | | |
| Conservative win (new seat) | | | | |

=== Warminster West ===
Warminster West
| Party | Candidate | Votes | % | ±% |
|---|---|---|---|---|
| Conservative | Pip Ridout * | 603 | 60.73 | +2.33 |
| Independent | Stacey Allensby | 244 | 24.57 | +8.67 |
| Liberal Democrats | Elizabeth Catherine Sally Lucy Charles | 146 | 14.70 | +1.9 |
| Majority | | 359 | 36.15 | –6.15 |
| Turnout | | 1,005 | 30.28 | +1.58 |
| Registered electors | | 3,319 | | |
| Conservative hold | | Swing | | |

=== Westbury East ===
Westbury East
| Party | Candidate | Votes | % | ±% |
|---|---|---|---|---|
| Liberal Democrats | Gordon Ian King * | 863 | 62.86 | +15.76 |
| Conservative | John Palmer Foster | 402 | 29.28 | –13.92 |
| Labour | Michael John Amos | 108 | 7.87 | –1.93 |
| Majority | | 461 | 33.58 | +29.78 |
| Turnout | | 1,381 | 41.63 | +4.53 |
| Registered electors | | 3,317 | | |
| Liberal Democrats hold | | Swing | | |

=== Westbury North ===
Westbury North
| Party | Candidate | Votes | % | ±% |
|---|---|---|---|---|
| Liberal Democrats | Carole King * | 653 | 59.80 | +1.90 |
| Conservative | Aaron Lewis Donovan | 309 | 28.30 | –0.80 |
| Green | Michael William Taylor | 97 | 8.88 | N/A |
| For Britain | Andy Wright | 33 | 3.02 | N/A |
| Majority | | 344 | 31.50 | +2.70 |
| Turnout | | 1,095 | 27.92 | –1.18 |
| Registered electors | | 3,922 | | |
| Liberal Democrats hold | | Swing | | |

Note: Carole King had previously held the seat for the Liberal Democrats in a 2019 by-election.

=== Westbury West ===
Westbury West
| Party | Candidate | Votes | % | ±% |
|---|---|---|---|---|
| Independent | Matthew Jonathan Anthony Dean * | 576 | 52.03 | N/A |
| Conservative | Daniel Joseph Butler | 266 | 24.03 | –4.57 |
| Labour | Jane Francesca Russ | 154 | 13.91 | +3.41 |
| Liberal Democrats | David Charles Cavill | 111 | 10.03 | –14.67 |
| Majority | | 310 | 28.00 | N/A |
| Turnout | | 1,115 | 28.04 | +0.94 |
| Registered electors | | 3,976 | | |
| Independent gain from Independent | | Swing | | |

Note: in 2017, Matthew Dean was elected in Salisbury St Pauls

=== Wilton ===
Wilton
| Party | Candidate | Votes | % | ±% |
|---|---|---|---|---|
| Conservative | Pauline Elizabeth Church * | 859 | 53.06 | N/A |
| Liberal Democrats | Peter Derek Edge | 565 | 34.90 | N/A |
| Green | Peter Jolyon Ellis Matthews | 101 | 6.24 | N/A |
| Labour | Seamus Green | 94 | 5.81 | N/A |
| Majority | | 294 | 18.16 | N/A |
| Turnout | | 1,635 | 43.46 | N/A |
| Registered electors | | 3,762 | | |
| Conservative win (new seat) | | | | |

Note: in 2017, Pauline Elizabeth Church was elected in Wilton and Lower Wylye Valley

=== Winsley and Westwood ===
Winsley and Westwood
| Party | Candidate | Votes | % | ±% |
|---|---|---|---|---|
| Conservative | Johnny Kidney * | 1,198 | 53.92 | –2.98 |
| Liberal Democrats | Richard Gregory Mann | 1,024 | 46.08 | +2.98 |
| Majority | | 174 | 7.84 | –5.86 |
| Turnout | | 2,237 | 56.39 | +1.19 |
| Registered electors | | 3,967 | | |
| Conservative hold | | Swing | | |

=== Winterslow and Upper Bourne Valley ===
Winterslow and Upper Bourne Valley
| Party | Candidate | Votes | % | ±% |
|---|---|---|---|---|
| Conservative | Rich Rogers | 976 | 44.79 | N/A |
| Independent | Christopher Devine * | 818 | 37.54 | N/A |
| Green | Harry Jacob Pannell | 151 | 6.93 | N/A |
| Liberal Democrats | Roxanne Eastland | 131 | 6.01 | N/A |
| Labour | Andrew Edward Cooke | 103 | 4.73 | N/A |
| Majority | | 158 | 7.20 | N/A |
| Turnout | | 2,195 | 53.85 | N/A |
| Registered electors | | 4,076 | | |
| Conservative win (new seat) | | | | |

=== Wylye Valley ===
Wylye Valley
| Party | Candidate | Votes | % | ±% |
|---|---|---|---|---|
| Conservative | Christopher Newbury* | 1,135 | 66.26 | N/A |
| Green | Julia Mary Tuff | 302 | 17.63 | N/A |
| Liberal Democrats | Josh Charles | 276 | 16.11 | N/A |
| Majority | | 833 | 48.63 | N/A |
| Turnout | | 1,737 | 46.63 | N/A |
| Registered electors | | 3,725 | | |
| Conservative win (new seat) | | | | |

Note: in 2017, Christopher Newbury was elected in the former Warminster Copheap and Wylye

== Changes 2021–2025 ==
- April 2023: Jack Oatley, elected as an independent councillor for Melksham Forest, joined the Conservatives.
- April 2024: Edward Kirk left the Conservative group and became an ungrouped councillor.
- October 2024: Mike Sankey left the Conservative group and became an ungrouped councillor.
- February 2025: Antonio Piazza left the Conservative group.

=== By-elections ===
==== Salisbury St Paul's ====
The by-election was triggered by the death of Conservative councillor Mary Webb in August 2022; she had run an award-winning accessible bed-and-breakfast in Salisbury before her election in 2021.

Salisbury St Paul's by-election, 3 November 2022
| Party | Candidate | Votes | % | ±% |
|---|---|---|---|---|
| Liberal Democrats | Sam Charleston | 830 | 64.84 | +34.82 |
| Labour | Tony Mears | 237 | 18.52 | –3.31 |
| Conservative | Katrina Sale | 213 | 16.64 | –15.62 |
| Majority | | 593 | 46.33 | N/A |
| Rejected ballots | | 7 | | |
| Turnout | | 1,287 | 32.95 | –4.15 |
| Registered electors | | 3,906 | | |
| Liberal Democrats gain from Conservative | | Swing | +25.2 | |

==== Tisbury ====
The by-election was triggered by the resignation of Liberal Democrat councillor Nick Errington.

Tisbury by-election, 8 June 2023
| Party | Candidate | Votes | % | ±% |
|---|---|---|---|---|
| Liberal Democrats | Richard Budden | 1,028 | 66.97 | +19.37 |
| Conservative | Quentin Edwards | 507 | 33.03 | –0.76 |
| Majority | | 521 | 33.94 | +20.13 |
| Rejected ballots | | 11 | | |
| Turnout | | 1,546 | 42.62 | −2.94 |
| Registered electors | | 3,627 | | |
| Liberal Democrats hold | | Swing | +10.1 | |

==== Calne Chilvester and Abberd ====
The by-election was triggered by the sudden death of Conservative councillor Tony Trotman at his home on 30 November 2023; he had represented the division since 2009 and served as Mayor of Calne on four occasions.

Calne Chilvester and Abberd by-election, 22 February 2024
| Party | Candidate | Votes | % | ±% |
|---|---|---|---|---|
| Liberal Democrats | Robert MacNaughton | 424 | 45.25 | +18.06 |
| Conservative | Taylor Paul Dickson Clarke | 283 | 30.20 | –16.81 |
| Labour | Nick Maslen | 172 | 18.36 | +3.70 |
| Green | Hugh Pilcher-Clayton | 58 | 6.19 | –4.95 |
| Majority | | 141 | 15.05 | N/A |
| Rejected ballots | | 10 | | |
| Turnout | | 947 | 24.00 | –7.90 |
| Registered electors | | 3,946 | | |
| Liberal Democrats gain from Conservative | | Swing | +17.4 | |

==== Cricklade and Latton ====
The by-election was triggered by the death of Liberal Democrat councillor Bob Jones MBE, who suffered a cardiac arrest at his home in Cricklade on 4 January 2024.

Cricklade and Latton by-election, 14 March 2024
| Party | Candidate | Votes | % | ±% |
|---|---|---|---|---|
| Liberal Democrats | Nick Dye | 1,030 | 76.01 | +13.86 |
| Conservative | Luke Lawrence Jowett | 253 | 18.67 | –19.18 |
| Labour | John Francis Barnes | 45 | 3.32 | N/A |
| Green | Anna Marie | 27 | 1.99 | N/A |
| Majority | | 777 | 57.34 | +33.05 |
| Rejected ballots | | 1 | | |
| Turnout | | 1,356 | 33.28 | –19.21 |
| Registered electors | | 4,074 | | |
| Liberal Democrats hold | | Swing | +16.5 | |
