= 2017 Wiltshire Council election =

2017 UK local government election

← 2013	4 May 2017	2021 →

All 98 seats to Wiltshire Council 50 seats needed for a majority
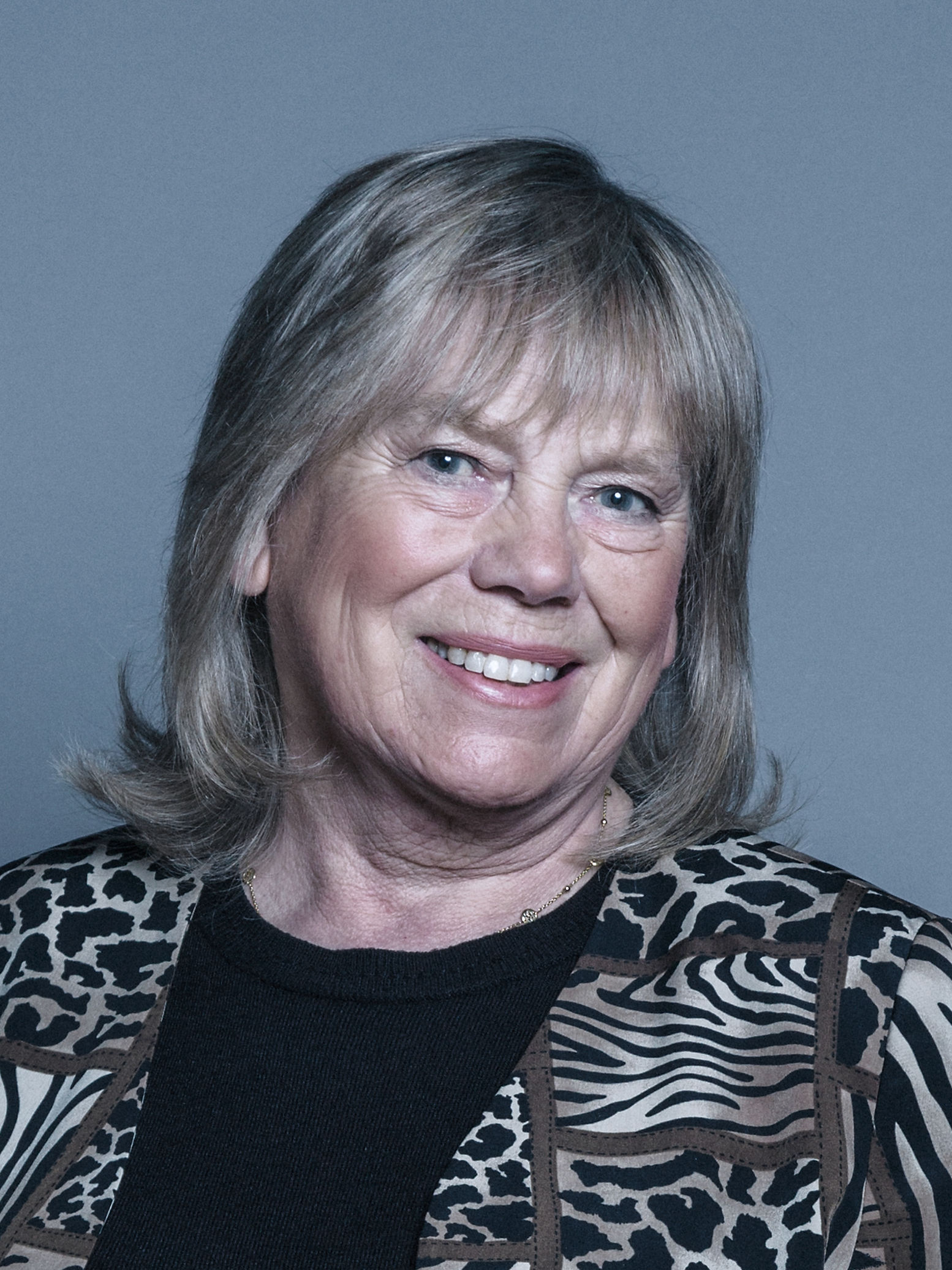
	First party	Second party
		LD
Leader	Baroness Scott of Bybrook	Glenis Ansell
Party	Conservative	Liberal Democrats
Leader's seat	By Brook	Calne North (defeated)
Last election	58 seats, 42.8%	27 seats, 20.3%
Seats won	68	20
Seat change	▲10	▼7
Popular vote	74,257	38,217
Percentage	52.0%	27.0%
Swing	▲9.2%	▲6.7%
	Third party	Fourth party
	Ind	Lab
Leader	Ernie Clark	Ricky Rogers
Party	Independent	Labour
Leader's seat	Hilperton	Salisbury Bemerton
Last election	8 seats, 10.6%	4 seats, 10.2%
Seats won	7	3
Seat change	▼1	▼1
Popular vote	12,093	13,152
Percentage	8.5%	9.2%
Swing	▼2.1%	▼1.0%
- Map showing the composition of Wiltshire Council following the election. Blue showing Conservative, Red showing Labour, Yellow showing Liberal Democrats and Grey showing Independents.
Council control before election
Conservative
Council control after election
Conservative

The 2017 Wiltshire Council election took place on 4 May 2017 as part of the 2017 local elections in the United Kingdom. All 98 councillors were elected from electoral divisions which returned one councillor each by first-past-the-post voting for a four-year term of office.

== Composition before election ==
Elected in 2013		Before election	
Party	Seats	Party	Seats
Conservative	58	Conservative	62
Liberal Democrats	27	Liberal Democrats	22
Independent	8	Independent	10
Labour	4	Labour	4
UKIP	1	UKIP	1

== Uncontested election ==
At the close of nominations on 4 April 2017, there was one electoral division in which only one candidate had come forward: John Smale (Conservative), in Bulford, Allington and Figheldean. He was thus elected unopposed.

== Results summary ==
Wiltshire Council election, 2017
Party	Seats	Gains	Losses	Net gain/loss	Seats %	Votes %	Votes	+/−
Conservative	68	13	3	+10	69.4	51.9	65,584	17,003
Liberal Democrats	20	3	10	-7	20.4	26.0	32,812	9812
Labour	3	0	1	-1	3.1	9.1	11,839	314
Independent	7	2	3	-1	7.4	9.1	11,551	-43
Green	0	0	0	0	0	2.1	3,003	2323
Devizes Guardians	0	0	0	0	0	0.7	905	-494
UKIP	0	0	1	–1	0	0.5	685	-15,956
Together We Can Reform	0	0	0	0	0	0.0	21	21

== Electoral division results ==
The electoral division results listed below are based on the changes from the 2013 elections, not taking into account any party defections or by-elections.

=== Aldbourne and Ramsbury ===
Aldbourne and Ramsbury
Party	Candidate	Votes	%	±%
Conservative	James Sheppard	1,056	67.4	+3.5
Liberal Democrats	Fran Bishop	538	17.8	n/a
Labour	Jason Steven Haythornwaite	147	9.4	n/a
Green	Brian Roy Utton	147	5.4	n/a
Majority		778	49.6	
Turnout		1,568	38.8	+1.5
Conservative hold		Swing		

=== Alderbury and Whiteparish ===
Alderbury and Whiteparish
Party	Candidate	Votes	%	±%
Conservative	Richard Britton	825	59.4	+2.8
Independent	Gideon Bruce Aymes	342	24.6	n/a
Liberal Democrats	John Phillip Edrich	118	8.5	n/a
Labour	Kim Eleanor Glennon-Alty	105	7.6	−3.7
Majority		483	34.8	
Turnout		1,394	41.0	+5.0
Conservative hold		Swing		

=== Amesbury East ===
Amesbury East
Party	Candidate	Votes	%	±%
Conservative	Robert Alexander Yuill	669	48.2	+3.5
Liberal Democrats	Helen Martina Holdsworth	434	31.3	n/a
UKIP	Rhod Evans	118	8.5	−33.8
Labour	Julie Anne Martingale	84	6.1	−6.9
Majority		235	16.9	
Turnout		1,389	29.7	
Conservative hold		Swing		

Note: Jamie Paul Capp had previously gained the seat for the Liberal Democrats in a 2016 by-election.

=== Amesbury West ===
Amesbury West
Party	Candidate	Votes	%	±%
Conservative	Fred Westmoreland	874	74.2	+37.2
Labour	Tom Corbin	168	14.3	+3.0
Liberal Democrats	Gerard Francis Wynn	136	11.5	n/a
Majority		706	58.9	
Turnout		1,196	32.3	+0.2
Conservative hold		Swing		

=== Bourne and Woodford Valley ===
Bourne and Woodford Valley
Party	Candidate	Votes	%	±%
Conservative	Mike Hewitt	983	65.5	−6.4
Liberal Democrats	Dineen Marianne Hopper	364	24.2	n/a
Labour	Lindsey Elizabeth Bellringer	155	10.3	−17.8
Majority		619	41.3	
Turnout		1,509	43.7	+8.7
Conservative hold		Swing		

=== Box and Colerne ===
Box and Colerne
Party	Candidate	Votes	%	±%
Liberal Democrats	Brian George Felton Mathew	979	52.4	+15.2
Conservative	Sheila Gladys Parker	818	43.8	+0.8
Labour	Peter Neil Baldrey	70	3.8	−5.2
Majority		161	8.6	
Turnout		1,867	49.2	+8.1
Liberal Democrats gain from Conservative		Swing		

=== Bradford-on-Avon North ===
Bradford-on-Avon North
Party	Candidate	Votes	%	±%
Liberal Democrats	Jim Lynch	1,262	59.8	+13.1
Conservative	Pam Hyde	850	40.3	+20.1
Majority		412	19.5	
Turnout		2,145	56.5	+14.9
Liberal Democrats hold		Swing		

=== Bradford-on-Avon South ===
Bradford-on-Avon South
Party	Candidate	Votes	%	±%
Liberal Democrats	Sarah Gibson	1,197	55.8	+7.3
Conservative	Clive Alfred Samuel Hilton	724	33.8	+11.4
Labour	Rosie Macgregor	224	10.4	−3.4
Majority		473	22.0	
Turnout		2,157	52.8	+8.9
Liberal Democrats hold		Swing		

=== Brinkworth ===
Brinkworth
Party	Candidate	Votes	%	±%
Conservative	Toby Russell Sturgis	1,083	65.4	+6.2
Liberal Democrats	Christopher Hugh Tuite	572	34.6	+20.3
Majority		511	30.8	
Turnout		1,667	45.2	+7.3
Conservative hold		Swing		

=== Bromham, Rowde and Potterne ===
Bromham, Rowde and Potterne
Party	Candidate	Votes	%	±%
Conservative	Anna Louise Cuthbert	823	59.3	+3.8
Independent	Philip Alfred Brown	242	17.4	n/a
Liberal Democrats	Ralph Andre Frederick Elia	138	9.9	n/a
Labour	Dianne Mary Gilpin	106	7.6	n/a
Green	Margaret Ursula Green	79	5.7	n/a
Majority		581	41.9	
Turnout		1,394	36.1	−38.4
Conservative hold		Swing		

Note: Anna Louise Cuthbert had previously held the seat for the Conservative Party in a 2015 by-election.

=== Bulford, Allington and Figheldean ===
Bulford, Allington and Figheldean
Party	Candidate	Votes	%	±%
Conservative	John Frederick Smale	unopposed	n/a	n/a
Conservative hold				

=== Burbage and The Bedwyns ===
Burbage and The Bedwyns
Party	Candidate	Votes	%	±%
Conservative	Stuart John Kennedy Wheeler	1,021	68.0	−14.6
Liberal Democrats	Parvis Jamieson	216	14.4	n/a
Labour	John Brian Thornton	134	8.9	−8.5
Green	Emma Jane Clarissa Dawnay	130	8.7	n/a
Majority		805	53.6	
Turnout		1,504	38.8	+7.2
Conservative hold		Swing		

=== By Brook ===
By Brook
Party	Candidate	Votes	%	±%
Conservative	Jane Scott	1,032	71.5	+5.5
Liberal Democrats	Mary Geraldine Sheila Finch	223	15.5	+2.8
Green	Phillip Christopher Chamberlain	100	6.9	n/a
Labour	Stephen Charles Wheeler	88	6.1	n/a
Majority		809	56.0	
Turnout		1,446	40.3	+4.7
Conservative hold		Swing		

Note: Jane Scott retired in February 2020.

=== Calne Central ===
Calne Central
Party	Candidate	Votes	%	±%
Liberal Democrats	Ian Leslie Thorn	754	51.6	+13.5
Conservative	Howard Robin Marshall	562	38.5	+2.1
Labour	John Boaler	144	9.9	n/a
Majority		192	13.1	
Turnout		1,462	42.6	+9.5
Liberal Democrats hold		Swing		

=== Calne Chilvester and Abberd ===
Calne Chilvester and Abberd
Party	Candidate	Votes	%	±%
Conservative	Tony Trotman	683	50.4	+3.9
Liberal Democrats	Robert Matthew Merrick	417	30.8	+6.2
Labour	Mike MacGregor-Fairlie	254	18.8	n/a
Majority		266	19.6	
Turnout		1,356	34.4	+7.6
Conservative hold		Swing		

=== Calne North ===
Calne North
Party	Candidate	Votes	%	±%
Conservative	Tom Rounds	459	45.4	+11.1
Liberal Democrats	Glenis Jean Ansell	380	37.6	−2.4
Labour	Jon Fisher	172	17.0	n/a
Majority		79	7.8	
Turnout		1,014	30.8	+6.4
Conservative gain from Liberal Democrats		Swing		

=== Calne Rural ===
Calne Rural
Party	Candidate	Votes	%	±%
Conservative	Christine Crisp	1,092	68.2	+21.0
Liberal Democrats	Rob Clarke	356	22.2	+13.2
Labour	Tom Morris	154	9.6	n/a
Majority		736	45.8	
Turnout		1,607	45.5	+4.7
Conservative hold		Swing		

=== Calne South and Cherhill ===
Calne South and Cherhill
Party	Candidate	Votes	%	±%
Conservative	Alan Kenneth Hill	892	65.1	+18.5
Liberal Democrats	Declan Alexander William Boore	312	22.8	−5.4
Labour	John Alan Bennett	167	12.2	n/a
Majority		580	45.8	
Turnout		1,380	36.6	+0.4
Conservative hold		Swing		

=== Chippenham Cepen Park and Derriads ===
Chippenham Cepen Park and Derriads
Party	Candidate	Votes	%	±%
Conservative	Peter John Hutton	901	68.0	+22.3
Liberal Democrats	Christopher Leonard Norris	270	20.4	+11.1
Labour	Ian Shaun Flower	155	11.7	−3.2
Majority		631	47.3	
Turnout		1,333	39.7	+6.3
Conservative hold		Swing		

=== Chippenham Cepen Park and Redlands ===
Chippenham Cepen Park and Redlands
Party	Candidate	Votes	%	±%
Conservative	Andy Phillips	700	63.4	+13.4
Liberal Democrats	Conor Melvin	268	24.3	+14.4
Labour	Jeremy Richard Griffin Comerford	137	12.4	−4.8
Majority		432	39.1	
Turnout		1,106	31.4	+2.3
Conservative hold		Swing		

=== Chippenham Hardenhuish ===
Chippenham Hardenhuish
Party	Candidate	Votes	%	±%
Conservative	Melody Rhonda Thompson	669	46.7	+27.5
Liberal Democrats	Daniel Andrew Webb	634	44.3	+14.3
Labour	David Charles Barter	128	8.9	+2.2
Majority		35	2.4	
Turnout		1,440	41.5	+4.4
Conservative gain from Liberal Democrats		Swing		

Note: Melody Rhonda Thompson had previously gained the seat for the Conservative Party in a 2015 by-election.

=== Chippenham Hardens and England ===
Chippenham Hardens and England
Party	Candidate	Votes	%	±%
Liberal Democrats	Bill Douglas	662	54.9	+17.3
Conservative	Robert John Bradfield Giles	543	45.1	+22.5
Majority		119	9.7	
Turnout		1,223	37.1	+6.2
Liberal Democrats hold		Swing		

=== Chippenham Lowden and Rowden ===
Chippenham Lowden and Rowden
Party	Candidate	Votes	%	±%
Liberal Democrats	Ross Henning	539	40.1	+7.9
Independent	David Keith Poole	406	30.2	n/a
Conservative	Paul Duncan Newman	400	29.7	+9.5
Majority		133	9.8	
Turnout		1,353	37.0	+6.7
Liberal Democrats hold		Swing		

=== Chippenham Monkton ===
Chippenham Monkton
Party	Candidate	Votes	%	±%
Independent	Nick Murry	983	62.4	n/a
Conservative	Caroline Veronica Ramsey	300	19.0	+6.7
Liberal Democrats	Matt Harding	293	18.6	−51.7
Majority		683	43.1	
Turnout		1,585	52.2	+5.8
Independent gain from Liberal Democrats		Swing		

=== Chippenham Pewsham ===
Chippenham Pewsham
Party	Candidate	Votes	%	±%
Liberal Democrats	Clare Morforwyn Cape	740	51.5	+3.6
Conservative	Teresa Marie Hutton	696	48.5	+23.9
Majority		44	3.0	
Turnout		1,448	42.0	+10.6
Liberal Democrats hold		Swing		

=== Chippenham Queens and Sheldon ===
Chippenham Queens and Sheldon
Party	Candidate	Votes	%	±%
Conservative	Ashley O'Neill	817	60.4	+27.9
Liberal Democrats	Desna Barbara Allen	536	39.6	+4.4
Majority		281	20.7	
Turnout		1,357	41.3	+4.0
Conservative gain from Liberal Democrats		Swing		

=== Corsham Pickwick ===
Corsham Pickwick
Party	Candidate	Votes	%	±%
Liberal Democrats	Ruth Mary Catherine Hopkinson	753	50.3	+36.7
Conservative	Alan MacRae	601	40.2	+4.4
Labour	William Stephen Gilbert	142	9.5	−12.4
Majority		152	10.1	
Turnout		1,500	39.8	+8.8
Liberal Democrats gain from Conservative		Swing		

=== Corsham Town ===
Corsham Town
Party	Candidate	Votes	%	±%
Conservative	Philip Hardman Whalley	980	52.5	+12.8
Liberal Democrats	Kelly Ann Duckhouse	746	40.0	+6.5
Labour	Steve Abbott	141	7.6	+0.3
Majority		234	12.5	
Turnout		1,868	49.0	+5.7
Conservative hold		Swing		

=== Corsham Without and Box Hill ===
Corsham Without and Box Hill
Party	Candidate	Votes	%	±%
Conservative	Ben Anderson	1,168	69.4	+12.8
Green	Tina Maria Johnston	514	30.6	n/a
Majority		654	38.6	
Turnout		1,693	41.3	+3.0
Conservative hold		Swing		

=== Cricklade and Latton ===
Cricklade and Latton
Party	Candidate	Votes	%	±%
Liberal Democrats	Bob Jones	923	48.8	−7.8
Conservative	Peter Anthony Colmer	883	46.7	+3.3
Labour	Graham William Davies	85	4.5	n/a
Majority		40	2.1	
Turnout		1,894	48.7	+7.1
Liberal Democrats hold		Swing		

=== Devizes and Roundway South ===
Devizes and Roundway South
Party	Candidate	Votes	%	±%
Conservative	Simon David Jacobs	613	40.2	+6.0
Devizes Guardians	Chris Greenwood	294	19.3	−10.7
Independent	Chris Callow	177	11.6	n/a
Independent	Ian Richard Porter Hopkins	168	11.0	−5.6
Labour	Ivor Llewellyn Blackmore	146	9.6	−3.6
Liberal Democrats	James Thomas Melville Kay	128	8.4	+2.4
Majority		319	20.8	
Turnout		1,532	44.4	+3.7
Conservative hold		Swing		

=== Devizes East ===
Devizes East
Party	Candidate	Votes	%	±%
Conservative	Peter Evans	483	42.8	−2.0
Devizes Guardians	Jane Mary Burton	276	24.5	−7.8
Liberal Democrats	Alan Charles Rankin	192	17.0	n/a
Labour	Laura Kate Naylor	177	15.7	−7.2
Majority		207	18.2	
Turnout		1,135	36.7	+5.5
Conservative hold		Swing		

=== Devizes North ===
Devizes North
Party	Candidate	Votes	%	±%
Conservative	Sue Evans	579	46.8	+4.9
Devizes Guardians	Nigel Denys Carter	335	27.1	−9.4
Green	Simon Charles Thompson	171	13.8	n/a
Labour	Patricia Baxter	153	12.4	−9.2
Majority		244	19.6	
Turnout		1,245	38.7	+5.5
Conservative hold		Swing		

=== Downton and Ebble Valley ===
Downton and Ebble Valley
Party	Candidate	Votes	%	±%
Conservative	Richard John Clewer	944	64.7	+2.6
Green	Robert William Steel	208	14.3	n/a
Labour	Ben Wynn	188	12.9	n/a
Liberal Democrats	Harry David Ashcroft	120	8.2	n/a
Majority		736	50.3	
Turnout		1,464	39.0	+0.6
Conservative hold		Swing		

=== Durrington and Larkhill ===
Durrington and Larkhill
Party	Candidate	Votes	%	±%
Independent	Graham Wright	1,384	80.1	+1.7
Conservative	Jan Burns	345	20.0	−1.6
Majority		1,039	59.8	
Turnout		1,738	34.9	+5.3
Independent hold		Swing		

Note: Graham Wright had previously been elected in 2013 for the Liberal Democrats. The change in his voteshare shown is the change from the voteshare he won as a Liberal Democrat in 2013.

=== Ethandune ===
Ethandune
Party	Candidate	Votes	%	±%
Conservative	Jerry Wickham	1,059	71.8	+11.1
Liberal Democrats	Anne Elizabeth Ball	416	28.2	+3.6
Majority		643	43.1	
Turnout		1,492	41.3	+5.6
Conservative hold		Swing		

Note: Jerry Wickham had previously held the seat for the Conservatives in a 2014 by-election.

=== Fovant and Chalke Valley ===
Fovant and Chalke Valley
Party	Candidate	Votes	%	±%
Conservative	Jose Green	971	65.0	n/a
Independent	William Donald Keir Holmes	339	22.7	n/a
Liberal Democrats	Oliver Arthur Broomfield Holdsworth	185	12.4	n/a
Majority		632	42.1	
Turnout		1,501	44.1	n/a
Conservative hold		Swing		

=== Hilperton ===
Hilperton
Party	Candidate	Votes	%	±%
Independent	Ernie Clark	1,342	79.7	−7.7
Conservative	Charles Russ	208	12.3	+4.5
Liberal Democrats	George Stanton	135	8.0	n/a
Majority		1,134	67.0	
Turnout		1,692	43.3	+2.5
Independent hold		Swing		

=== Holt and Staverton ===
Holt and Staverton
Party	Candidate	Votes	%	±%
Liberal Democrats	Trevor William Carbin	941	64.3	+18.9
Conservative	Richard William Nathaniel Warren	522	35.7	+5.7
Majority		419	28.6	
Turnout		1,466	42.0	+8.4
Liberal Democrats hold		Swing		

=== Kington ===
Kington
Party	Candidate	Votes	%	±%
Conservative	Howard Greenman	1,257	69.2	+6.0
Liberal Democrats	Matthew John Bragg	380	20.9	+4.5
Labour	Liam Nicholas John Stokes	179	9.9	n/a
Majority		877	48.3	
Turnout		1,817	45.4	+4.5
Conservative hold		Swing		

=== Laverstock, Ford and Old Sarum ===
Laverstock, Ford and Old Sarum
Party	Candidate	Votes	%	±%
Labour	Ian David McLennan	1,050	63.4	−11.1
Conservative	Mark Jonathan Lamdin McClelland	607	36.6	+11.1
Majority		443	26.7	
Turnout		1,660	41.7	+9.3
Labour hold		Swing		

=== Ludgershall and Perham Down ===
Ludgershall and Perham Down
Party	Candidate	Votes	%	±%
Conservative	Chris Williams	679	69.9	n/a
Liberal Democrats	Charles Edward Lambert	100	10.3	n/a
UKIP	Leslie Alexander Webster	98	10.1	n/a
Green	Teresa Mary Thornton	94	9.7	n/a
Majority		579	69.6	
Turnout		976	26.7	n/a
Conservative hold		Swing		

=== Lyneham ===
Lyneham
Party	Candidate	Votes	%	±%
Conservative	Allison Mary Bucknell	938	77.0	+18.0
Liberal Democrats	Trudie Ann Clarkson	217	17.8	+5.0
Labour	Terry Couchman	64	5.3	n/a
Majority		721	59.0	
Turnout		1,223	38.7	+5.3
Conservative hold		Swing		

=== Malmesbury ===
Malmesbury
Party	Candidate	Votes	%	±%
Liberal Democrats	Gavin Grant	946	53.9	+5.7
Conservative	Frances Sheppard	699	39.8	+11.6
Labour	Fred Price	110	6.3	−1.7
Majority		247	14.0	
Turnout		1,761	43.1	+3.3
Liberal Democrats hold		Swing		

=== Marlborough East ===
Marlborough East
Party	Candidate	Votes	%	±%
Conservative	Stewart Raymond Dobson	733	60.5	+28.4
Liberal Democrats	John Alexander Kirk Wilson	274	22.6	+10.9
Labour	Katherine Grace Davis	205	16.9	+8.6
Majority		459	37.7	
Turnout		1,217	37.1	+3.6
Conservative hold		Swing		

=== Marlborough West ===
Marlborough West
Party	Candidate	Votes	%	±%
Independent	Nick Fogg	754	54.6	−0.9
Conservative	Tamara Louise Reay	507	36.7	−1.9
Labour	Sylvia Christine Card	121	8.8	+2.9
Majority		247	17.8	
Turnout		1,386	46.6	+6.6
Independent hold		Swing		

=== Melksham Central ===
Melksham Central
Party	Candidate	Votes	%	±%
Liberal Democrats	Hayley Jayne Spencer	481	37.9	+8.2
Conservative	Mike Swanton	379	29.8	+6.2
UKIP	David Martin Pollitt	152	12.0	−21.5
Independent	Martin Willard Pain	150	11.8	n/a
Labour	Paul Grainger	108	8.5	−4.7
Majority		102	7.9	
Turnout		1,284	33.7	+4.0
Liberal Democrats gain from UKIP		Swing		

=== Melksham North ===
Melksham North
Party	Candidate	Votes	%	±%
Liberal Democrats	Pat Aves	590	45.5	+13.7
Conservative	Nick Holder	519	40.0	+11.0
Independent	Geoff Mitcham	104	8.0	n/a
Independent	Richard George Wiltshire	85	6.6	n/a
Majority		71	5.4	
Turnout		1,311	36.3	+3.3
Liberal Democrats hold		Swing		

=== Melksham South ===
Melksham South
Party	Candidate	Votes	%	±%
Liberal Democrats	Jon Hubbard	1,045	68.4	+17.6
Conservative	Mike Sankey	484	31.7	+16.8
Majority		561	36.3	
Turnout		1,544	38.6	+1.6
Liberal Democrats hold		Swing		

=== Melksham Without North ===
Melksham Without North
Party	Candidate	Votes	%	±%
Conservative	Phil Alford	1,019	54.9	+28.4
Independent	Terry Chivers	838	45.1	+4.2
Majority		181	9.7	
Turnout		1,871	43.3	+0.9
Conservative gain from Independent		Swing		

=== Melksham Without South ===
Melksham Without South
Party	Candidate	Votes	%	±%
Conservative	Roy Sidney While	709	55.3	+14.4
Liberal Democrats	Ryan James Clarke	232	18.1	+5.9
UKIP	Paul Robert Carter	178	13.9	−24.5
Independent	Steve Petty	163	12.7	−n/a
Majority		477	37.0	
Turnout		1,289	32.0	+2.4
Conservative hold		Swing		

=== Mere ===
Mere
Party	Candidate	Votes	%	±%
Independent	George Edwin Jeans	1,339	66.9	−9.3
Conservative	Mike Liddicoat	399	19.9	+4.1
Labour	John Anthony Jordan	264	13.2	n/a
Majority		940	46.8	
Turnout		2,010	57.9	
Independent hold		Swing		

=== Minety ===
Minety
Party	Candidate	Votes	%	±%
Conservative	Chuck Berry	1,137	74.3	+21.7
Liberal Democrats	Nicola Helen Middleton	294	19.2	+9.5
Labour	Hilary Ann Foord	99	6.5	−1.2
Majority		843	54.9	
Turnout		1,535	40.1	−2.6
Conservative hold		Swing		

=== Nadder and East Knoyle ===
Nadder and East Knoyle
Party	Candidate	Votes	%	±%
Conservative	Bridget Anne Wayman	964	66.9	+4.4
Liberal Democrats	Jill Caudle	478	33.2	n/a
Majority		486	33.6	
Turnout		1,447	41.5	+2.4
Conservative hold		Swing		

=== Pewsey ===
Pewsey
Party	Candidate	Votes	%	±%
Conservative	Jeremy James Kunkler	1,085	72.1	−2.0
Liberal Democrats	David Roland Leighton	249	16.6	n/a
Labour	Hannah Sarah White-Overton	170	11.3	−14.6
Majority		836	55.2	
Turnout		1,514	39.4	+4.6
Conservative hold		Swing		

=== Pewsey Vale ===
Pewsey Vale
Party	Candidate	Votes	%	±%
Conservative	Paul Oatway	1,064	77.3	+12.9
Liberal Democrats	Fiona Clare Hornby	176	12.8	−9.5
Labour	Michael Anthony Bohan	137	10.0	−3.3
Majority		888	64.3	
Turnout		1,382	39.2	+4.3
Conservative hold		Swing		

=== Purton ===
Purton
Party	Candidate	Votes	%	±%
Conservative	Jacqui Lay	991	74.7	+3.9
Liberal Democrats	Kate Ann Blye	335	25.3	n/a
Majority		656	49.1	
Turnout		1,337	32.2	+2.9
Conservative hold		Swing		

=== Redlynch and Landford ===
Redlynch and Landford
Party	Candidate	Votes	%	±%
Conservative	Leo Randall	1,020	66.5	+7.9
Liberal Democrats	Martin James Rosell	316	20.6	n/a
Labour	Finbarr Sheehan	198	12.9	−2.5
Majority		704	45.9	
Turnout		1,535	41.0	+6.9
Conservative hold		Swing		

=== Roundway ===
Roundway
Party	Candidate	Votes	%	±%
Conservative	Laura Evelyn Mayes	838	69.0	+5.1
Labour	Kathleen Margaret Shaw	137	11.3	+1.3
Green	Geoff Brewer	124	10.2	n/a
Liberal Democrats	Alasdair Kirkpatrick	115	9.5	n/a
Majority		701	57.7	
Turnout		1,215	34.9	+2.9
Conservative hold		Swing		

=== Royal Wootton Bassett East ===
Royal Wootton Bassett East
Party	Candidate	Votes	%	±%
Conservative	Mollie Eileen May Groom	1,048	69.8	−4.0
Liberal Democrats	Simon Richard Hodkinson	279	18.6	−7.6
Labour	James Edward Sexton	174	11.6	n/a
Majority		769	50.9	
Turnout		1,512	39.2	+5.8
Conservative hold		Swing		

=== Royal Wootton Bassett North ===
Royal Wootton Bassett North
Party	Candidate	Votes	%	±%
Conservative	Mary Isabel Champion	744	52.6	+6.6
Liberal Democrats	Stephen Richard Walls	510	36.1	+7.0
Labour	Heather Denise Reilly	160	11.3	n/a
Majority		234	16.5	
Turnout		1,418	39.5	+10.3
Conservative hold		Swing		

=== Royal Wootton Bassett South ===
Royal Wootton Basset South
Party	Candidate	Votes	%	±%
Liberal Democrats	Chris Hurst	1,061	49.2	+9.5
Conservative	Paul Justin Heaphy	863	40.0	+3.1
Labour	Ron Bardwell	132	6.1	−0.1
Independent	Peter Joseph Doyle	102	4.7	n/a
Majority		198	9.1	
Turnout		2,164	44.0	+6.1
Liberal Democrats hold		Swing		

=== Salisbury Bemerton ===
Salisbury Bemerton
Party	Candidate	Votes	%	±%
Labour	Ricky Rogers	568	46.3	−11.0
Conservative	Gavin Paul Barrett	408	33.2	+14.6
UKIP	Dean Palethorpe	92	7.5	−16.6
Liberal Democrats	Robert William Steel	87	7.1	n/a
Green	Julia Anne Richardson	73	5.9	n/a
Majority		160	13.0	
Turnout		1,232	28.0	+6.1
Labour hold		Swing		

=== Salisbury Fisherton and Bemerton Village ===
Salisbury Fisherton and Bemerton Village
Party	Candidate	Votes	%	±%
Labour	John Michael Perrings Walsh	471	34.3	−2.2
Conservative	Jeremy Robert Lloyd Nettle	405	29.5	−6.9
Liberal Democrats	Mark Philip Duly	208	15.1	−12.0
Independent	Chris Cochrane	139	10.1	n/a
Green	Alison Craig	102	7.4	n/a
UKIP	Paddy Singh	49	3.6	n/a
Majority		67	4.9	
Turnout		1,379	39.9	+7.9
Labour hold		Swing		

=== Salisbury Harnham ===
Salisbury Harnham
Party	Candidate	Votes	%	±%
Liberal Democrats	Brian Edward Dalton	827	44.5	−2.3
Conservative	Simon James Jackson	756	40.7	+8.9
Labour	Merrin Holroyd	112	6.0	−0.9
Green	Peter Jolyon Matthews	97	5.2	n/a
UKIP	Naomi May King	66	3.6	−9.9
Majority		71	3.8	
Turnout		1,862	45.5	+8.6
Liberal Democrats hold		Swing		

=== Salisbury St Edmund and Milford ===
Salisbury St Edmund and Milford
Party	Candidate	Votes	%	±%
Conservative	Atiqul Hoque	654	40.5	+17.5
Liberal Democrats	Bobbie Chettleburgh	551	34.1	−8.9
Labour	Clive Robert Vincent	209	12.9	−1.6
Green	Sue Wright	182	11.3	+3.8
Together We Can Reform	Colin Skelton	21	1.3	n/a
Majority		103	6.4	
Turnout		1,619	44.4	+10.8
Conservative gain from Liberal Democrats		Swing		

Note: Atiqul Hoque had previously gained the seat for the Conservative Party in a 2015 by-election.

=== Salisbury St Francis and Stratford ===
Salisbury St Francis and Stratford
Party	Candidate	Votes	%	±%
Conservative	Mary Jacquelin Douglas	909	49.4	−4.7
Liberal Democrats	Julian James Sargood Ellis	596	32.4	+18.4
Green	Richard Bolton	187	10.2	−1.7
Labour	Steven Ian Wadsworth	147	8.0	−12.1
Majority		313	17.0	
Turnout		1,845	45.0	+11.0
Conservative hold		Swing		

=== Salisbury St Marks and Bishopdown ===
Salisbury St Marks and Bishopdown
Party	Candidate	Votes	%	±%
Conservative	Derek William Brown	671	45.0	−12.4
Independent	Hilary Anne Davidson	416	27.9	n/a
Liberal Democrats	Rebecca Ann Heulwen Foster	241	16.2	+0.2
Labour	Tom Mettyear	164	11.0	−15.6
Majority		255	17.0	
Turnout		1,496	37.2	+5.8
Conservative hold		Swing		

=== Salisbury St Martins and Cathedral ===
Salisbury St Martins and Cathedral
Party	Candidate	Votes	%	±%
Conservative	Sven Hocking	817	41.0	+9.8
Labour	Ian Robert Tomes	699	35.1	−6.1
Liberal Democrats	Greg Condliffe	313	15.7	+9.3
Green	Teresa Jane Mary Fallon	115	5.8	−0.2
UKIP	Frances Mary Patricia Howard	50	2.5	−12.7
Majority		118	5.9	
Turnout		2,007	48.0	+9.1
Conservative gain from Labour		Swing		

=== Salisbury St Pauls ===
Salisbury St Pauls
Party	Candidate	Votes	%	±%
Conservative	Matthew Jonathan Anthony Dean	650	44.7	+11.7
Liberal Democrats	Paul William Leslie Sample	324	22.3	+15.1
Labour	Caroline Susan Corbin	301	20.7	−7.1
Green	Benji Goehl	180	12.4	−2.6
Majority		326	22.3	
Turnout		1,462	39.3	+7.7
Conservative hold		Swing		

=== Sherston ===
Sherston
Party	Candidate	Votes	%	±%
Conservative	John Percy Simon Stuart Thomson	1,150	68.6	−6.0
Liberal Democrats	Martin Fausing Smith	418	24.9	+10.9
Labour	Steven James Clark	108	6.4	−5.0
Majority		732	43.5	
Turnout		1,683	42.0	+6.4
Conservative hold		Swing		

=== Southwick ===
Southwick
Party	Candidate	Votes	%	±%
Conservative	Horace John Prickett	1,142	81.5	+38.6
Liberal Democrats	Kevin Ian Cottrell	259	18.5	+14.5
Majority		883	62.4	
Turnout		1,415	39.9	+6.3
Conservative hold		Swing		

=== Summerham and Seend ===
Summerham and Seend
Party	Candidate	Votes	%	±%
Conservative	Jonathon Seed	1,047	56.1	−12.2
Liberal Democrats	Jo McManus	821	44.0	n/a
Majority		226	12.1	
Turnout		1,873	53.7	+10.6
Conservative hold		Swing		

=== The Collingbournes and Netheravon ===
The Collingbournes and Netheravon
Party	Candidate	Votes	%	±%
Conservative	Ian Charles Duke Blair-Pilling	808	63.8	n/a
Independent	Alan Stephen Wood	276	21.8	n/a
Liberal Democrats	Glenn Barry Price	91	7.2	n/a
Green	Denis Christopher Griffin	91	7.2	n/a
Majority		532	42.0	
Turnout		1,266	38.6	n/a
Conservative hold		Swing		

=== The Lavingtons and Erlestoke ===
The Lavingtons and Erlestoke
Party	Candidate	Votes	%	±%
Conservative	Richard Elliott Gamble	1,213	74.1	−2.5
Liberal Democrats	Mark Domnech William Mangham	157	9.6	n/a
Labour	Carol Black	142	8.7	−14.7
Green	Chris Gingell	125	7.6	n/a
Majority		1,056	64.2	
Turnout		1,644	40.7	+8.2
Conservative hold		Swing		

=== Tidworth ===
Tidworth
Party	Candidate	Votes	%	±%
Conservative	Mark Connolly	711	84.3	n/a
Labour	Joan Barnett	133	15.8	n/a
Majority		578	68.4	
Turnout		845	18.1	n/a
Conservative hold		Swing		

=== Till and Wylye Valley ===
Till and Wylye Valley
Party	Candidate	Votes	%	±%
Conservative	Darren George Henry	1,134	54.2	+14.5
Liberal Democrats	Ian Clive West	923	44.1	−11.0
Labour	Gary James Buckley	34	1.6	−3.6
Majority		211	10.1	
Turnout		2,095	57.8	+12.5
Conservative gain from Liberal Democrats		Swing		

=== Tisbury ===
Tisbury
Party	Candidate	Votes	%	±%
Conservative	Tony Deane	846	61.8	+1.3
Liberal Democrats	Marcus Deyes	341	24.9	n/a
Green	Christopher H Walford	182	13.3	n/a
Majority		505	36.9	
Turnout		1,370	38.4	+1.4
Conservative hold		Swing		

=== Trowbridge Adcroft ===
Trowbridge Adcroft
Party	Candidate	Votes	%	±%
Conservative	Edward Kirk	483	42.7	+25.0
Liberal Democrats	Nicholas Blakemore	446	39.4	−12.3
Labour	Adrian John Poole	202	17.9	n/a
Majority		37	3.3	
Turnout		1,135	31.5	+3.2
Conservative gain from Liberal Democrats		Swing		

=== Trowbridge Central ===
Trowbridge Central
Party	Candidate	Votes	%	±%
Liberal Democrats	Stewart Martin Palmen	511	42.6	+1.8
Conservative	John Roland Wallace Knight	417	34.8	+17.0
Labour	Phoebe Eliana Rosalind Kemp	271	22.6	+7.6
Majority		94	7.8	
Turnout		1,202	32.0	+6.4
Liberal Democrats hold		Swing		

=== Trowbridge Drynham ===
Trowbridge Drynham
Party	Candidate	Votes	%	±%
Conservative	Graham David Payne	654	66.3	−5.8
Labour	Laura Michelle Pictor	203	20.6	n/a
Liberal Democrats	John Richard Marsden	130	13.2	−14.7
Majority		451	45.5	
Turnout		992	31.2	+7.7
Conservative hold		Swing		

=== Trowbridge Grove ===
Trowbridge Grove
Party	Candidate	Votes	%	±%
Conservative	David Edward Halik	509	44.8	+25.8
Liberal Democrats	Bob Brice	457	40.2	n/a
Labour	Liz Gifford	170	15.0	n/a
Majority		52	4.6	
Turnout		1,138	34.5	
Conservative gain from Independent		Swing		

Note: Chris Auckland had previously gained the seat for the Liberal Democrats in a 2016 by-election.

=== Trowbridge Lambrok ===
Trowbridge Lambrok
Party	Candidate	Votes	%	±%
Conservative	Deborah Ann Halik	488	45.5	+13.8
Liberal Democrats	Ben Midgley	344	32.1	n/a
Labour	Shaun Samuel James Henley	165	15.4	n/a
Green	Marie Hillcoat	75	7.0	n/a
Majority		144	13.4	
Turnout		1,075	29.3	+2.3
Conservative gain from Independent		Swing		

=== Trowbridge Park ===
Trowbridge Park
Party	Candidate	Votes	%	±%
Conservative	Peter Fuller	551	47.8	+7.6
Independent	Dennis Paul Drewett	213	18.5	−24.6
Labour	Jackie Harding	199	17.3	n/a
Liberal Democrats	Roger Guy Andrews	190	16.5	−0.2
Majority		338	29.2	
Turnout		1,158	31.3	+6.1
Conservative gain from Independent		Swing		

=== Trowbridge Paxcroft ===
Trowbridge Paxcroft
Party	Candidate	Votes	%	±%
Liberal Democrats	Stephen John Oldrieve	750	54.5	−11.1
Conservative	James Rothschild St Clair	516	37.5	+3.1
Labour	Maria Adlam-Apps	110	8.0	n/a
Majority		234	17.0	
Turnout		1,379	30.8	+1.5
Liberal Democrats hold		Swing		

=== Urchfont and The Cannings ===
Urchfont and The Cannings
Party	Candidate	Votes	%	±%
Conservative	Philip Whitehead	1,156	71.8	+22.1
Liberal Democrats	John Nicholas Merrett	256	15.9	n/a
Labour	Amanda Hopgood	199	12.4	−4.5
Majority		900	55.1	
Turnout		1,633	42.4	+5.3
Conservative hold		Swing		

=== Warminster Broadway ===
Warminster Broadway
Party	Candidate	Votes	%	±%
Conservative	Tony Jackson	665	49.5	−5.1
Independent	Paul Batchelor	335	24.9	n/a
Labour	Eden Morris	173	12.9	n/a
Liberal Democrats	Martin David John Papworth	171	12.7	n/a
Majority		330	24.5	
Turnout		1,349	36.8	+6.3
Conservative hold		Swing		

=== Warminster Copheap and Wylye ===
Warminster Copheap and Wylye
Party	Candidate	Votes	%	±%
Conservative	Christopher Newbury	1,046	74.6	+3.3
Liberal Democrats	Ryan John Ellis Bird	204	14.5	n/a
Labour	Nicola Clare Grove	153	10.9	n/a
Majority		842	59.5	
Turnout		1,416	39.9	+8.5
Conservative hold		Swing		

=== Warminster East ===
Warminster East
Party	Candidate	Votes	%	±%
Conservative	Andrew Davis	734	48.3	+8.7
Independent	Paul Ian MacDonald	480	31.6	−2.3
Labour	Eleanor May Free	136	9.0	n/a
Liberal Democrats	Nigel Paul Hampson	109	7.2	n/a
Green	Maggie Richens	60	4.0	n/a
Majority		254	16.6	
Turnout		1,528	36.1	+3.9
Conservative hold		Swing		

=== Warminster West ===
Warminster West
Party	Candidate	Votes	%	±%
Conservative	Pip Ridout	694	58.4	n/a
Independent	Stacie Allensby	189	15.9	n/a
Liberal Democrats	Andy Hinchcliffe	152	12.8	n/a
Green	Carrie Moyes	90	7.6	n/a
Labour	Tony Free	64	5.4	n/a
Majority		505	42.3	
Turnout		1,193	28.7	n/a
Conservative hold		Swing		

=== Warminster Without ===
Warminster Without
Party	Candidate	Votes	%	±%
Conservative	Fleur de Rhé-Philipe	1,014	73.3	+0.9
Liberal Democrats	Jonathan Whitehead-Whiting	214	15.5	n/a
Labour	Anthony Paul Tyler	156	11.3	−11/4
Majority		658	49.3	
Turnout		1,334	39.4	+7.3
Conservative hold		Swing		

=== West Selkley ===
West Selkley
Party	Candidate	Votes	%	±%
Conservative	Jane Frances Davies	933	70.2	−7.1
Liberal Democrats	Sara Elizabeth Spratt	275	20.7	n/a
Labour	Matthew James Bowman Lee	122	9.2	n/a
Majority		800	57.8	
Turnout		1,385	40.3	+4.4
Conservative hold		Swing		

=== Westbury East ===
Westbury East
Party	Candidate	Votes	%	±%
Liberal Democrats	Gordon Ian King	661	47.1	+5.4
Conservative	Rupert Ashley Lescott	607	43.2	+26.5
Labour	Mike Kettlety	137	9.8	n/a
Majority		54	3.8	
Turnout		1,408	37.1	+5.3
Liberal Democrats hold		Swing		

=== Westbury North ===
Westbury North
Party	Candidate	Votes	%	±%
Liberal Democrats	David Jenkins	596	57.9	+3.8
Conservative	David Lancashire	299	29.1	+16.7
Labour	Michael Sutton	134	13.0	+1.3
Majority		297	28.8	
Turnout		1,033	29.1	+1.8
Liberal Democrats hold		Swing		

=== Westbury West ===
Westbury West
Party	Candidate	Votes	%	±%
Independent	Russell Mark Jonathan Hawker	352	33.4	−4.7
Conservative	Nick Stovold	301	28.6	+15.5
Liberal Democrats	Carole King	260	24.7	+19.1
Labour	Jane Francesca Russ	111	10.5	−4.6
Green	Margaret Frances Cavanna	29	2.8	n/a
Majority		51	4.8	
Turnout		1,053	27.1	+5.1
Independent hold		Swing		

=== Wilton and Lower Wylye Valley ===
Wilton and Lower Wylye Valley
Party	Candidate	Votes	%	±%
Conservative	Pauline Elizabeth Church	760	46.0	+12.3
Liberal Democrats	Peter Derek Edge	692	41.9	−15.1
Labour	Olivia McLennan	200	12.1	+2.8
Majority		68	4.1	
Turnout		1,661	43.3	+10.0
Conservative gain from Liberal Democrats		Swing		

=== Winsley and Westwood ===
Winsley and Westwood
Party	Candidate	Votes	%	±%
Conservative	Johnny Kidney	1,040	56.9	+15.7
Liberal Democrats	Magnus Ian Macdonald	788	43.1	−3.0
Majority		252	13.7	
Turnout		1,836	55.2	+11.8
Conservative gain from Liberal Democrats		Swing		

=== Winterslow ===
Winterslow
Party	Candidate	Votes	%	±%
Independent	Christopher Devine	775	47.2	n/a
Conservative	Christopher Duncan Miller	590	35.9	n/a
Liberal Democrats	Colin Richard Baxter	159	9.7	n/a
Green	Alice Jean Kiff	74	4.5	n/a
Labour	Ian Martingale	45	2.7	n/a
Majority		185	11.2	
Turnout		1,645	51.9	
Independent gain from Conservative		Swing		

Note: In 2013, Christopher Devine had won the seat unopposed as a Conservative candidate.

== By-elections between 2017 and 2021 ==
=== Trowbridge Drynham ===
Trowbridge Drynham By-Election 4 July 2019
Party	Candidate	Votes	%	±%
Liberal Democrats	Andrew James Bryant	431	41.6	+28.4
Conservative	Khamal Akeem Reynolds	316	30.5	–35.8
Independent	John Roland Wallace Knight	246	23.7	+23.7
Labour	Shaun Samuel James Henley	44	4.2	–16.4
Majority		115	11.1	
Turnout		1,038	33	
Liberal Democrats gain from Conservative		Swing	+32.1	

=== Westbury North ===
Westbury North By-Election 18 July 2019
Party	Candidate	Votes	%	±%
Liberal Democrats	Carole King	488	52.4	–5.6
Independent	Ian Cunningham	231	24.8	n/a
Conservative	Antonio Piazza	140	15.0	–14.0
Labour	Jane Russ	57	6.1	–6.9
Independent	Francis Morland	16	1.7	n/a
Majority		257	27.6	
Turnout		936	24.43	
Liberal Democrats hold		Swing	+4.2	

=== Ethandune ===
Ethandune By-Election 19 September 2019
Party	Candidate	Votes	%	±%
Conservative	Suzanne Grahem Wickham	778	57.0	–14.8
Liberal Democrats	Alan Charles Rankin	587	43.0	+14.8
Majority		191	14.0	
Turnout		1,371	38.01	
Conservative hold		Swing	–14.8	

=== Melksham Without South ===
Melksham Without South By-Election 24 October 2019
Party	Candidate	Votes	%	±%
Conservative	Nicholas James Holder	593	60.4	+5.1
Liberal Democrats	Vanessa Fiorelli	388	39.6	+21.5
Majority		205	20.9	–16.1
Turnout		992	24.8	
Conservative hold		Swing	–8.2	

=== Trowbridge Lambrok ===
Trowbridge Lambrok By-Election 28 November 2019
Party	Candidate	Votes	%	±%
Liberal Democrats	Joanne Lisa Trigg	622	57.5	+25.4
Conservative	David Charles Cavill	455	42.1	–3.4
Majority		167	15.4	
Turnout		1,081	29.53	
Liberal Democrats gain from Conservative		Swing	+14.4	

=== Till and Wylye Valley ===
Till and Wylye Valley By-Election 10 March 2020
Party	Candidate	Votes	%	±%
Conservative	Kevin Stuart Daley	637	49.6	–4.6
Liberal Democrats	Harry David Ashcroft	623	48.5	+4.4
Labour	Timothy John Treslove	24	1.9	+0.3
Majority		14	1.1	–9.0
Turnout		1,286	35.6	–22.2
Conservative hold		Swing	–4.5	

== By-election not held ==
Jane Scott retired as councillor for By Brook in February 2020, following her appointment as a government whip in the House of Lords. In March 2020, a by-election to take place on 2 April was announced. Nick Botterill was selected to stand for the Conservatives, Lesley Bennet for the Liberal Democrats. However, later in March the by-election was cancelled by the Returning Officer, due to COVID-19 lockdown guidance.

The seat remained vacant until the Wiltshire Council election in May 2021, when Botterill was elected.
