= Brian Mathew (politician) =

British politician

Brian Mathew MP
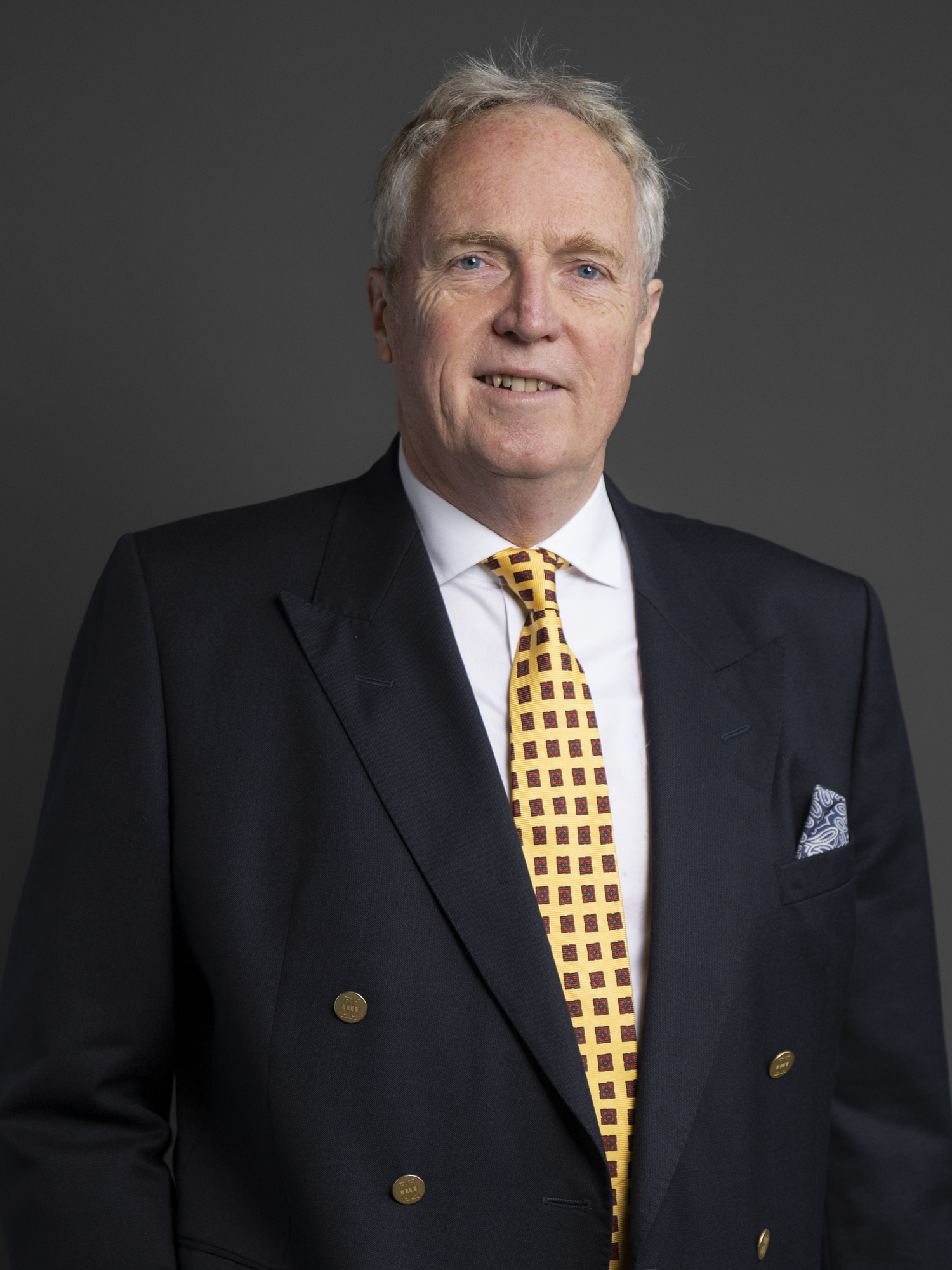
- Official portrait, 2024

Member of Parliament for Melksham and Devizes
- Incumbent
- Assumed office 4 July 2024
- Preceded by: Constituency established
- Majority: 2,401 (4.7%)

Personal details
- Born: Brian George Felton Mathew
- Party: Liberal Democrats
- Education: University of East Anglia; University of Reading; Cranfield University

Brian George Felton Mathew is a British Liberal Democrat politician who has been the Member of Parliament for Melksham and Devizes since 2024. He defeated former Conservative minister Michelle Donelan, who had chosen to contest this seat in view of boundary changes at her Chippenham seat.

== Early life and education ==
Mathew was educated at Millfield School, Street and graduated from the University of East Anglia in 1983 with a bachelor's degree in development studies. This was followed by a Postgraduate Diploma in agricultural engineering from Cranfield University's Silsoe College. In 1988, he gained a Master of Arts (MA) degree in rural social development at the University of Reading and in 2005 a PhD in water and sanitation at Cranfield University.

== Career ==
Mathew had stood unsuccessfully for the North Wiltshire seat in 2015, 2017 and 2019. He previously stood in North Somerset in 2010 but lost to Liam Fox.

Mathew previously worked for aid organisations, including WaterAid in Tanzania. He was elected for the Box & Colerne ward of Wiltshire Council in 2017 and re-elected in 2021.
