= Semington Halt railway station =

Former railway station in Wiltshire, England

Coordinates: 51.35254°N 2.14508°W

Semington Halt

General information
- Location: Semington, Wiltshire; England
- Platforms: 1

Other information
- Status: Disused

History
- Original company: Great Western Railway
- Pre-grouping: Great Western Railway

Key dates
- 1 October 1906: Opened
- 18 April 1966: Closed
Location

Semington Halt railway station was a small railway station serving Semington in Wiltshire, England, between 1906 and 1966. The station was on the Devizes Branch Line, in between Holt Junction and Seend.

== Opening ==
The line from Devizes to Holt Junction was opened in 1857. Semington Halt opened on 1 October 1906, north of the village on the Melksham to Westbury road, at a time when the Great Western Railway was increasing the number of railmotor-served halts in the South West. The single-platform halt was on an embankment with no vehicular access.

== Closure ==
The line suffered from reduced traffic after the completion of the Stert and Westbury Railway that bypassed the Devizes line in order to reduce the London to Bristol distance by five miles.

The entire branch line was closed in April 1966 under the Beeching cuts and the halt was destroyed in 1970, along with the rest of the line. The site of the station is now a private residence.

Preceding station	Disused railways	Following station
Seend; Line and station closed	Great Western Railway; Devizes Branch Line	Holt Junction; Line and station closed
