= Seend railway station =

Former railway station in England

Seend

General information
- Location: Seend, Wiltshire; England
- Coordinates: 51.3557°N 2.0955°W
- Grid reference: ST934618
- Platforms: 2

Other information
- Status: Disused

History
- Original company: Great Western Railway
- Pre-grouping: Great Western Railway
- Post-grouping: Great Western Railway

Key dates
- 1 July 1857: Opened
- 18 April 1966: Closed
Location

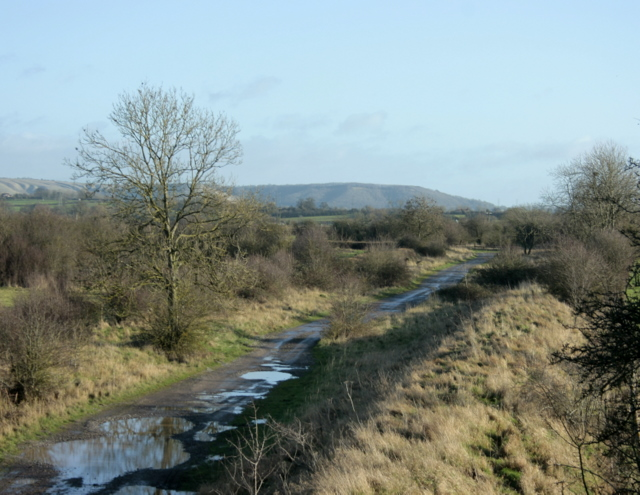
Former railway near Seend in December 2009

Seend railway station was near the village of Seend in Wiltshire, England. The station was a stop on the Devizes Branch Line, between Semington and Bromham & Rowde. Its position northwest of the village was chosen to serve the iron ore quarry and iron works at Seend Cleeve.

After the completion of the Devizes line, the junction at Holt made the line part of the fastest route from London to the West Country. The line suffered from reduced traffic after the completion in 1900 of the Stert and Westbury Railway between Patney and Chirton station and Westbury, which by-passed the Devizes branch to shorten the London to Plymouth journey by five miles.

Seend station and the entire Devizes Branch Line were closed under the Beeching cuts in April 1966. Both were destroyed in 1970.

== See also ==
- Devizes railway station

Preceding station	Disused railways	Following station
Bromham and Rowde Halt; Line and station closed	Great Western Railway; Devizes Branch Line	Semington Halt; Line and station closed
