= Devizes =

Town in Wiltshire, England

Coordinates: 51°21′10″N 01°59′45″W

- Market town and civil parish
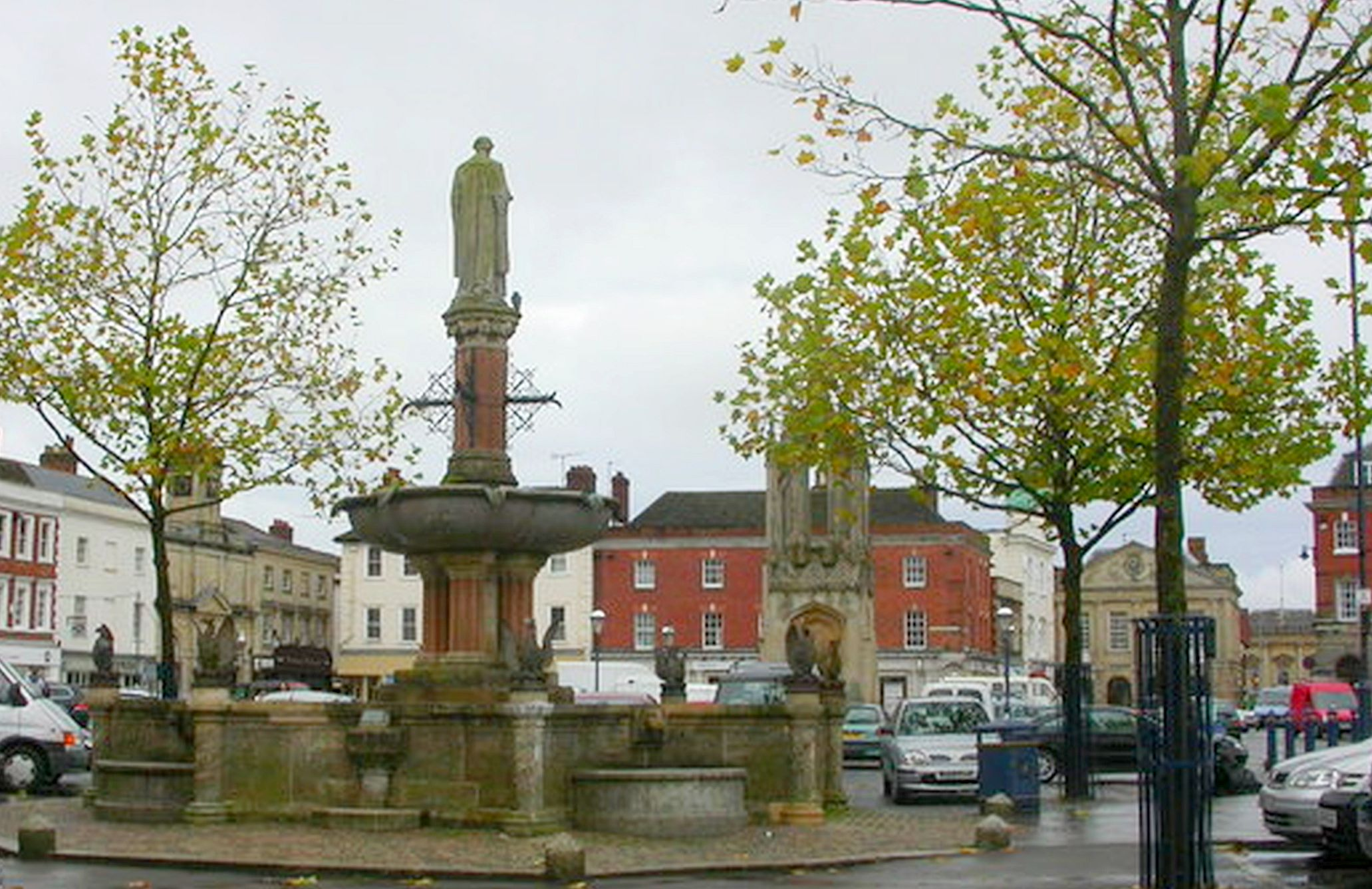
- Market Place

- Arms of Devizes

- Location within Wiltshire
- Environs of Devizes
- Population: 16,834 (2021 Census)
- OS grid reference: SU0061
- Civil parish: Devizes
- Unitary authority: Wiltshire
- Ceremonial county: Wiltshire
- Region: South West
- Country: England
- Sovereign state: United Kingdom
- Post town: Devizes
- Postcode district: SN10
- Dialling code: 01380
- Police: Wiltshire
- Fire: Dorset and Wiltshire
- Ambulance: South Western
- UK Parliament: Melksham and Devizes
- Website: Town Council

Devizes (/dɪˈvaɪzɪz/) is a market town and civil parish in Wiltshire, England. It developed around Devizes Castle, an 11th-century Norman castle, and received a charter in 1141. The castle was besieged during the Anarchy, a 12th-century civil war between Stephen of England and Empress Matilda, and again during the English Civil War when the Cavaliers lifted the siege at the Battle of Roundway Down and the Parliamentarian Army of the West under Sir William Waller was routed. Devizes remained under Royalist control until 1645, when Oliver Cromwell attacked and forced the Royalists to surrender. The castle was destroyed in 1648 on the orders of Parliament, and today little remains of it.

From the 16th century Devizes became known for its textiles, and by the early 18th century it held the largest corn market in the West Country, constructing the Corn Exchange in 1857. In the 18th century, brewing, curing of tobacco, and snuff-making were established. The Wadworth Brewery was founded in the town in 1875.

Standing at the west edge of the Vale of Pewsey and the northwestern edge of Salisbury Plain, Devizes is about 10 1/2 miles (17 kilometres) southeast of Chippenham and 11 miles (18 km) northeast of the county town of Trowbridge. The town has nearly five hundred listed buildings, some notable churches, a town hall and a green in the centre.

== History ==
Devizes Castle was built by Osmund, Bishop of Salisbury, in 1080, but the town is not mentioned in Domesday Book of 1086. Because the castle was on the boundaries of the manors of Rowde, Bishops Cannings and Potterne it became known as the castrum ad divisas ("the castle at the boundaries"), hence the name Devizes. On John Speed's map of Wiltshire (1611), the town's name is recorded as The Devyses.

A new castle was built in stone by Roger of Salisbury, Osmund's successor. Devizes received its first charter in 1141, permitting regular markets. The castle changed hands several times during the Anarchy, a civil war between Stephen of Blois and Matilda in the 12th century. The castle held important prisoners, including (from 1106) Robert Curthose, eldest son of William the Conqueror.

The town has had churches since the 12th century and today has four Church of England parish churches.

During the 12th and 13th centuries, the town of Devizes developed outside the castle with craftsmen and traders setting up businesses to serve the residents of the castle. The first known market in Devizes was in 1228. The original market was in the large space outside St Mary's Church, rather than in the current Market Place, which at that time would have been within the castle's outer bailey.

In 1643, during the English Civil War, Parliamentary forces under Sir William Waller besieged Royalist forces under Sir Ralph Hopton in Devizes. The siege was lifted by a relief force from Oxford under Henry Wilmot, 1st Earl of Rochester, and Waller's forces were almost totally destroyed at the Battle of Roundway Down. Devizes remained under Royalist control until 1645, when Oliver Cromwell attacked and forced the Royalists to surrender. The castle was destroyed in 1648 on the orders of Parliament, a process known as slighting, and today little remains of it; almost all of the present structure is from the 19th century.

From the 16th century, Devizes became known for its textiles: initially white woollen broadcloth but later the manufacture of serge, drugget, felt, and cassimere or Zephyr cloth. In the mid 18th century, Devizes held the largest corn market in the West Country of England and also traded hops, cattle, horses and various types of cloth. Before the Corn Exchange was built in 1857, the trade in wheat and barley was conducted in the open, with sacks piled around the market cross.

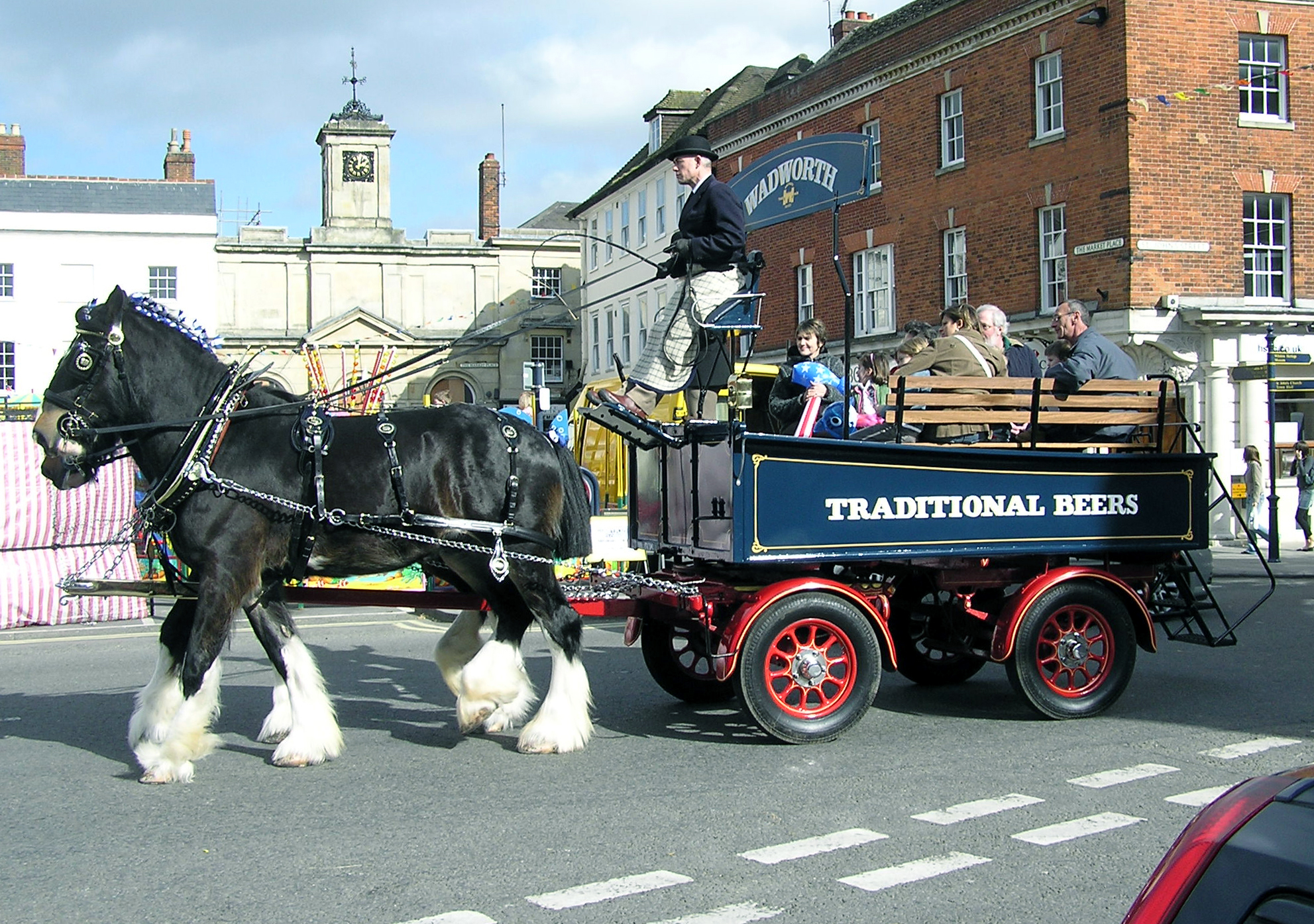
The Shire horses of the Wadworth Brewery are giving the public a ride but normally deliver beer locally

The pond known as The Crammer, east of the town centre, is claimed to be site of the 18th-century Moonrakers story which led to a colloquial name for Wiltshire people. A new Devizes Prison, or County House of Corrections, was opened in 1817. This replaced the Bridewell that had been built in Bridewell Street in 1579. The new prison was built of brick and stone, and was designed by Richard Ingleman as a two-storey polygon surrounding a central governor's house. It had an operational life of more than ninety years and was closed in 1922. It stood on the north side of the Castle's Old Park, across the Kennet and Avon Canal by way of a bridge still called Prison Bridge. The House of Corrections was demolished by 1928.

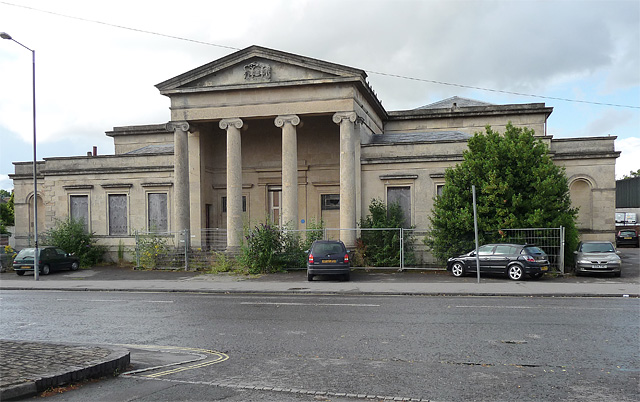
Devizes Assize Court, future home of the Wiltshire Museum

In 1853 the Wiltshire Archaeological and Natural History Society was founded in the town, and later opened a museum in Long Street. Now called the Wiltshire Museum, its collections are designated as being of national significance. The museum has extensive Bronze Age collections and includes finds from the Stonehenge and Avebury World Heritage Site, including West Kennet Long Barrow, Marden Henge and Bush Barrow. There are plans to move the museum into the grade II* listed former Devizes Assize Court, northwest of the town centre, where facilities for community events will also be provided.

There was a military presence in the town at Le Marchant Barracks, from 1878 until the 1980s.

== Governance ==
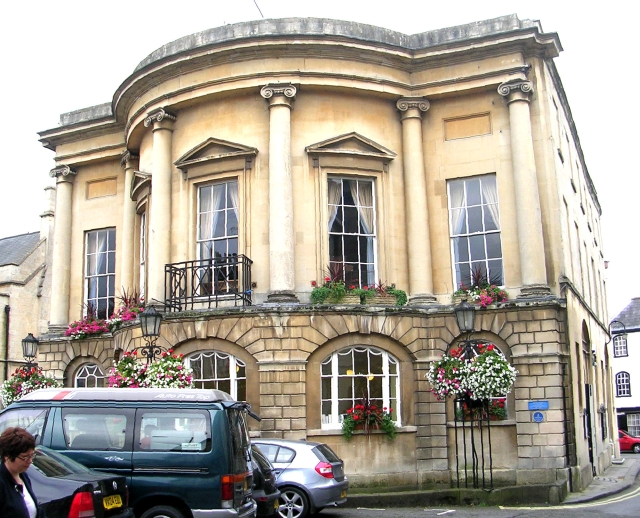
Devizes Town Hall

Devizes is a civil parish with an elected town council. As of 2025, 13 councillors are Devizes Guardians, 6 Conservatives, 1 Labour and 1 Independent. The parish includes the small settlement of Dunkirk, on the northeastern slopes of the hill, which was transferred from Rowde parish in 1835. Part of the built-up area to the north, around 1,200 houses, is in Bishops Cannings parish. In May 2017, the former Roundway parish merged; at the same time, adjustments to the boundary with Bishops Canning were made.

The town is within the area of the Wiltshire Council unitary authority, where two of the elected members for Devizes are Liberal Democrats and two are Conservatives. Most significant local government services are the responsibility of Wiltshire Council, while the town and parish councils have a more consultative role. Before the Local Government Act took effect in 1974, Devizes was a municipal borough with its headquarters at Devizes Town Hall. It then became the administrative centre for the much larger District of Kennet, until that was abolished as part of the 2009 structural changes.

Devizes is part of the Melksham and Devizes Westminster constituency, first contested at the 2024 general election, when it was won by Brian Mathew for the Liberal Democrats.

The council has twinning associations with Mayenne in France, Oamaru in New Zealand, Tornio in Finland, and Waiblingen in Germany.

== Media ==
The local radio station is Fantasy Radio, a community radio station that broadcasts on 97 FM.

The Gazette and Herald is the town's local weekly newspaper.

== Landmarks ==
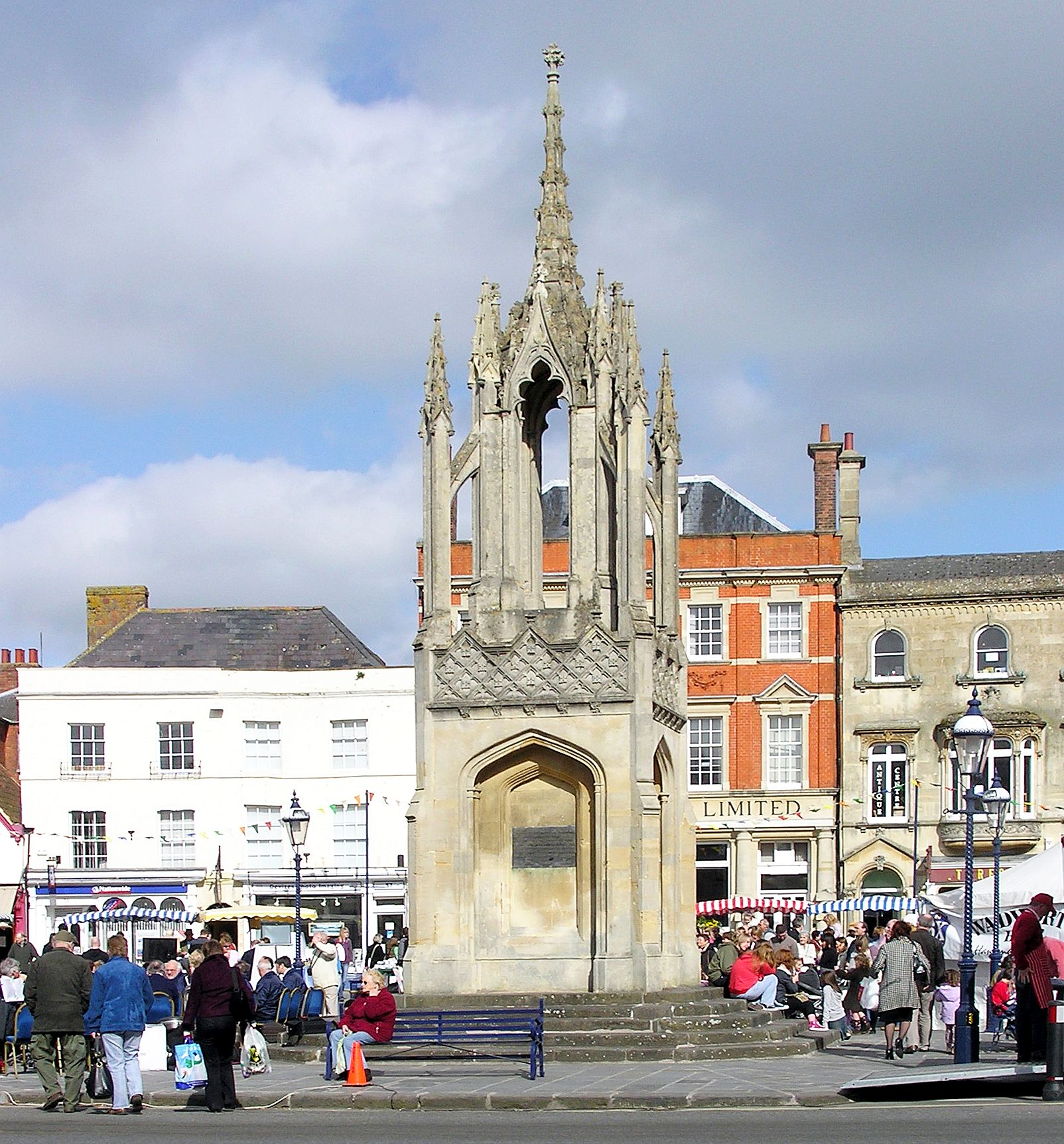
The Market Cross, built in 1814 to replace an earlier cross standing a little to the south

Devizes has more than 500 listed buildings, a large number for a town of its size. The Trust for Devizes has a Town Trail map which provides a guide to many of them. 17 Market Place is a substantial grade I listed house from the early 18th century. Brownston House is another grade I house, on New Park Street; it has been home to four MPs and two Army Generals from 1700, and housed a young ladies' boarding school from 1859 to 1901. It was conserved in 1976 by Wiltshire Council and is now a business head office. Heathcote House on the Green in Devizes is a grade II* listed building; its history is associated with the church and education. No 8 Long Street was the house of the clothier Samuel Powell, as well as Admiral Joseph Tayler, one of the inspirations for C.S. Forester's fictional hero Horatio Hornblower. Southbroom House, close to the Green, was built in 1501, then burnt down and was rebuilt by the Eyles family in 1772; it is now at the heart of Devizes School.

In the centre of the Market Place is the Market Cross, rebuilt in 1814 to designs of James Wyatt. The cross displays the tale of a woman, Ruth Pierce, who dropped dead suddenly after being discovered cheating. In 2014, the town celebrated the 200th anniversary of the Market Cross, marked by Viscount Sidmouth and his cousin, High Sheriff of Wiltshire Peter Addington.

== Transport ==
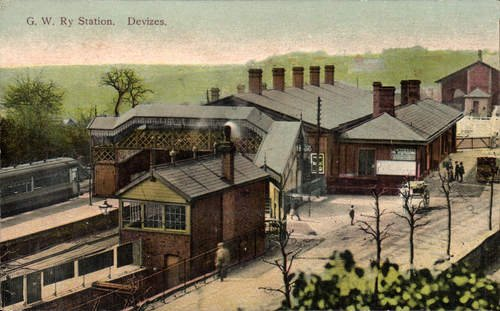
The former Devizes railway station (closed 1966)

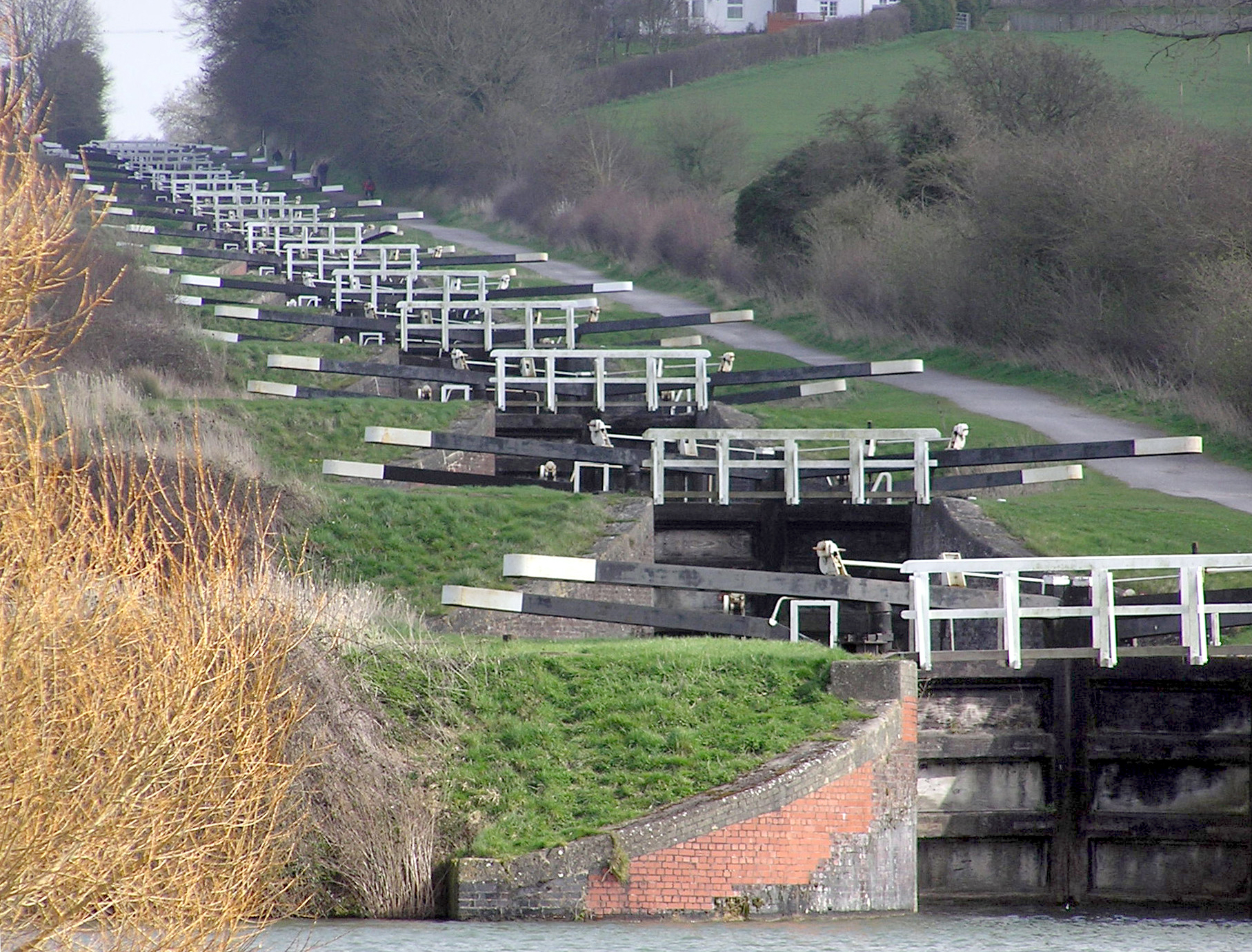
A flight of 16 locks climbs Caen Hill near Devizes, on the Kennet and Avon Canal

In 1857 the Great Western Railway built its Devizes branch line eastward to Devizes, from Holt Junction on its Chippenham-Weymouth line, to Devizes railway station just south of the market place. In 1862 GWR extended the Reading-Hungerford line westward to meet this line, providing a direct route between Paddington and the West Country through Devizes. Pans Lane Halt, southeast of the town in the suburb of Wick, opened in 1929. The building of a by-pass line through Westbury in 1900 diverted most traffic from the Devizes line and British Rail closed it in 1966; the station was demolished soon after. Today the nearest railway stations are at Melksham, Chippenham and Pewsey, although as of 2020 there is a proposal to open a station on the Westbury line at Lydeway, 2 1/2 miles (4 km) southeast of the town.

The Kennet and Avon Canal was built under the direction of John Rennie between 1794 and 1810, linking Devizes with Bristol and London. Near Devizes the canal rises 237 feet (72 m) by means of 29 locks, 16 of them in a straight line at Caen Hill. In the early days the canal was lit by gas lights at night, enabling boats to negotiate the locks at any time of day. The canal fell into disuse after the coming of the railways in the 1840s, but was restored between 1970 and 2003 for leisure uses. The Kennet and Avon Canal Trust run a museum at The Wharf in Devizes. The town is the starting point of the annual Devizes to Westminster International Canoe Marathon.

National Cycle Route 4 follows the canal towpath through the town.

== Education ==
Devizes School, a secondary school with a sixth form, takes pupils from the town and surrounding area. It is situated in the grounds of the Southbroom House estate and the grade II listed house forms its administrative core.

Brownston House, a grade I listed building, was the home of Miss Bidwell's Ladies Boarding School from 1859 to 1901. A private Devizes Grammar School was established in Heathcote House in 1874 by the Reverend S.S. Pugh and carried on until 1919 by his twin sons.

== Religious sites ==
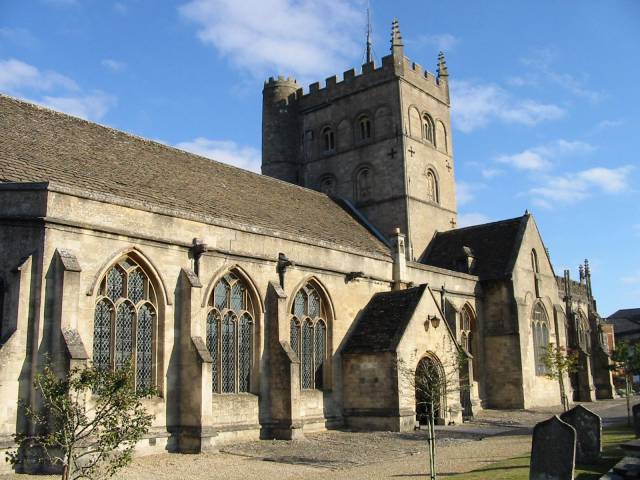
St John's Church

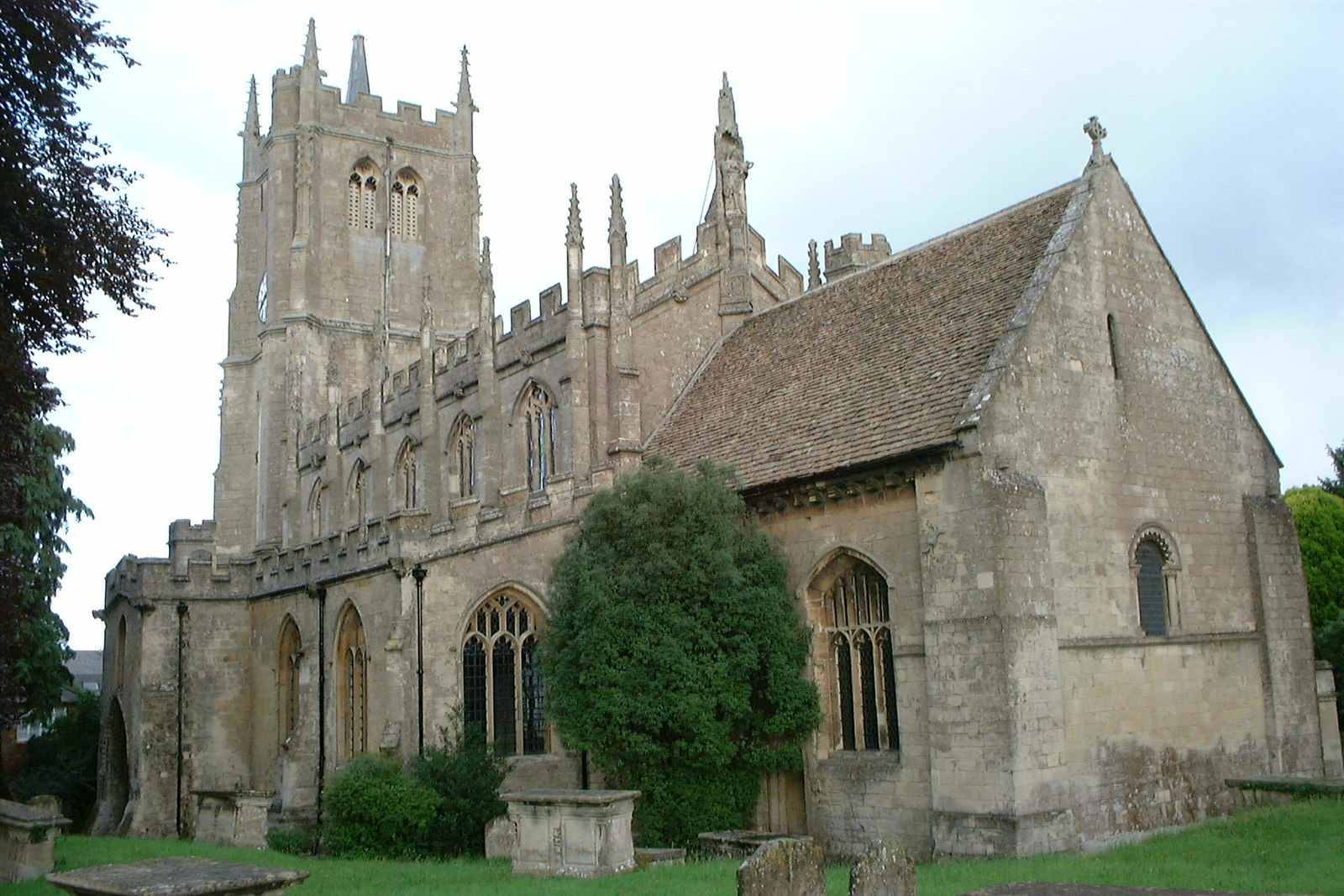
St Mary's Church

Devizes has four Church of England parish churches, and has had nonconformist congregations since the 17th century.

=== Church of England ===
The two 12th-century churches, St. John's and St. Mary's, are grade I listed buildings. They serve the parish of St. John with St. Mary which has always had one rector.

== Sport ==
Each year at Easter the 125-mile (200-kilometre) Devizes to Westminster International Canoe Marathon is held on a course between Devizes and Westminster in London.

The local association football (soccer) team is Devizes Town F.C. who play in the Hellenic League.

The local rugby union team is Devizes R.F.C. founded in 1876, known as the 'Saddlebacks' (after the Wessex Saddleback), who play in the Counties 1 Tribute Southern South (Level 7) League.

== Twin towns ==
Devizes is twinned with:

- Mayenne, France
- Oamaru, New Zealand
- Tornio, Finland
- Waiblingen, Germany

== Notable people ==
- Christopher Awdry (born 1940) author, contributor to The Railway Series started by his father, born at Devizes
- Sir Harold Walter Bailey (1899–1996), eminent scholar of Khotanese, Sanskrit and the comparative study of Iranian languages
- James Bittner (born 1982), professional footballer, played for Plymouth Argyle
- David Domoney (born 1963), Chartered Horticulturalist and television gardener, co-presenter of Love Your Garden
- Fanny Duberly (1829–1902), soldier's wife who accompanied her husband during the Crimean War and the Indian Mutiny
- Paul Fletcher (born 1965), member of the Australian Parliament, former Govt. Minister and, as of 2022, Manager of Opposition Business in the House of Representatives, born at Devizes
- A. W. Lawrence (1900–1991), classical historian and brother of T. E. Lawrence, lived in Devizes with fellow archaeologist Margaret Guido from 1986.
- Daphne Oram (1925–2003), composer
- Sir Thomas Lawrence (1769–1830), artist.
- Simon May (born 1944), songwriter
- Richard of Devizes (fl. late 12th century), English chronicler.
- Clive Robertson (born 1965), actor
- Andy Scott (born. 1949), lead guitarist of the band Sweet
- William Heath Strange (1837–1907), physician and founder of Hampstead General Hospital, now the Royal Free Hospital
- William Sylvester (1831–1920), recipient of the Victoria Cross
