= Pans Lane Halt railway station =

Former railway station in Wiltshire, England

Pans Lane Halt

General information
- Location: Devizes, Wiltshire; England
- Coordinates: 51.3451°N 1.9888°W
- Platforms: 1

Other information
- Status: Disused

History
- Original company: Great Western Railway
- Post-grouping: Great Western Railway

Key dates
- 4 March 1929: Opened as Pans Lane Bridge Halt
- 1929: Renamed Pans Lane Halt
- 18 April 1966: Closed
Location

Pans Lane Halt railway station was a railway station serving the southeast of the town of Devizes in Wiltshire, England, between 1929 and 1966. The station was on the Devizes branch line, between Devizes station and the Reading-Taunton line.

== Opening ==
The station, originally named Pans Lane Bridge Halt, opened on 4 March 1929 for the residents of south Devizes, but more importantly for the nearby Roundway Hospital, during a time when the Great Western Railway was increasing the number of halts in the South West. The station name was simplified to Pans Lane Halt later in 1929. After the completion of the eastern section of the track, the Devizes line was a main line from London to Bristol. However, the line lost out to competition and reverted to branch line status, although it was used as a back-up line to the West Country in case of emergency.

== Closure ==
Much like Devizes station, Pans Lane Halt suffered from reduced traffic after the completion of the Stert and Westbury Railway line, which bypassed Devizes.

Pans Lane Halt station was closed on 18 April 1966 and the entire Devizes Branch Line in the same year under the Beeching cuts. The station was largely destroyed in 1970, although the clay-surfaced platform and retaining sleepers, stone walling, and the brick chimney stack belonging to the permanent way hut situated at the down end of the platform, survived until the site was infilled and used for gardens.

The road bridge, rebuilt in the 1960s, over the line near the halt is still in use today but the past presence of a track is no longer visible after infilling in the late 1980s.

Preceding station	Disused railways	Following station
Patney and Chirton; Line and station closed	Great Western Railway; Devizes Branch Line	Devizes; Line and station closed
