= Rowde =

Village in Wiltshire, England

Coordinates: 51.364°N 2.032°W

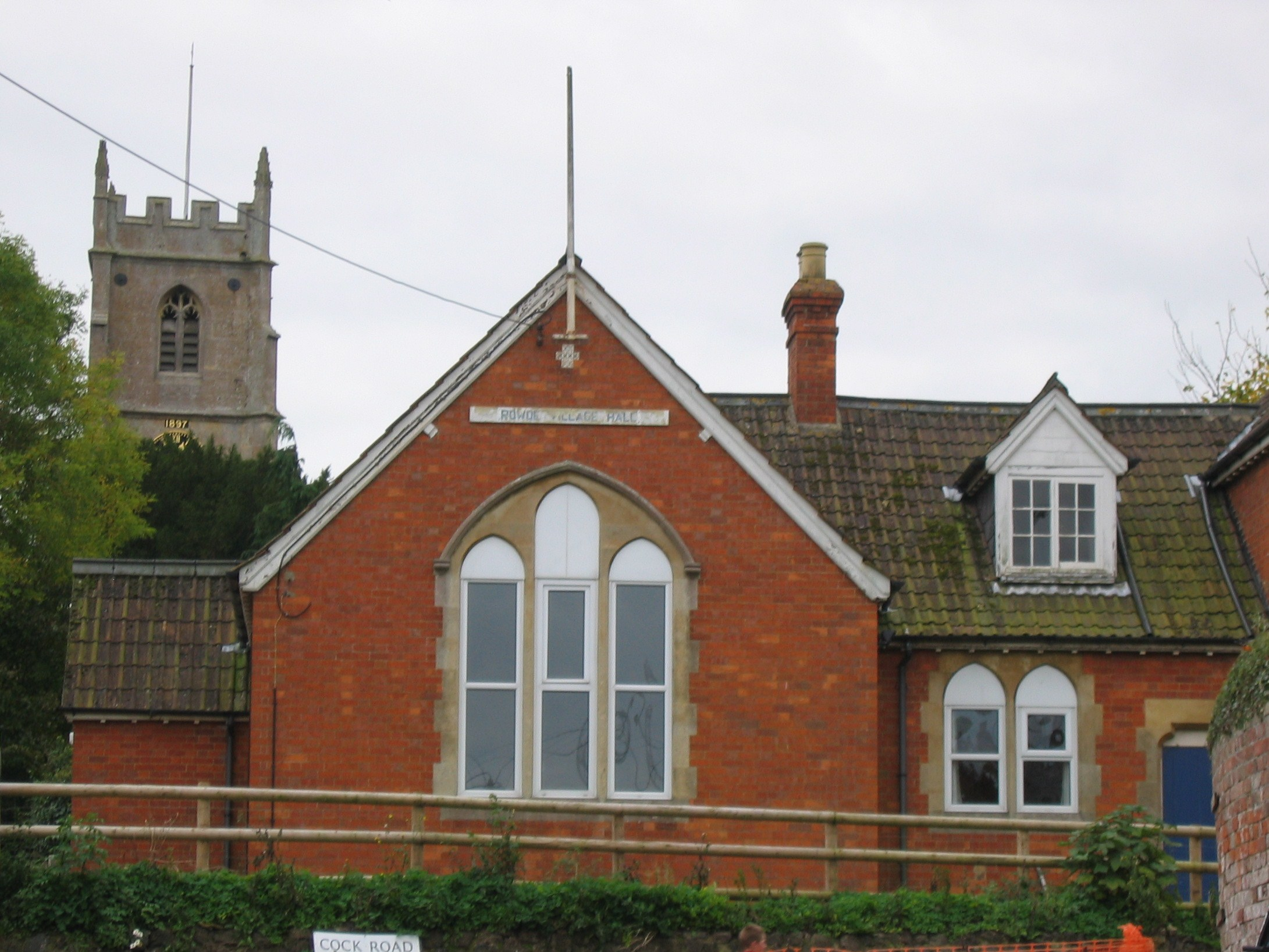
- Village hall with parish church behind it

- Location within Wiltshire
- Interactive map of Rowde
- Population: 1,382 (in 2011)
- OS grid reference: ST979627
- Unitary authority: Wiltshire
- Ceremonial county: Wiltshire
- Region: South West
- Country: England
- Sovereign state: United Kingdom
- Post town: DEVIZES
- Postcode district: SN10
- Dialling code: 01380
- Police: Wiltshire
- Fire: Dorset and Wiltshire
- Ambulance: South Western
- UK Parliament: Melksham and Devizes
- Website: Village

Rowde (/raʊd/) is a village and civil parish in the English county of Wiltshire, on the A342 about 1.7 miles (2.7 km) northwest of Devizes. The parish includes the hamlet of Tanis.

== History ==
The village now mainly consists of modern brick-built houses, but a number of 17th-century buildings still remain in the centre of the village, including the George & Dragon public house. This was pre-dated in the village by another pub, a timber framed and thatched building that was destroyed by fire in 1938; a replacement, the Cross Keys now stands in its place.

On the outskirts of Rowde are the Caen Hill flight of locks of the Kennet and Avon Canal. The canal rises 237 feet by means of 29 locks, 16 of them in a straight line at Caen Hill. The canal was constructed between 1794 and 1810 and served to link Devizes with Bristol and London. It fell into disuse after the coming of the railway but has been restored, and is now used for leisure purposes.

The small unsignposted hamlet of Rowde Hill, consisting of around 10 houses, lies around 1.3 miles (2.1 km) west of the village towards Sells Green and Melksham, at the junction of The Common and Berhills Lane.

== Amenities ==
The parish has a village hall, built in 1887 as Rowde Reading Room and Coffee Tavern.

Rowde C of E Primary Academy serves Rowde and nearby villages. Built in 2006, it replaced a school in Marsh Lane which was built in 1841 and extended in 1907. Silverwood School, to the north of the village, is a school for children with special educational needs, built around a country house of 1812.

The Church of England parish church is dedicated to St. Matthew and has a 15th-century tower, the rest having been rebuilt in 1832–3 to designs of Henry Goodridge. It has a font designed in 1850 by Sir Matthew Digby Wyatt, architect, who was born in Rowde and lived for a time at Rowdeford House (now the home of Silverwood School). The six bells in the tower were cast in 1870 by John Taylor & Co. The building was Grade II* listed in 1962. Today the parish is part of the Rowde and Bromham benefice, which also covers Sandy Lane.

There is one restaurant in Rowde, "The George & Dragon". A previous pub, "The Cross Keys" is now closed and is being converted into a "Premier Store", which will be the village's only shop when it opens.

== Local government ==
Rowde is a civil parish with an elected parish council. It is in the area of the Wiltshire Council unitary authority, which is responsible for all significant local government functions.

== Former railway ==
The Devizes Branch Line was built through the parish in 1857 and a small station – Bromham and Rowde Halt – was added in 1909 at Sells Green, to the west just outside the parish. The line was closed in 1966.
