= Bromham and Rowde Halt railway station =

Former railway station in Wiltshire, England

Coordinates: 51.3572°N 2.0659°W

Bromham and Rowde Halt
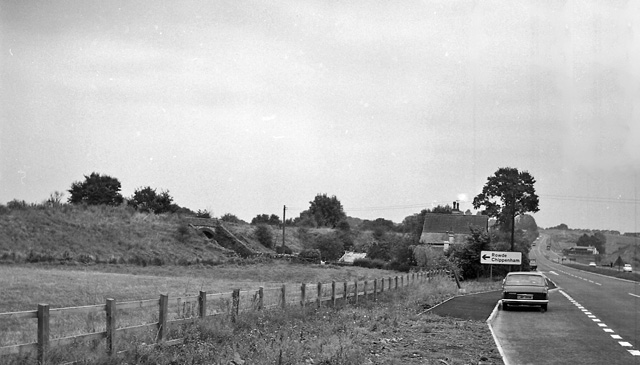
- Disused embankment near the A361, about 1.5 miles east of the site of the station, in September 1973

General information
- Location: Sells Green, Wiltshire; England
- Platforms: 1

Other information
- Status: Disused

History
- Original company: Great Western Railway
- Pre-grouping: Great Western Railway
- Post-grouping: Great Western Railway

Key dates
- 22 February 1909: Opened
- 18 April 1966: Closed
Location

Bromham and Rowde Halt was the railway station serving Bromham and Rowde in Wiltshire, England between 1909 and 1966. The station was a stop on the Devizes Branch Line, between Seend and Devizes.

The single-platform halt was at Sells Green in the north-east of Seend parish, close to the Devizes–Melksham road. It handled vegetables grown in the Bromham area, as well as milk.

After the completion of the Devizes line in 1858, the junction at Holt allowed the fastest route from London to the West Country. However, the Devizes line lost to competition and returned to a branch line in 1900.

== Closure ==
Bromham and Rowde suffered from reduced traffic after the completion of the Patney and Chirton-Westbury line, that by-passed the Devizes Branch Line to shorten the London to Plymouth journey by five miles. As a result, Bromham and Rowde later lost its stationmaster in 1952.

The line and the halt were closed in 1966 under the Beeching cuts and the station was demolished in 1970.

Preceding station	Disused railways	Following station
Devizes; Line and station closed	Great Western Railway; Devizes Branch Line	Seend; Line and station closed
