= Seend =

Village in Wiltshire, England

Coordinates: 51.349°N 2.081°W

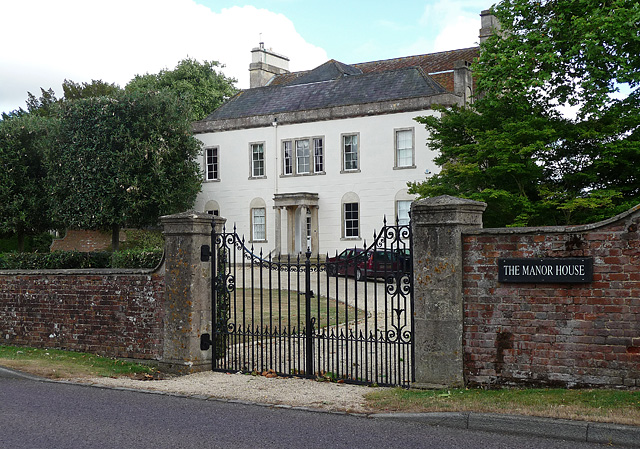
- Manor House, Seend

- Location within Wiltshire
- Interactive map of Seend
- Population: 1,132 (in 2011)
- OS grid reference: ST945611
- Unitary authority: Wiltshire
- Ceremonial county: Wiltshire
- Region: South West
- Country: England
- Sovereign state: United Kingdom
- Post town: Melksham
- Postcode district: SN12
- Dialling code: 01380
- Police: Wiltshire
- Fire: Dorset and Wiltshire
- Ambulance: South Western
- UK Parliament: Melksham and Devizes
- Website: Parish Council

Seend is a village and civil parish about 3 miles (5 km) southeast of the market town of Melksham, Wiltshire, England. It lies about 3.5 miles (6 km) west of Devizes and 5.5 miles (9 km) northeast of the county town of Trowbridge. The parish includes the sub-village of Seend Cleeve and the hamlets of Inmarsh, Martinslade, Seend Head, Sells Green and The Stocks (the latter being contiguous with Seend Cleeve).

Seend village is on a hilltop more than 90 metres (300 ft) above sea level. The hill is bordered to the west and south by Semington Brook, a tributary of the River Avon, and to the east by Summerham Brook, which is a tributary of Semington Brook. The village's High Street is the A361 Trowbridge-Devizes road; the A365 links the A361 with Melksham and passes through Sells Green.

== Toponym ==
The village name has had earlier forms, notably in the 17th century: Seene (1602—1635), Scene (1650), Seend Vulgo (1670) and Seen (1675). The name is from Old English "sende" meaning a sandy place.

== Manor ==
The Domesday Book of 1086 does not mention a manor of Seend. In the 11th century Seend may have been part of the royal manor of Melksham. The earliest known record of the tenancy of the manor of Seend dates from 1190 when it was held by Wigan of Cherburgh. Wigan's descendants held the manor until 1297 when John of Cherburgh granted it to Hugh le Despenser, 1st Earl of Winchester. After Hugh was hanged in 1326, Seend was granted to Queen Isabella as part of her dower.

In 1331, Seend manor was granted to Edward de Bohun, twin brother of William de Bohun, 1st Earl of Northampton. William and Edward were two of the younger sons of Humphrey de Bohun, 4th Earl of Hereford. Edward had died by 1337, when the Crown granted Seend manor to Hugh le Despencer, Baron le Despencer, subject to the life interest of Edward's widow Margaret. In 1341 Margaret died and livery of seisin was granted to Humphrey de Bohun, 6th Earl of Hereford. After Humphrey's death in 1361, Seend was held successively by Humphrey de Bohun, 7th Earl of Hereford until his death in 1373 and the 7th earl's widow until her death in 1419.

In 1421, Seend Manor was granted to Anne of Gloucester, Countess of Stafford. In 1431, the countess placed the manor in trust for her nephew Humphrey of Lancaster, 1st Duke of Gloucester. The Duke died heirless in 1447, and by 1461, Seend had passed to John Bourchier, 1st Baron Berners, a son of Anne of Gloucester's remarriage to William Bourchier, 1st Count of Eu. John Bourchier's grandson John Bourchier, 2nd Baron Berners inherited Seend in 1447 and mortgaged it in 1506. The second Baron died in 1533 and his executors sold Seend manor to William Sharington of Lacock in 1539. William left Seend to his brother Henry in 1553, who left it to his daughter Grace and son-in-law Sir Anthony Mildmay in 1581. Mildmay died in 1617, and Grace in 1620, leaving Seend to their daughter Mary and son-in-law Francis Fane, who was created 1st Earl of Westmorland in 1624. Seend remained in the family until Charles Fane, 3rd Earl of Westmorland sold it to Sir Richard Blake in 1668.

Sir Richard died in 1683, and his widow Elizabeth married Edward Hearst. They mortgaged Seend in 1690. After their deaths, Seend passed to Elizabeth and Sir Richard's daughter Mary, who was married to a Robert Dormer. Robert and Mary left Seend to their daughter Elizabeth and her husband John Fortescue Aland, who in 1746 was created Baron Fortescue of Credan in the Peerage of Ireland. The last known record of the manor dates from 1723.

== Parish church ==
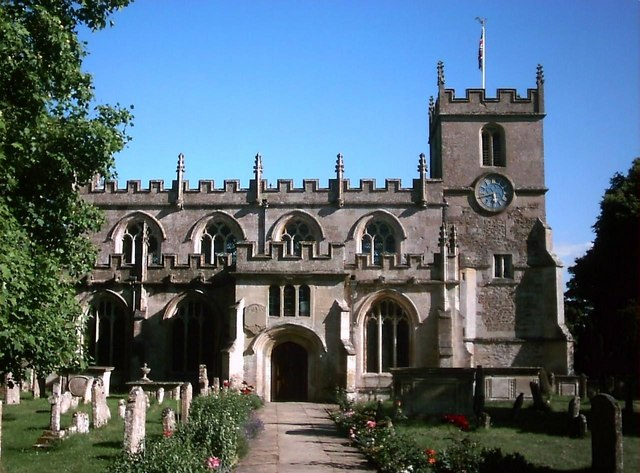
Church of the Holy Cross

Seend was a chapelry of the ecclesiastical parish of Melksham by the latter part of the 13th century, when Hugh of Trowbridge had succeeded Ingram as capellano parochiali ("parish chaplain"). Seend had its own churchwardens from 1663, and raised its own poor rate from 1734. When it was made a separate parish and perpetual curacy in 1873, it was stated that Seend already had full rights to conduct baptisms, churchings, marriages and burials.

The Church of England parish church of the Holy Cross is built of rubble stone faced with ashlar. The oldest work is the lower parts of the low west tower, which predates the late-15th-century Perpendicular Gothic nave and its high clerestory. The Perpendicular Gothic north aisle – described as "showy" by Orbach – is also late 15th century, paid for by the clothier John Stokes (died 1498). There are memorial brasses to Stokes and his wife in the north aisle. Over the chancel arch are traces of either a carved rood or a wall painting of the Crucifixion.

Holy Cross has a west gallery that was built early in the 18th century. It bears two dates: 1706 and 1726. The chancel was rebuilt in 1876 to designs by the architect A. J. Style. He also designed the ornate Gothic reredos and pulpit, in stone and marble; the pulpit was carved by Nathaniel Hitch. The 1884 east window is by Clayton and Bell. Restoration in 1889 included rebuilding the west half of the south aisle. There is an octagonal stone font from the 15th century, and another, oval, from the 18th century.

By 1553 the tower had three bells; it now has a ring of six. Four of the bells, including the treble, were cast in 1636 by Roger I Purdue of Bristol. The fifth bell was cast in 1793 by Robert and James Wells of Aldbourne. In 1880 Mears and Stainbank of the Whitechapel Bell Foundry cast the present tenor bell and recast one of Purdue's 1636 bells. In 1912 W. & J. Taylor of Loughborough recast Purdue's treble bell.

Monuments in the church include a fine marble figure of a woman by an urn, made by John Ford of Bath, to Rev George Husey (died 1741); and Gothic memorials including two by William Osmond, to Wadham Locke MP of Rowdeford House (died 1835) and his grandson, also Wadham (died 1841, age 12). The church was designated as Grade I listed in 1962, and in 1987 the iron gates at the entrance to the churchyard – of 1812 with corniced ashlar piers and lamp above – were listed at Grade II.

The parish was united with Bulkington in 1971, and Poulshot was added in 1995. Today the parish is part of the Wellsprings benefice, which also covers the parishes of Bulkington, Potterne, Poulshot, and Worton & Marston.

== Chapels ==
There were both Quaker believers and Presbyterian ministers in the Seend area by about 1648. In 1672, Benjamin Rutty of Seend was licensed to be a Presbyterian teacher and to use his house for that purpose. By 1717, Seend had a congregation of 52 Presbyterians, to whom a minister from Devizes preached once a month.

In 1749 John Wesley preached at Seend. Thereafter, non-conformist Christians in Seend seem to have become part of the Methodist movement. Construction of Seend Methodist Chapel began in 1774 and was completed in 1775; it was opened by John Wesley. The chapel was registered for marriages in 1854. The building is in red brick with ashlar stone quoins and lancet windows in an Early English style, grouped in pairs and triplets. After its congregation dwindled, the chapel (which had no water or heating) was closed in March 2020.

There was also a Primitive Methodist chapel at Seend Cleeve, which was closed in 1979.

== Secular buildings ==
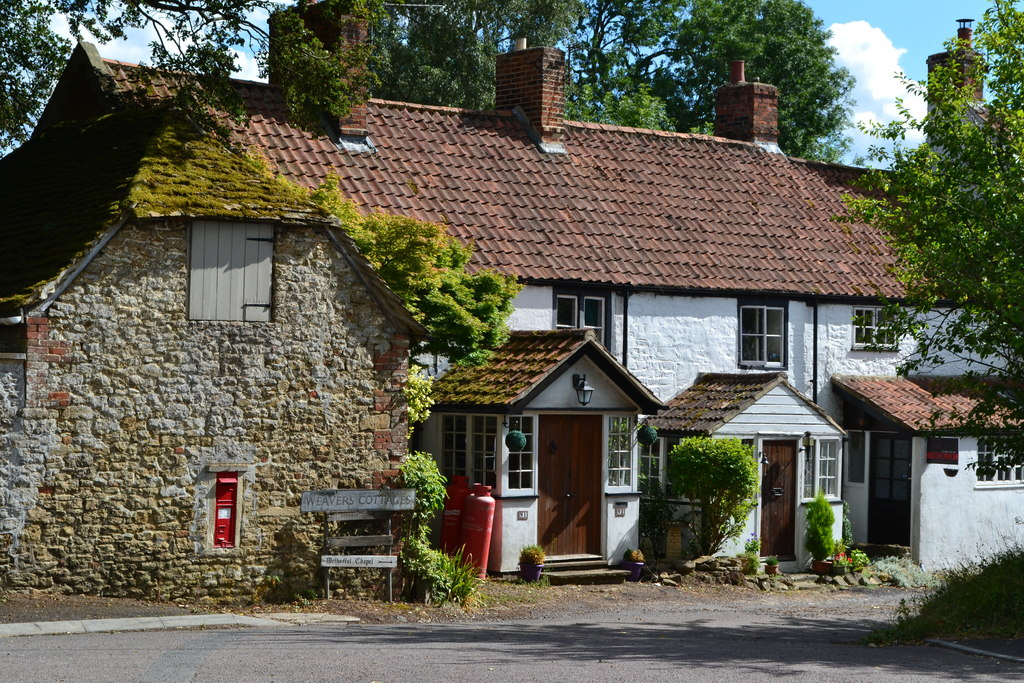
Weavers Cottages, Seend

Seend Manor House was built in 1768 for the Awdry family. The house has two storeys, five bays, and an Ionic porch, and in 1962 was designated as Grade II* listed.

Seend House, west of the parish church and also Grade II* listed, was built in the early 19th century. It is an ashlar-faced building of three storeys and six bays, with a porch of paired Tuscan columns. Two lodges are each fronted with four Tuscan columns.

Hill Farm house in the High Street dates from the 15th century and has partly original timber framing including a cruck. It has brick nogging and a stone slate roof. Also on the High Street, Dial House has its origins in the 15th century with its ashlar chimney breast, but the rest is 18th-century red-brick facings. Moiety Manor is a 16th-century timber-framed and painted-brick farmhouse in Spout Lane.

Seend Green House, near the east end of the village, was in existence before the end of the 17th century. It is a plain, ashlar-faced building of three storeys and seven bays. Its porch at the side with pairs of Tuscan columns was added slightly later.

== Economic history ==
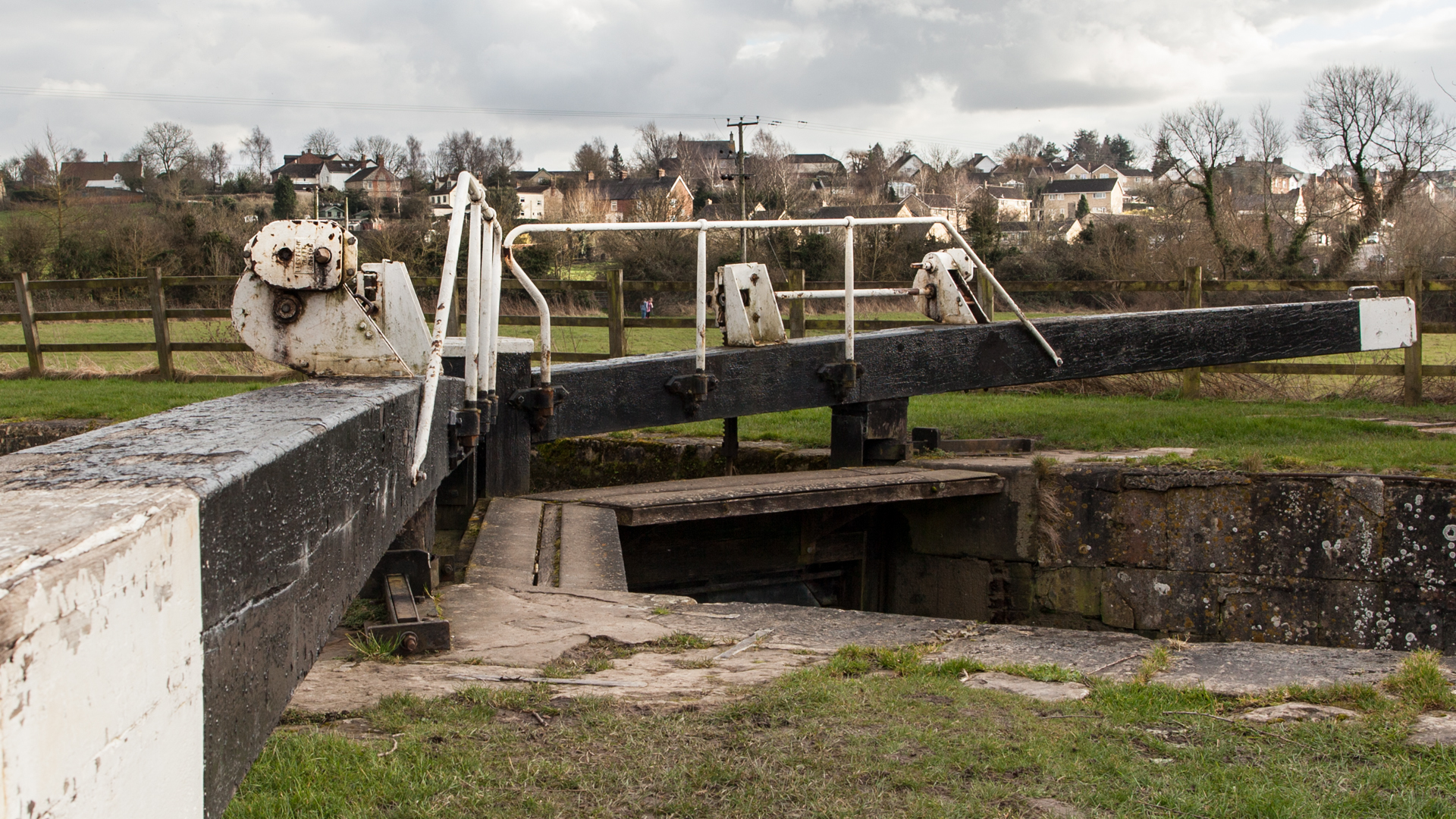
The Kennet and Avon Canal passes below Seend hill; here Seend Cleeve is the backdrop

In 1666 the antiquarian John Aubrey observed an iron ore field at Seend and in 1684 he noted that Seend had a chalybeate well that attracted "much company". The ore field was evidently the source of the iron oxide in the chalybeate waters. A chalybeate spring at Seend was discovered or rediscovered in 1813. In 1815 a saline spring was discovered and a spa company was founded, which built a pump room and houses for visitors. The Spa prospered until 1822.

The Kennet and Avon Canal was built between 1794 and 1810. It passes about 0.4 miles (640 m) north of Seend village and even closer to Seend Cleeve.

The Great Western Railway opened the Devizes Branch Line in 1857, passing about 0.6 miles (970 m) north of Seend village, and in 1858 Seend station was built to serve the area. Bromham and Rowde Halt was opened in 1909 at Sells Green, close to the north bank of the canal; the name was chosen because freight was expected to come from the horticultural area around Bromham. The line and stations were closed in 1966.

The opening of the railway encouraged quarrying of the iron ore field, which began in the middle of the 19th century and continued intermittently for the next century or so. 77,984 tons of brown haematite were quarried between 1855 and 1861 and a further 86,443 tons between 1871 and 1874. Quarrying was renewed during the Second World War and was still continuing in 1950. Seend Ironstone Quarry and Road Cutting is now a Geological Site of Special Scientific Interest.

== School ==
Seend Church School was built by Thomas Bruges in 1832 and opened the following year. In 1859 a report criticised the schoolmaster and schoolmistress as uncertificated and the building as damp and unsatisfactory. In 1869 a Government grant paid for a new school building and by 1872 the school was receiving regular Government funding. Attendance grew from 77 in 1872 to 132 in 1893 and 108 children and 56 infants in 1910. Thereafter attendance declined to 68 children and 32 infants in 1938. There were 114 children of all ages in 1950. It is now Seend Church of England Voluntary Aided Primary School.

== Amenities ==
The parish has three public houses: the Brewery Inn at Seend Cleeve, the Barge Inn at the canalside below Seend Cleeve, and the Three Magpies at Sells Green. There is a post office/shop on the High Street, a Community Centre with a bar, and a sports field.

== Notable people ==
Mary Webb (1697–1768) was born at Seend; her mother Elizabeth Somner was a daughter of John Somner (or Sumner), who owned Seend Green House (now Seend Park) from the 1660s. After marrying Edward Seymour in 1716 or 1717, she became in 1750 Mary Seymour, Duchess of Somerset. She had the house largely rebuilt in 1760.

Cleeve House was bought in 1883 by William Heward Bell. His children with his wife Hannah included Cory (1875–1961), army officer in the Second Boer War and First World War, elected twice as MP for Devizes, and High Sheriff in 1932; and Clive (1881–1964), the art critic and writer, who married the artist Vanessa Stephen, sister of the author Virginia Woolf.

Antiques dealer and TV presenter Paul Martin and family moved to Seend in 2007.

== In media ==
The church parish (comprising Seend, Bulkington and Poulshot) was the subject of a television documentary series A Country Parish, shown in 2003 on BBC2.

== Sources ==
- Pevsner, Nikolaus; Cherry, Bridget (revision) (1975) [1963]. Wiltshire. The Buildings of England. Harmondsworth: Penguin Books. pp. 464–465. ISBN 0-14-071026-4.
- Chettle, H.F.; Powell, W.R.; Spalding, P.A.; Tillott, P.M. (1953). Pugh, R.B.; Crittall, Elizabeth (eds.). A History of the County of Wiltshire, Volume 7. Victoria County History. University of London. pp. 91–121 – via British History Online.
