= Southbroom House =

House in Devizes, Wiltshire, England

Coordinates: 51°21′2.09″N 1°59′14.38″W

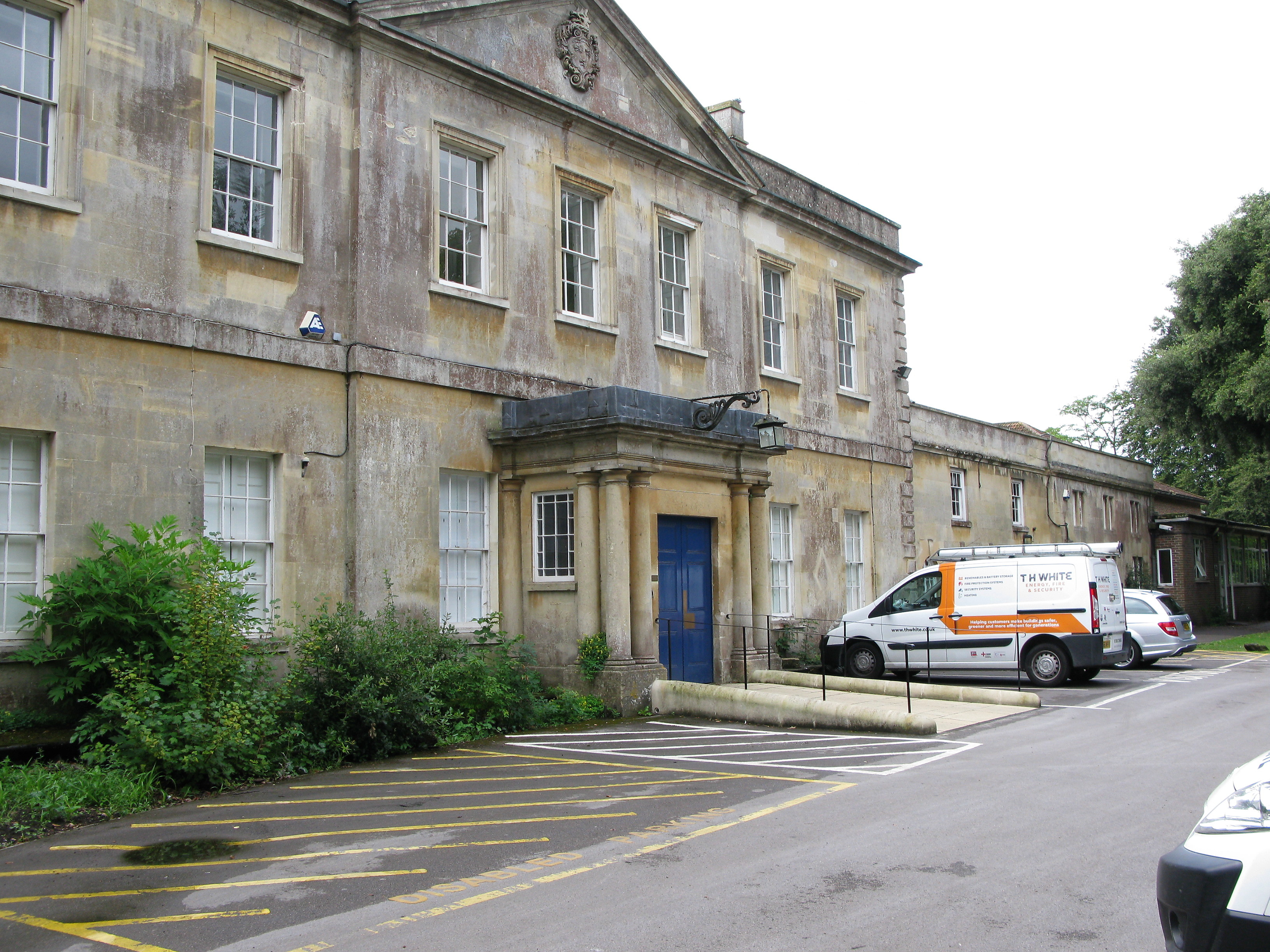
Part of northwest front, 2018

Southbroom House is an 18th-century Grade II* listed house in Devizes, Wiltshire, England. The house and its grounds were bought by Wiltshire County Council in 1925 for use as a school, and today the house forms part of Devizes School, the town's secondary school.

== History ==
The Southbroom area, south-east of Devizes town centre, was part of Bishops Cannings parish until boundary changes in 1894 and 1934 brought it into the town.

The first known owner of Southbroom House was John Drew (or Trew), a wealthy clothier from Devon. When John Drew occupied the estate in 1501 it consisted of the house, a dovehouse, a small park, orchards, and gardens. A small pond was thought to have existed on the estate at that time although this was not shown in later records. This could have some connection with Drews Pond, which is on the outskirts of Devizes.

The estate passed to John Drew's grandson who was also called John. When he died in 1614, the estate passed to his son, Robert. For unknown reasons Sir Charles Lloyd burnt down the house in 1645. Robert died in the fire leaving the dovehouse, etc., to his widow Elizabeth. Their son, John Drew, died soon after inheriting the estate, leaving the remaining property to his widow who, in 1664, married Sir Henry Andrews, 1st Baronet, of Lathbury.

The bulk of the estate stayed in the Drew family until 1680 when it was bought by John Eyles, a London merchant, who was Lord Mayor of London for part of 1688.

In 1773, a new house was built on the original site by Edward Eyles, with imported Bath labour. A fire occurred in the new building in 1779 but did not destroy the whole house. The property descended to Edward's daughter Maria who married George Heathcote of London. Maria was born on 12 June 1706; she married in 1724 and died in 1792. She is buried in St John's Church cemetery in Devizes. George Heathcote became Lord Mayor of London in 1742.

Devizes School, which now occupies Southbroom House, is organised into four houses, one of which is called Heathcote House, another 18th-century house nearby.

George and Maria's son Josiah Eyles Heathcote died in 1811 and the estate was sold in 1812 to William Salmon. The park (then 22 acres) was by this time encircled by trees and rare plants and adorned by ‘romantic' walls. The whole estate while in the possession of William Salmon amounted to 269 acres (1.09 km^{2}).

William was succeeded by W. W. Salmon, who left the town in 1828. Then or later the whole estate was sold to George Watson-Taylor of Erlestoke. Some accounts say that his son Simon Watson-Taylor was the occupier in 1880 but other accounts say that it was owned by Robert Parry Nisbet (1793–1882) who owned the estate in 1841, and is referenced to live there on the occasion of his marriage in 1847. His crest is on one of the two lodges, the other of which was demolished in 1968.

In 1913 and 1914, R. H. Caird owned the property. He left the town and sold the estate, which then consisted of the house, a private golf course, a park with a small maze, and rare trees and plants to Sir Horace Westropp McMahon. The next owners of the house were Wiltshire County Council, who bought it in 1926. They were succeeded by Wiltshire Council in 2009.

== The house ==
In the days when the Eyles family owned the house the attics had one main use, to provide a place to sleep for the servants. Each night the butler would bring a ladder to the attic entrance so that the servants could go up to their room to sleep. He would then remove it until the following morning when again he would bring the ladder and allow the servants to get down.

The house consisted of a dining hall, library, study, drawing room, servants quarters, morning room, bedrooms, bathroom and conservatory. Also there were extensive gardens and shrubberies.

The house was considerably altered and extended in the 19th and 20th centuries for use as part of a school. The original building dating mainly from 1773 is of Bath stone ashlar and consists of a two-story central block flanked by much lower service wings. The wings have been considerably altered but retain a few original round-headed openings on the ground floor with some oval windows above.

The house was recorded as Grade II* listed in 1954.

== Schools ==
Wiltshire County Council purchased Southbroom House in 1925, together with 7 acres (28,000 m^{2}) of grounds. The house was adapted as a senior school for children over the age of eight in the southern part of the town. The adjacent Heathcote House, formerly the private Devizes Grammar School from 1874 to 1919, was used as the Headmaster's residence of the new school, and in 1929 a large classroom at the rear was adapted as a Domestic Science Room. By 1930, there was a 'housecraft centre' near the school and a large garden for the pupils to work in. In 1936, a new block was added to the Heathcote House section to form a Handicraft Centre and Science Laboratory. The school continued to expand and in 1937 a kitchen and canteen were opened to provide hot dinners for the children.

Early in the Second World War, the school's buildings were converted into a reception and dispersal centre for evacuees. The Devizes Day Nursery was built in the grounds as an emergency measure; this became redundant in 1947 and provided extra accommodation for the school. In 1949, the school became a secondary modern with the name of Southbroom Secondary School. In 1950, there were 452 pupils and numbers rose to 590 aged between 8 and 15 by 1954. The school was considered too small and was enlarged in 1956, and again in 1964. In 1969 Southbroom Secondary School was merged with Devizes Grammar School to form Devizes Comprehensive School, which later became Devizes School.

As of 1980, Southbroom House was used mainly for school staff offices and the staff common room.

== Sources ==
- Downes, Jason (1980). The History of Southbroom House 1501-1980.
