= Devizes School =

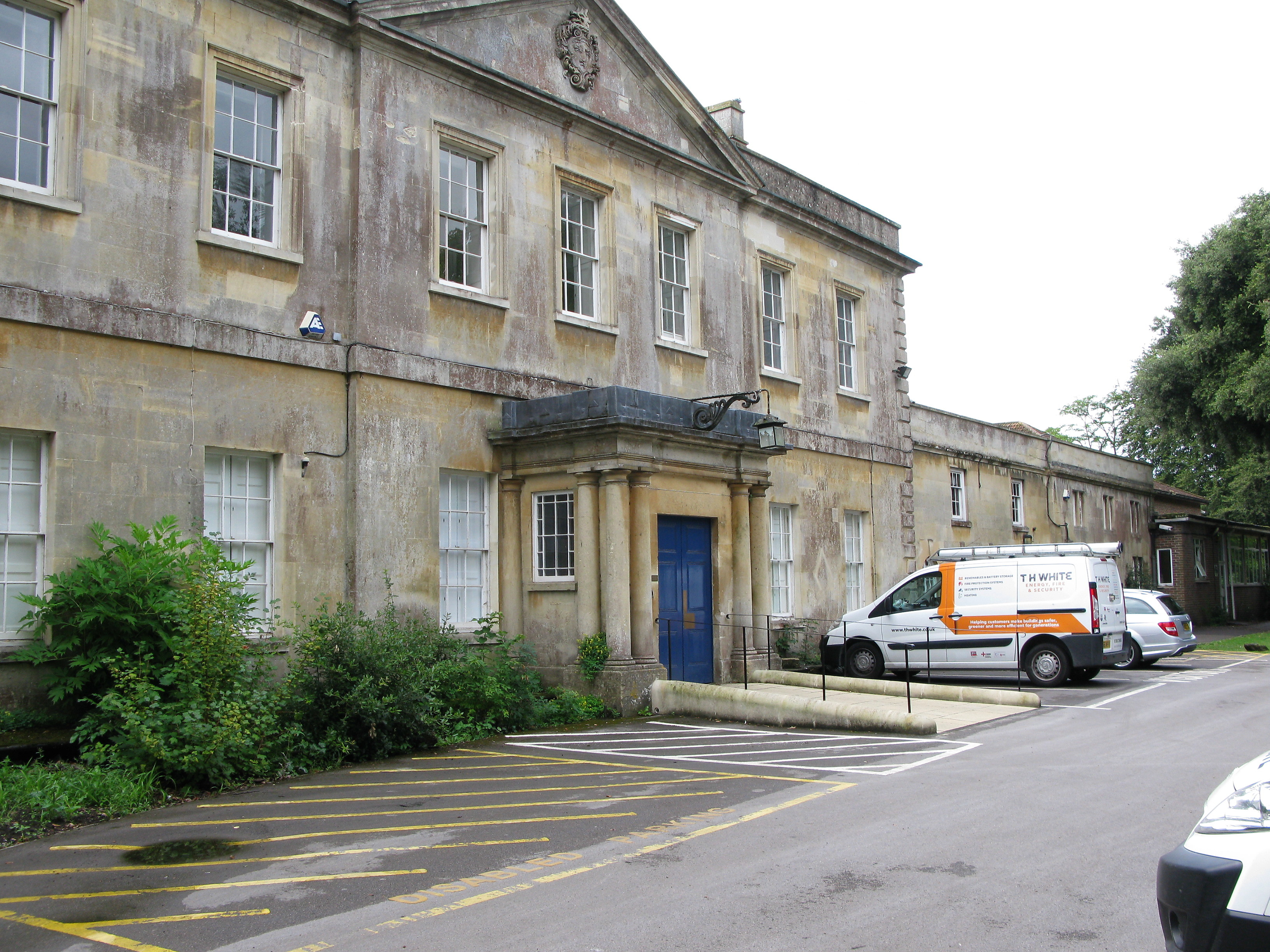
- Southbroom House, Devizes School

Location
- The Green; Devizes, Wiltshire, SN10 3AG; England; 51°21′02″N 1°59′15″W

Information
- Type: Academy
- Established: 1969
- Department for Education URN: 138630 Tables
- Ofsted: Reports
- Executive Headteacher: David Cooper
- Gender: Coeducational
- Age: 11 to 18
- Enrolment: 1,211 (November 2023)
- Houses: Avebury, Roundway, Silbury
- Website: www.devizesschool.co.uk

Devizes School is a mixed comprehensive school in Devizes, Wiltshire, England, for children and young people aged 11 to 18. The school is near the centre of the town, next to the Leisure Centre, between the A342 and A360. In September 2012, the school became an academy, and it joined The White Horse Federation Multi-academy Trust in 2017. The school is the only secondary school in the town of Devizes and also serves many surrounding villages. Built around the Georgian Southbroom House, the school now comprises additional teaching blocks of a more modern style, set within its own sports fields. Ofsted has graded the school Good in each of the past six visits, the latest in October 2024.

== Admissions ==
The school has been awarded specialist Sports College and ICT College status.

== History ==
The school was formed in 1969 by the merging of two schools to form a comprehensive school. These were the co-educational Devizes Grammar School, built on Bath Road in 1906, and the Southbroom Secondary School (at first a Wiltshire County Council senior school, later a secondary modern) which was established in 1925 around Southbroom House, a Grade II* listed mansion built in 1773.

The new school used the Southbroom site; the Grammar School's lower school was taken over by St. Peter's School (which left the site in 2012) while the upper school, Braeside, became a residential education centre. The Southbroom buildings were enlarged and by January 1973 there were 1,373 pupils on the school roll. Further new buildings were erected and in 2002 there were 1,065 pupils with a sixth form of around 150.

In 1980, two Chipperfield's Circus lions found their way onto the grounds of Devizes.

On 8 August 1990, the Queen attended the school to open the swimming pool at the adjacent Devizes Leisure Centre.

Shelley Rudman, the Olympic skeleton silver medallist, worked at the school as a classroom manager.

In February 2005, a 52-year-old builder, David Evans, was taunted by some teenage boys at the school. He confronted two of them, pushing two of them. Next day the boys reported him to their headmaster, Malcolm Irons, who reported him to the police. Next day, Evans hanged himself.

In May 2013, the sixth form moved into their new, enlarged Sixth Form Centre. Phil Bevan was appointed head teacher in April 2016 and the school became a member of The White Horse Federation, a multi-academy trust, in February 2017.

Plans were put forward in December 2019 to sell 5.7 acres of the school's playing fields, to be used for housing, resulting in a day of student protest on the school grounds. Private Eye reported that the school had a large deficit and a repairs backlog when it joined the federation.

== Academic performance ==
Results in 2018:

At A-level, 65.7% of the grades were A*–C and 25.9% were grades A*–B.

At GCSE level, 54.2% of students achieved 9-4 grades in English and Mathematics.

== Alumni ==
Devizes Grammar School

- Ian Bishop (born 1962), Anglican priest, bishop of Thetford
- Sandra Howard, novelist, former model and the wife of Michael Howard
