= Devizes railway station =

Former railway station in Wiltshire, England

Coordinates: 51.35231°N 1.9991°W

Devizes
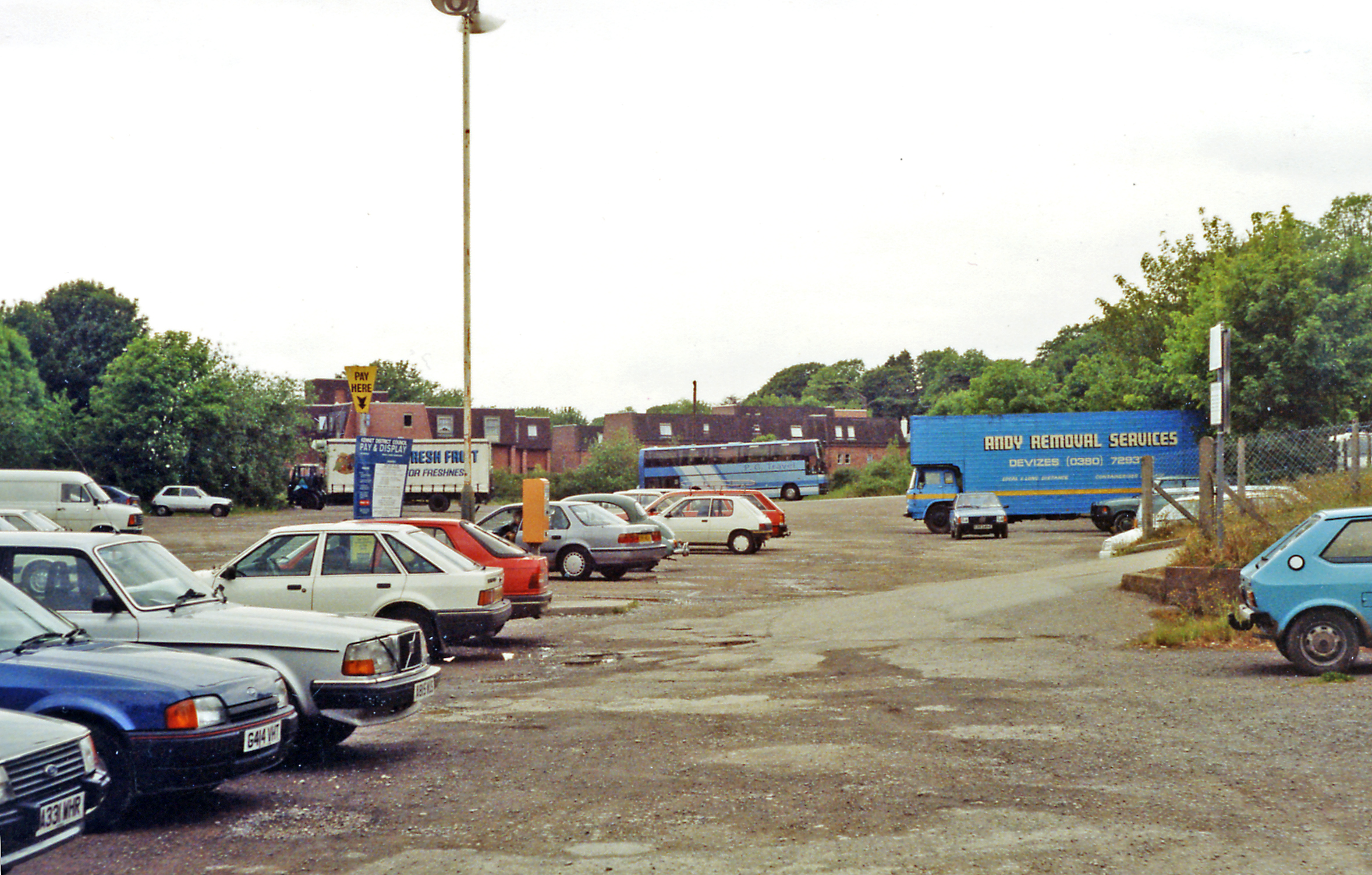
- Site of the station in June 1991

General information
- Location: Devizes, Wiltshire; England
- Line: Devizes Branch Line
- Platforms: 3

Other information
- Status: Disused

History
- Original company: Wilts, Somerset and Weymouth Railway
- Pre-grouping: Great Western Railway
- Post-grouping: Great Western Railway

Key dates
- 1 July 1857: Opened
- 18 April 1966: Closed
Location

Devizes railway station was the railway station serving Devizes in Wiltshire, England between 1857 and 1966. The station was on the Devizes branch line, between Pans Lane Halt and Bromham & Rowde.

== Early plans ==
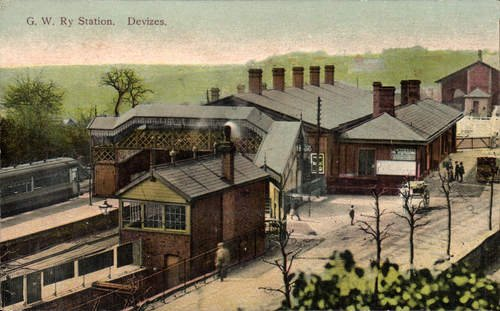
Devizes station around 1900

The idea of having a railway station in Devizes was first conceived in 1830 before the Great Western Railway (GWR) had begun to construct their main lines. Devizes was regularly considered by the GWR as a main stop on its London to Bristol Line but lost out to Swindon due to its smaller population and lower growth rate. A station in Devizes was needed to support industry and agriculture in the town, as its only transport route was the Kennet and Avon Canal, opened in 1810.

A branch to Devizes was included in plans for the Wilts, Somerset and Weymouth Railway, authorised by Parliament in 1845, but that company was sold to the GWR in 1850.

== West from Devizes ==
In 1854 the GWR finally began to build from near Holt Junction on the former WS&WR line eastward to Devizes, completing the branch in 1857.

Devizes station opened on 1 July 1857. After starting with seven trains a day, services were reduced to four a day, most probably due to overinflated claims of traffic before the line was built.

== East from Devizes ==
In 1862, the GWR extended its Reading-Hungerford line westward via Pewsey to Devizes, reaching the station through a tunnel under Devizes Castle. This began the busiest period for the station, with trains running from London through Devizes to either Bath and Bristol or the West Country.

Traffic on the line reduced from 1900 after the GWR opened the Stert and Westbury Railway between Patney and Chirton and Westbury, which by-passed the steep gradients of Devizes and provided a faster route from London to Plymouth.

== Closure ==
The Devizes line and all its stations were closed in April 1966 under the Beeching Axe; the track was taken up, and the station buildings were demolished in 1970.

Today there is little trace of a railway station in Devizes. The road bridge over the old Pans Lane Halt station and the footbridge at Devizes remain. The tunnel built under Devizes Castle has been bricked up at one end and is a commercial property at the other end (a shooting range as of 2011). In place of the station, there is now a public car park and a new property development, both on Station Road.

== Future plans ==
In 2018, proposals were made for a station at Clock Inn Park, Lydeway, 2 1/2 miles (4 km) southeast of Devizes where the Reading–Taunton line is crossed by the A342 road. In 2020 the project, referred to by some as Devizes Gateway, received funding from the Department for Transport for a feasibility study. In early 2023, Network Rail continued to work on a more detailed study with assistance from Wiltshire Council and Devizes Development Partnership.

Preceding station	Disused railways	Following station
Pans Lane Halt; Line and station closed	Great Western Railway; Devizes Branch Line	Bromham and Rowde Halt; Line and station closed
