= Weymouth Wizard =

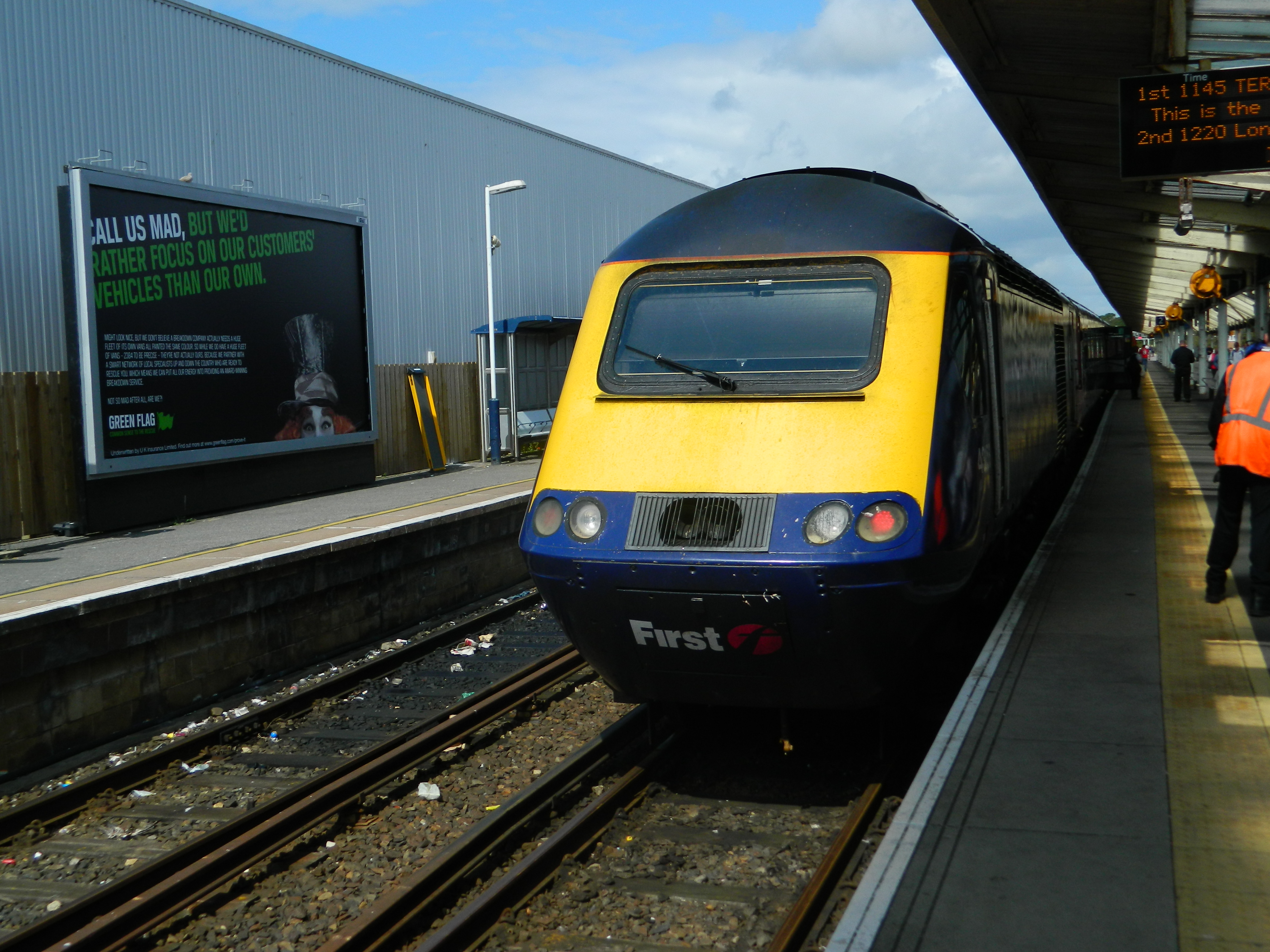
- A First Great Western InterCity 125 at Weymouth

Overview
- Service type: Passenger train
- First service: 2014
- Last service: 2017
- Former operator: Great Western Railway

Route
- Termini: Bristol Temple Meads; Weymouth
- Stops: 14
- Distance travelled: 87¼ miles
- Service frequency: Summer Saturdays (May – September)
- Train numbers: 1O72 (to Weymouth); 1V72 (to Bristol)

The Weymouth Wizard was a named summer service operated by Great Western Railway (GWR) via the Heart of Wessex Line between Bristol Temple Meads and Weymouth. The special service was named when GWR started running a single Saturday summer InterCity 125 service between Bristol Temple Meads and Weymouth.

== Historic service ==
The use of the Weymouth Wizard name was actually a revival of a title used by the Western Region of British Railways between 1981 and 1985 on a locomotive-hauled high summer midweek special. This generally ran on Tuesdays-Thursdays from Swindon to Weymouth via Melksham, Westbury and Yeovil Pen Mill. A special, large, commemorative headboard was often carried by the locomotive heading the train, this had been produced by Swindon Works carriage shop and was designed by works sign-writer / illustrator Ernie Hewlett. At the time the Chippenham-Trowbridge stretch of line was under threat of closure and the success of this train went some way to laying the foundations for the route to re-open under the terms of the 'Speller Act' with a limited, experimental passenger service commencing in May 1985. With this came the re-opening of Melksham station.

== 21st century ==
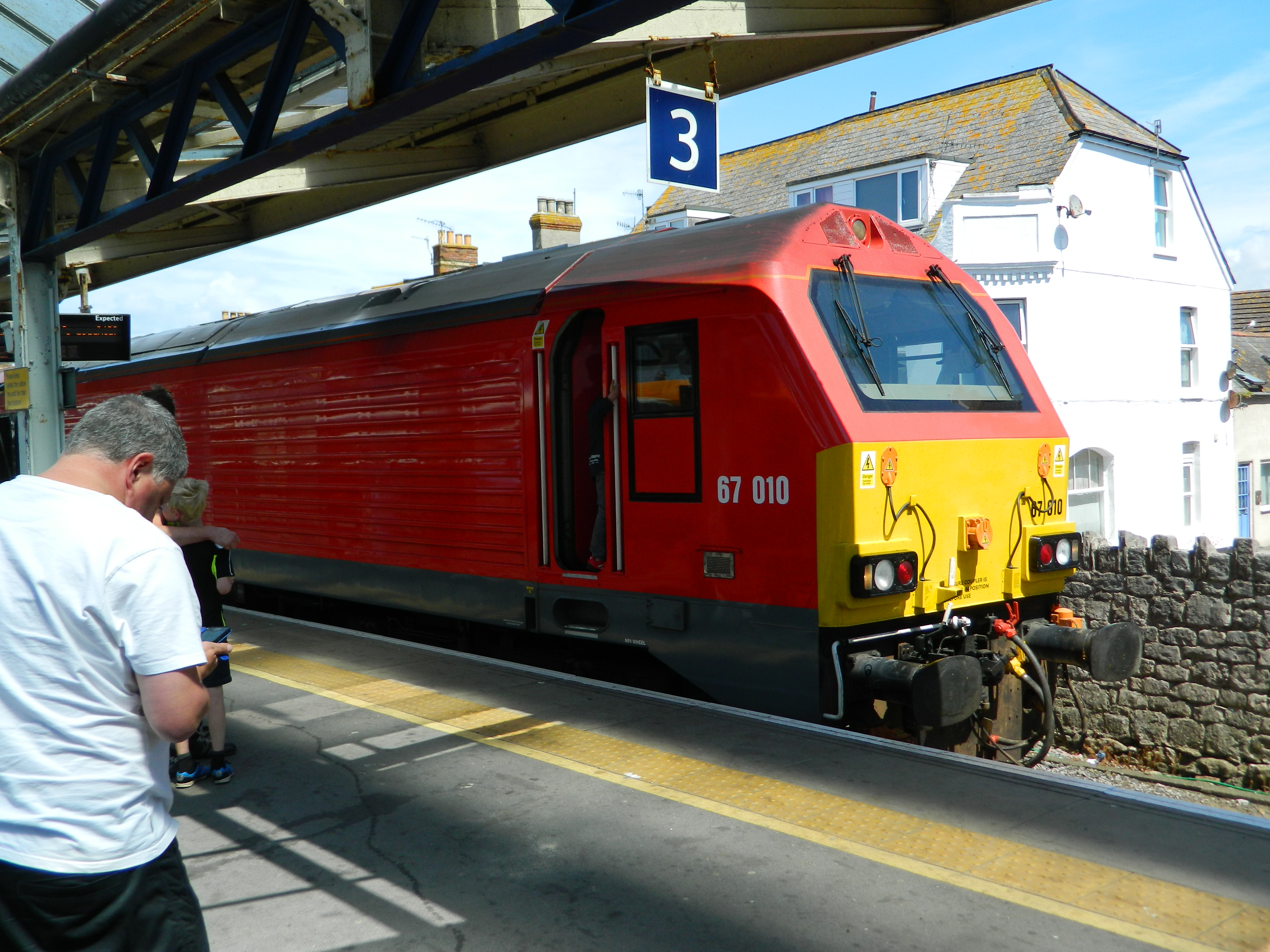
A Class 67 locomotive at Weymouth, having hauled a rake of Mark 2 carriages on the Weymouth Wizard service from Bristol Temple Meads.

For the later HST service GWR collaborated with the Heart of Wessex Line to promote rail travel along the popular route. The InterCity 125 service began in 2014 and returned each year until 2017. The service was DMU worked from the May 2018 timetable change, with neither an InterCity 125 nor the name Weymouth Wizard being used by GWR for their extra Summer Saturday Bristol to Weymouth service any longer. Previously First Great Western operated a summer Saturday service on the route with hired in Class 67s and Mark 2 carriages. This occurred on just one further occasion under the new franchise, as on 3 June 2017 Great Western Railway required the regular InterCity 125 set to run a football special to Cardiff Central, and were forced to hire a locomotive (67010) and a full set of 11 Mark 2 carriages from DB Cargo.

The HST left Bristol Temple Meads at 09:06 and arrived in Weymouth at 11:45. The train then waited in the Weymouth sidings until its return journey at 17:28, arriving back in Bristol at 20:09. Its presence in the siding led to some complaints from adjacent residents, as the engines were initially left running in the absence of any 'shore' power supply. Due to engineering works in August 2015 between Westbury and Bath Spa via Bradford-on-Avon, the service was diverted via Swindon, meaning passengers did not have to use a replacement bus service.

The calling pattern of the Weymouth Wizard service was as-follows;

- Bristol Temple Meads
- Swindon (August 2015 only)
- Chippenham (August 2015 only)
- Melksham (August 2015 only)
- Keynsham (Not August 2015)
- Oldfield Park (Not August 2015)
- Bath Spa (Not August 2015)
- Bradford-on-Avon (Not August 2015)
- Trowbridge
- Westbury
- Frome
- Bruton (Evening return service only)
- Castle Cary
- Yeovil Pen Mill
- Maiden Newton
- Dorchester West
- Weymouth

Since May 2018 the additional services have continued to run in the Summer only, but using Class 166 rolling stock that serves the line at other times.
