= Berks and Hants Railway =

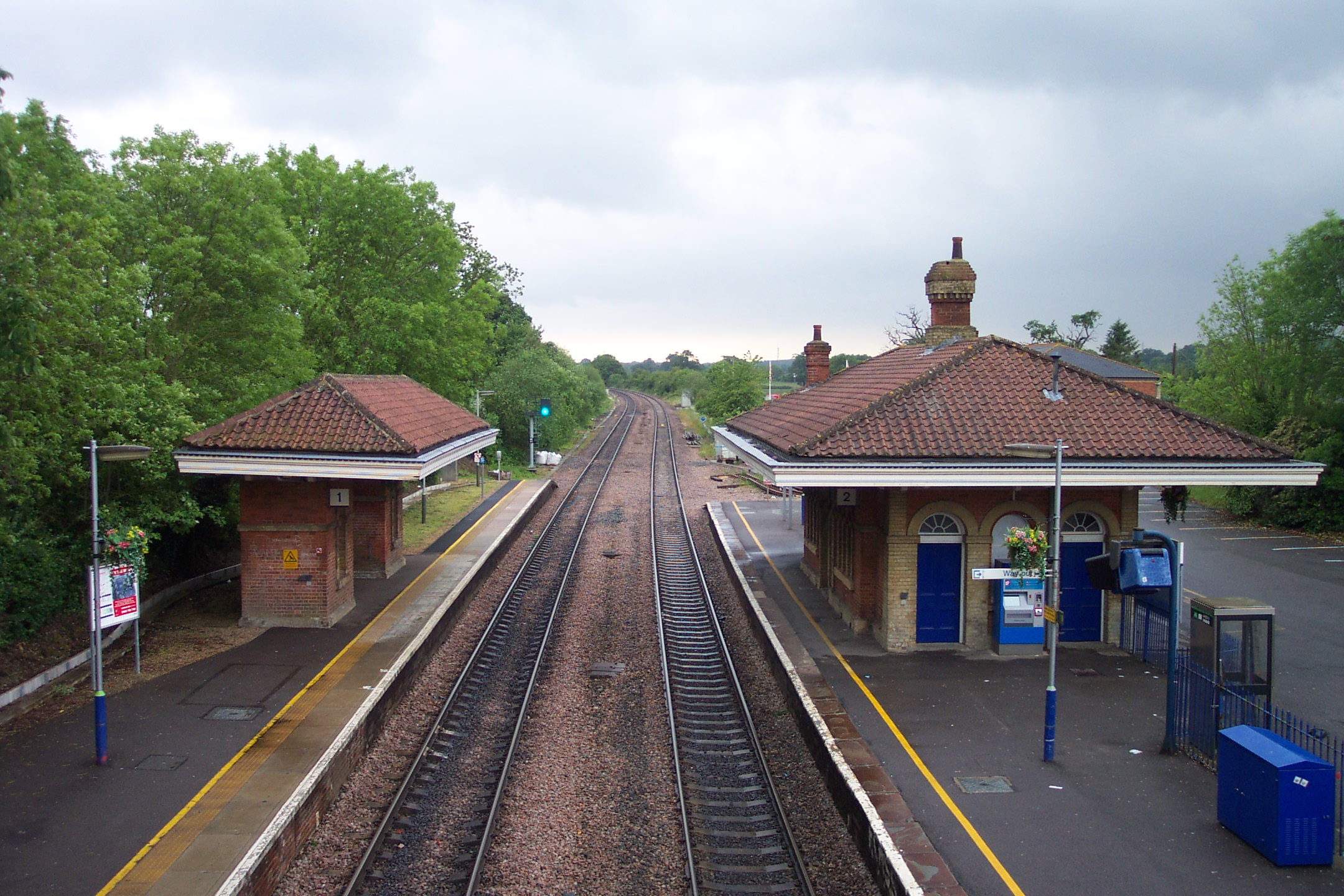
Mortimer railway station on the Basingstoke branch

The Berks and Hants Railway comprised two railway lines built simultaneously by the Great Western Railway (GWR) south and west from Reading in an attempt to keep the London and South Western Railway (LSWR) out of the area that it considered to be its territory in England.

One line ran from Reading to Hungerford and was entirely in the county of Berkshire ("Berks"). A later Berks and Hants Extension Railway continued the Hungerford line to Devizes in Wiltshire. Since 1906 part of this route has formed the direct Reading to Taunton Line used by trains to Devon and Cornwall. The term 'Berks and Hants Line' has been used intermittently by officials and passengers for the whole route from Reading to Taunton even though it does not enter Hampshire and most was never built by the Berks and Hants Railway.

The second line ran from Reading to Basingstoke and terminated adjacent to the LSWR station there. Later the GWR station was closed and trains on the Reading to Basingstoke Line now use a platform of the rebuilt LSWR station.

== History ==
Berks and Hants Railway Act 1845
- Act of Parliament
- Parliament of the United Kingdom
- Long title: An Act for making a Railway from the Great Western Railway at or near Reading to the Towns of Newbury and Hungerford, and also to join the South-western Railway at or near Basingstoke.
- Citation: 8 & 9 Vict. c. xl

Dates
- Royal assent: 30 June 1845

In 1844, the GWR proposed a 7 ft 1/4 in (2,140 mm) broad gauge branch line from Pangbourne railway station to Newbury while the LSWR was promoting an alternative 4 ft 8 1/2 in (1,435 mm) standard gauge branch from Basingstoke to Newbury and Swindon, the heart of GWR territory. However, the following year saw an act of Parliament, the Berks and Hants Railway Act 1845 (8 & 9 Vict. c. xl), passed to allow the construction of the GWR-backed Berks and Hants Railway from Reading to both Basingstoke and Hungerford. The capital for this company was put forward in the names of GWR directors, and the following year a new act of Parliament, the Great Western Railway Act 1846 (9 & 10 Vict. c. xiv), saw the Berks and Hants formally absorbed into the larger company.

The first section to open was that to Hungerford on 21 December 1847. The line to Basingstoke left the Hungerford line at Southcote Junction on the outskirts of Reading, and was opened nearly a year later on 1 November 1848.

Berks and Hants Extension Railway Act 1859
- Act of Parliament
- Parliament of the United Kingdom
- Long title: An Act to authorize the Construction of a Railway from Hungerford in Berkshire to Devizes in Wiltshire, to be called "The Berks and Hants Extension Railway."
- Citation: 22 & 23 Vict. c. cv

Dates
- Royal assent: 13 August 1859

The Berks and Hants Extension Railway was authorised by the Berks and Hants Extension Railway Act 1859 (22 & 23 Vict. c. cv) and opened from Hungerford to Devizes on 11 November 1862. This was part of a GWR scheme to provide a more direct line from London to Exeter in Devon, however other elements of the route failed to materialise and the direct route to Exeter was built by the LSWR from Basingstoke through Salisbury.

A third rail was laid along the Basingstoke branch on 22 December 1856. This mixed gauge was to allow standard gauge goods trains to run through from the Midlands to ports on the south coast. Broad gauge trains stopped running on this route from 1 April 1869.

On 27 June 1874, a special road coach service was instigated between Hungerford and Devizes while the engineers converted the single track on this section to standard gauge. The remainder of the line from Hungerford to Southcote Junction at Reading was worked as a single line with trains in both directions using the normal eastbound line with a passing place kept at Newbury while the westbound line was converted. The last broad gauge train ran on 30 June and the following day the trains started to use the new standard gauge westbound line and ran through to Devizes again. Conversion of the eastbound line could then take place, and a normal service resumed on 4 July.

At Devizes the Extension Railway connected with a branch line from Holt Junction on the Wilts, Somerset and Weymouth line which allowed through trains over the Berks and Hants to Bristol Temple Meads. The Stert and Westbury Railway was opened on 29 July 1900 (1 October 1900 for passengers) from a new station called Patney and Chirton to Westbury which allowed a shorter journey via Hungerford to Weymouth from where passengers could sail to the Channel Islands. From 2 July 1906 through passenger trains on the Reading to Taunton line started running over the Berks and Hants line following the completion of a new cut-off line from Castle Cary railway station to Cogload Junction near Taunton.

== Relics ==
Most of the original Berks and Hants stations have been rebuilt; however, there are two early survivors.

- Mortimer railway station on the Basingstoke line is a good example of Isambard Kingdom Brunel's "chalet" style station; the main building has eaves on all sides to give shelter to passengers and there is a small waiting shelter on the opposite platform in matching style.
- Pewsey railway station on the Extension has a main building that shows the decorative brickwork that was a feature of the line's stations; the waiting room on the opposite platform is a modern reproduction. Original station name boards from Manningford Halt and Wootton Rivers Halt are at Pewsey Heritage Centre alongside other railway exhibits.
