= Holt Junction railway station =

Former railway station in Wiltshire, England

Holt Junction
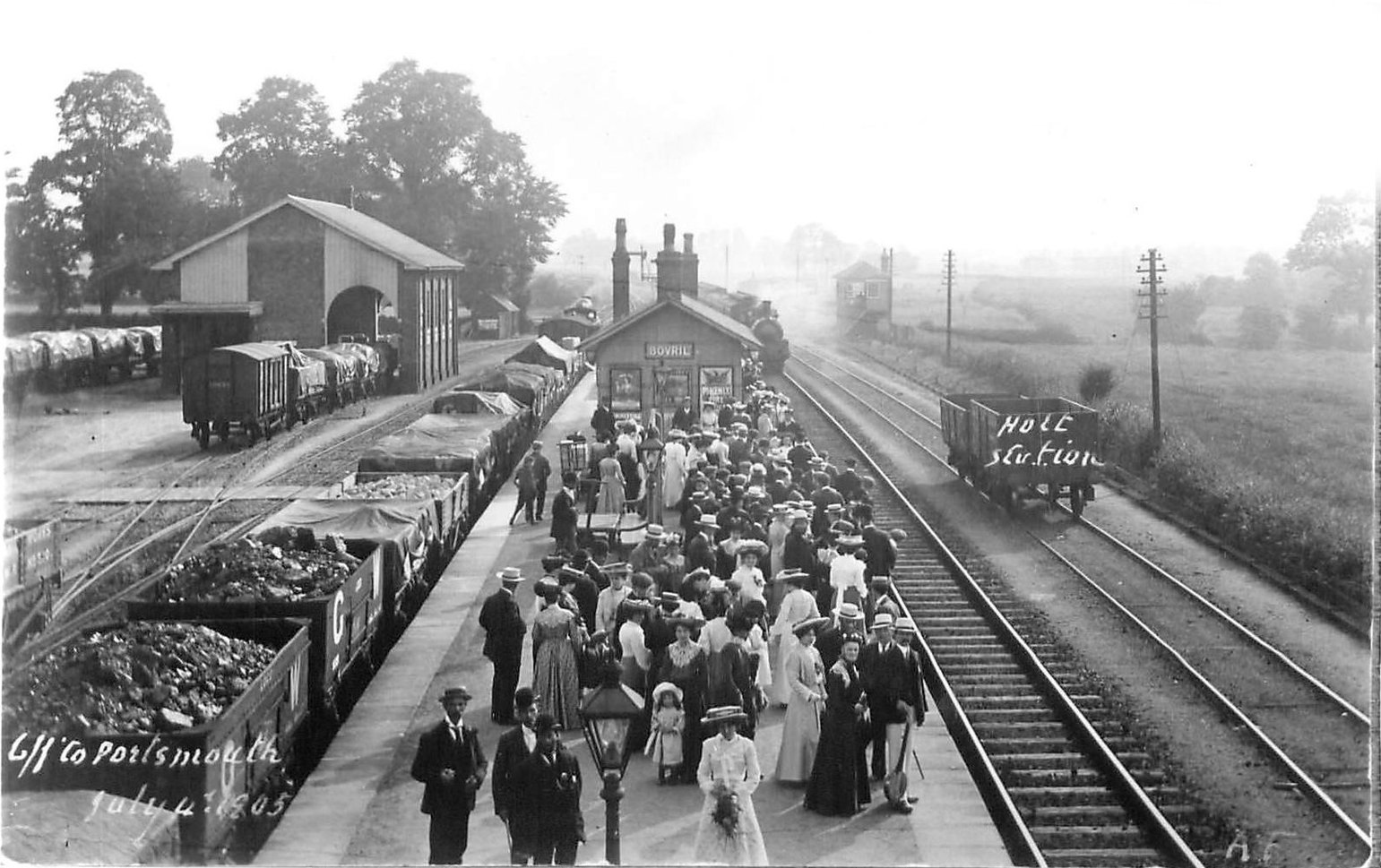
- Holt Junction station in 1905

General information
- Location: Holt, Wiltshire; England
- Coordinates: 51.3536°N 2.1862°W
- Grid reference: ST871616
- Platforms: 2

Other information
- Status: Disused

History
- Original company: Great Western Railway
- Pre-grouping: Great Western Railway
- Post-grouping: Great Western Railway

Key dates
- 1857: Junction established.
- 1861: Station opened.
- 1874: Station rebuilt and connected to the village.
- 1877: Goods shed opened.
- 1953: Goods shed demolished.
- 1963: Goods yard closed.
- 1966: Station closed. Devizes line closed.
- 1967: Signal box closed, main line singled.
- 1981: Remainder of Devizes line lifted.
Location

Holt Junction was a railway station which served the village of Holt, Wiltshire, England between 1861 and 1966. It stood on the Wessex Main Line at its junction with the western end of the Devizes branch.

== History ==
In 1848, the Wilts, Somerset and Weymouth Railway Company opened their line southward from Thingley Junction near Chippenham, at first only as far as Westbury. The line passed Holt village to the southeast but there were no local stations. In 1850, the line was sold to the Great Western Railway (GWR) who completed the Devizes branch line in 1857; this met the Chippenham-Westbury line to the east of the village. Although most sources give a slightly later date of 1861, recent research has found that a single interchange island platform was reported at the junction from 1857: this allowed passengers to transfer between main and branch line trains.

In 1862, the GWR extended its Reading-Hungerford line westward via Pewsey to Devizes, creating a through route from the South West to London Paddington. By 1866, seven passenger trains each weekday called at Holt; six in the London direction.

The station was reconfigured and connected to the village by a footpath in 1874; in 1877 a road connection was made and a goods shed was built. In 1895, the station gained a footbridge and a platform building.

In 1897, the Anglo-Swiss Condensed Milk Company (later Nestlé) converted Staverton Mill, about one mile from the station, for condensed milk production. In 1909, a large covered loading bay for milk was built to the west of the station; this remained in use until the factory gained a direct rail connection in 1934.

From 1905 the GWR used rail motors (self-propelled carriages) to provide local services on the Chippenham-Westbury line and the Devizes branch.

== Decline and closure ==
Usage of the Devizes line declined from 1900 after the opening of the shorter Stert-Westbury link, which effectively bypassed the longer single line through Devizes to Holt.

The Beeching Axe was the death knell for the junction. The Devizes Branch was recommended for closure, as were the stations between Chippenham and Trowbridge. The goods yard closed in October 1963; the goods shed having been largely demolished in 1953. The station and branch line closed in April 1966. The 48-lever signal box followed in February 1967, and the Thingley to Bradford Junction route was singled.

While most of the Devizes branch was lifted shortly after closure, a spur from Holt station was retained as a long siding until 1981, when it too was lifted. This was used for the storage of empty wagons, and as a stabling point for the Royal Train.

== The site today ==
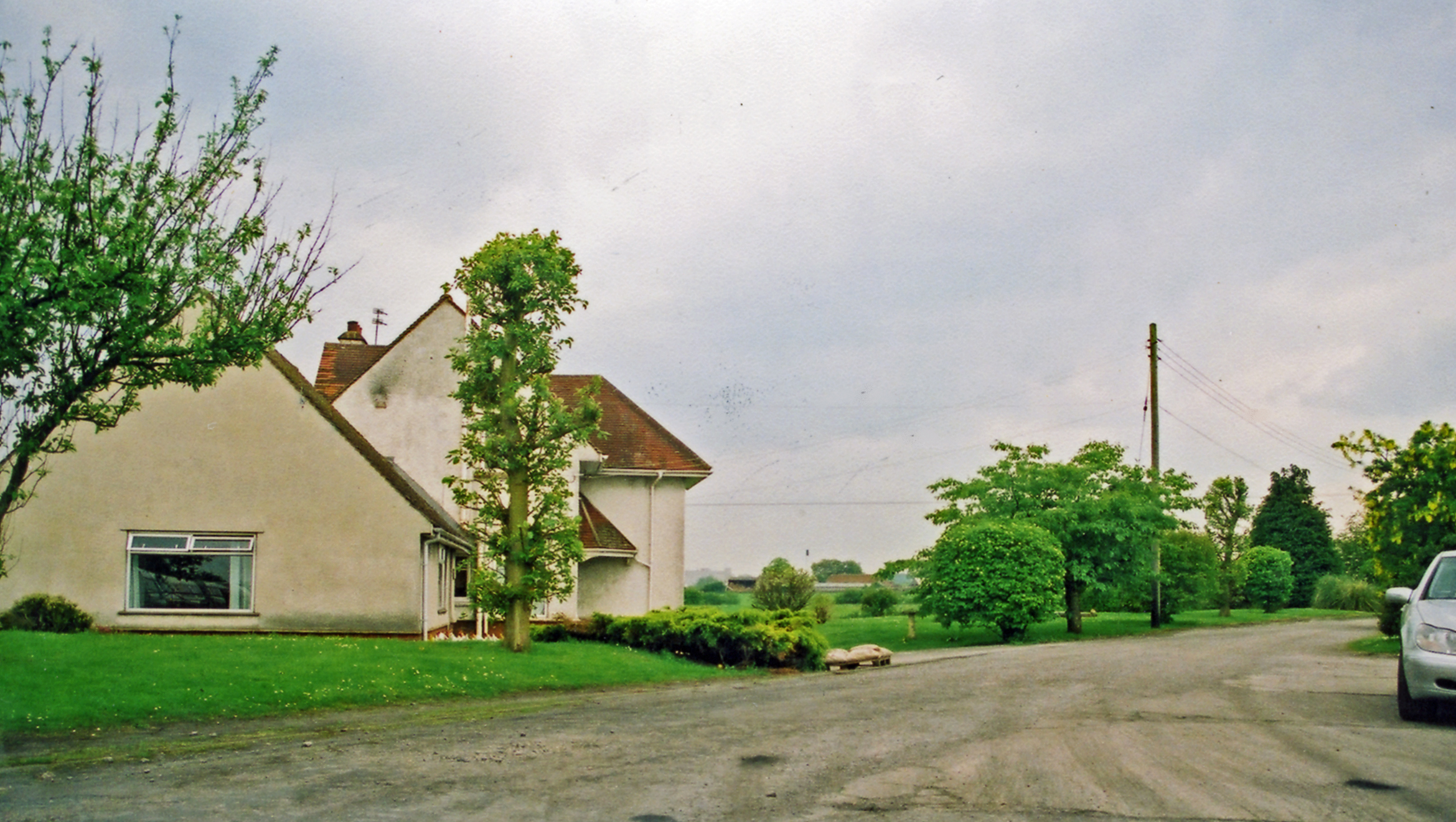
The old station master's house at Holt Junction

The station master's house remains, but all remaining buildings on the old station site were demolished in 1970. The site was used as a builders merchants' depot before becoming a light industrial estate. Some of the site is also used as a caravan storage facility.

The site retains road access to the remaining railway line, for engineering purposes. Freight services, particularly heavy aggregate trains from limestone quarries in the Mendips, continue to use the line through the closed station.

Between 1966 and 1985, passenger usage of the line was limited to the occasional diversion or summer excursion (such as the Weymouth Wizard). The reopening of Melksham station in 1985 saw the resumption of regular passenger services between Swindon and Westbury on the Thingley-Bradford Junction route. The line is also one of the routes used by the Night Riviera sleeper service from London to Penzance.

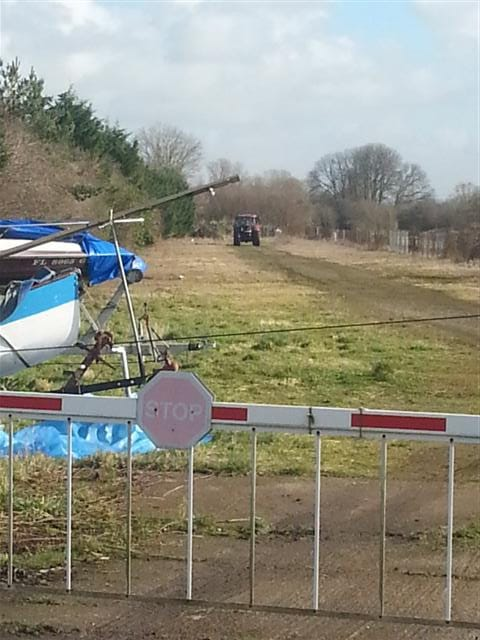
The site of the sidings in 2013

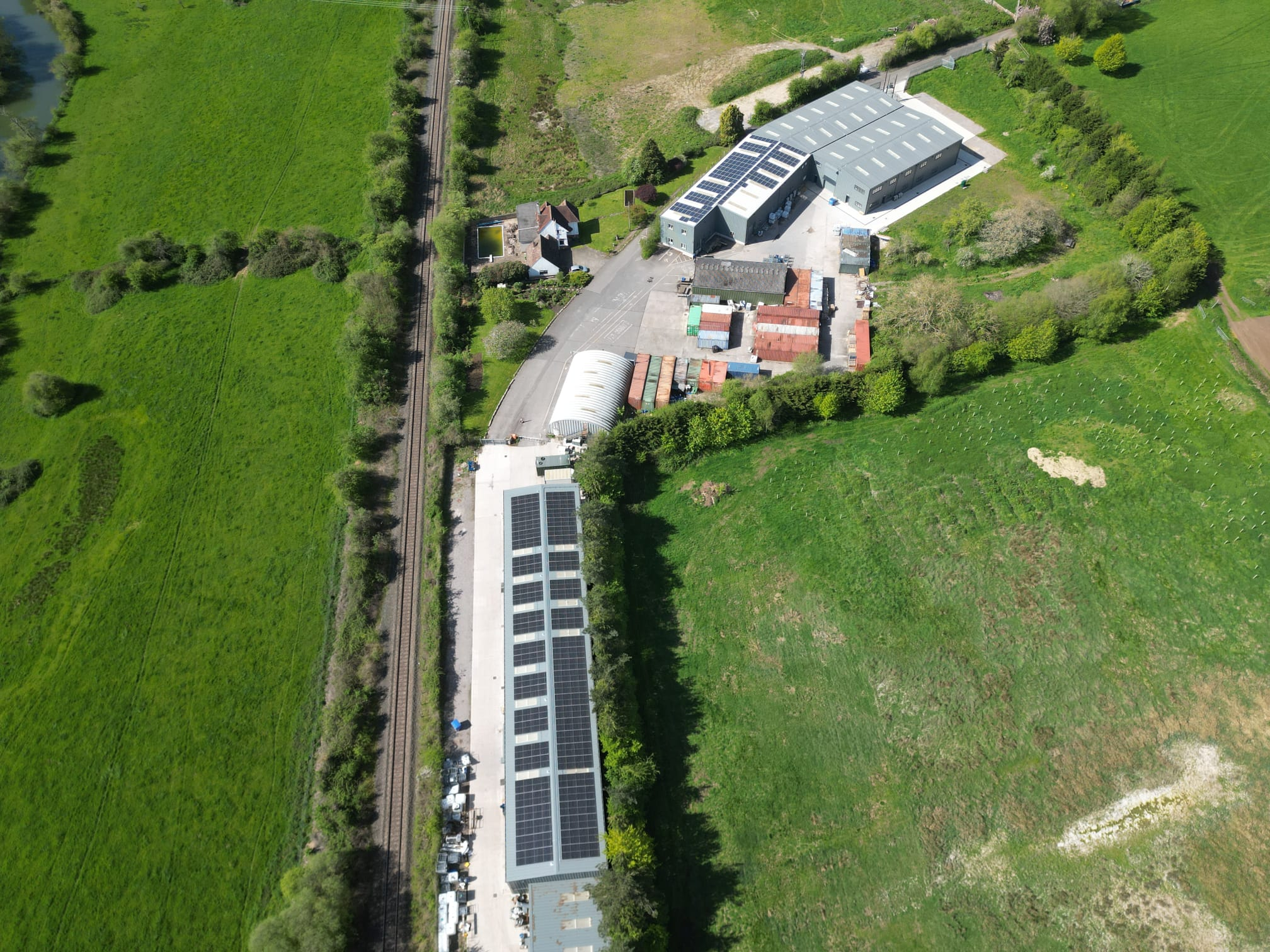
The site from the air: new buildings added in 2014, then more in 2025 and 2026

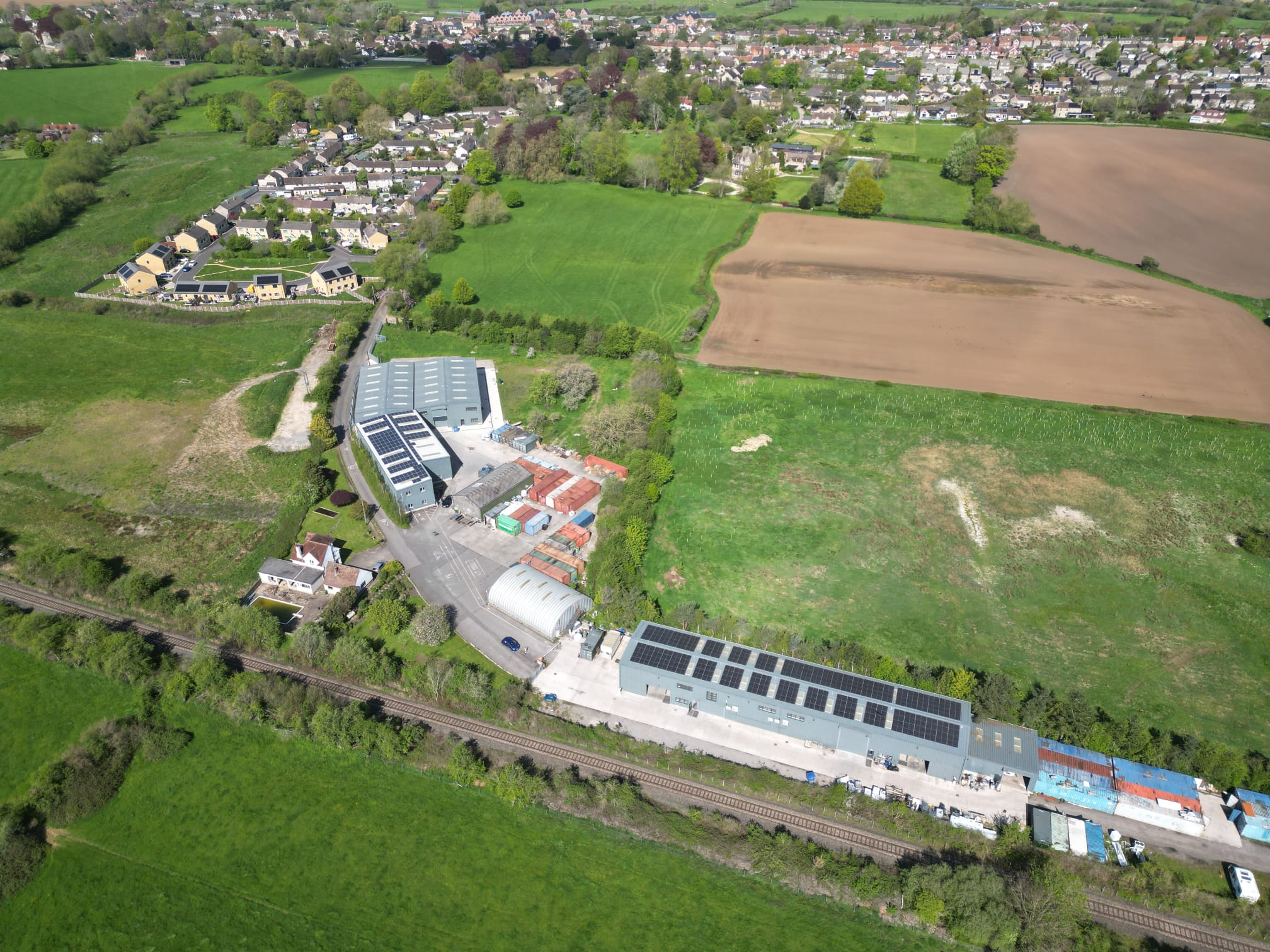

Preceding station	Historical railways	Following station
Broughton Gifford Halt; Line open, station closed	Great Western Railway; Wessex Main Line	Staverton Halt; Line open, station closed
Semington Halt; Line and station closed	Great Western Railway; Devizes Branch Line	Staverton Halt; Line open, station closed
