= Devizes branch line =

The Devizes branch line was a railway line from Holt Junction (south-west of Melksham) to Patney and Chirton (south-east of Devizes), in Wiltshire, England. It was named after Devizes, the largest town on the line. The branch was opened by the Great Western Railway in 1857, and from 1862 when the Reading-Hungerford line reached Devizes it became part of the shortest route from London to the West Country. Those services were re-routed in 1900, and the line closed in 1966.

== History ==
The idea of a railway line through Devizes was first conceived in 1830, before the Great Western Railway (GWR) had begun to construct its main lines. Devizes was regularly considered by the GWR as a major stop on its London to Bristol Line but lost out to Swindon due to lack of potential traffic from Devizes.

A branch to Devizes was included in plans for the Wilts, Somerset and Weymouth Railway, authorised by Parliament in 1845; however, that company could only afford to build part of its main line, from Thingley Junction near Chippenham to Westbury, before it was taken over in 1850 by the Great Western Railway.

Potential construction costs were high because Devizes stands on a hill, so the town was left without a station. In 1854 the GWR finally began to build from near Holt Junction on the former WS&WR line eastward to Devizes, completing the branch in 1857.

In 1862, the GWR extended its Reading-Hungerford line westward via Pewsey to Devizes, creating a direct link from London Paddington to Bristol which was shorter than any other route. This was the busiest period for the Devizes line, but traffic declined from 1900 after the Stert-Westbury link was built to reduce journey time by avoiding the steep inclines into Devizes.

== Closure ==
The line and all its stations closed in 1966 under British Rail's Beeching cuts. The closure of the line can be accounted for by the awkward geography of the Devizes line, and the declining amounts of traffic due to alternative railway lines and the increasing popularity of road transport.

Apart from a few remaining bridges and the tunnel under the grounds of Devizes Castle, there is little evidence of the railway on the landscape, and all stations and halts were demolished in 1970.

== See also ==
- Devizes railway station
