= Berryfield =

Village in Wiltshire, England

Coordinates: 51.360°N 2.147°W

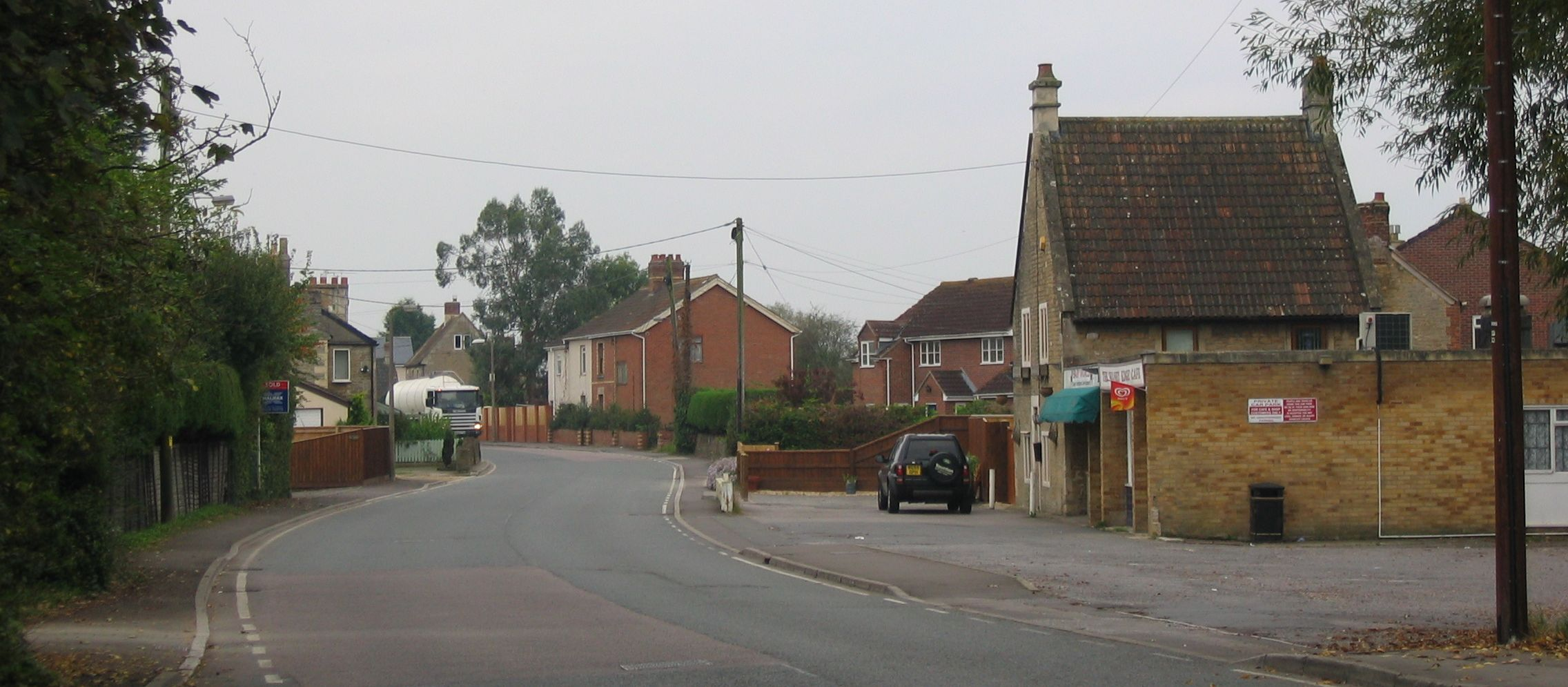
- Semington Road

- Location within Wiltshire
- OS grid reference: ST899623
- Civil parish: Melksham Without
- Unitary authority: Wiltshire
- Ceremonial county: Wiltshire
- Region: South West
- Country: England
- Sovereign state: United Kingdom
- Post town: Melksham
- Postcode district: SN12
- Dialling code: 01225
- Police: Wiltshire
- Fire: Dorset and Wiltshire
- Ambulance: South Western
- UK Parliament: Melksham and Devizes

Berryfield is a small village to the south of the town of Melksham, in Wiltshire, England. The village is separated from the southwestern outskirts of Melksham by the A350 road and about 500 metres of farmland; it falls within the civil parish of Melksham Without. The Bristol Avon is about 0.6 miles (1 km) west of the village. Although close to Melksham town, Berryfield remains a separate community.

The place name came into use in the second half of the 20th century. Volume 7 of A History of the County of Wiltshire (Victoria County History, 1953) has "the district is known as Berryfields" (sic) and an Ordnance Survey map published in 1958 labels only Berryfield Cottages, at the west end of the present village. Development began in World War II when houses were built as accommodation for an RAF training school at Bowerhill, about 0.6 miles (1 km) to the east. This development was accessed from the A350 road towards Semington and Trowbridge; in 2004 Berryfield was bypassed by a new section of the A350, taking through traffic away from the village.

The Wilts & Berks Canal, opened in 1810 and abandoned in 1914, passed east of Berryfield on its way from its junction with the Kennet and Avon Canal to the east side of Melksham. The Wilts & Berks is under restoration but its original route in this area is no longer available, so in 2012 a planning application was submitted for a new section of canal (called the Melksham Link) which will pass through Berryfield.

About one thousand people live in Berryfield. Amenities include a pub called The New Inn on the former A350, and a children's playground.
