= Melksham Without =

Civil parish in Wiltshire, England

Coordinates: 51.38°N 2.11°W

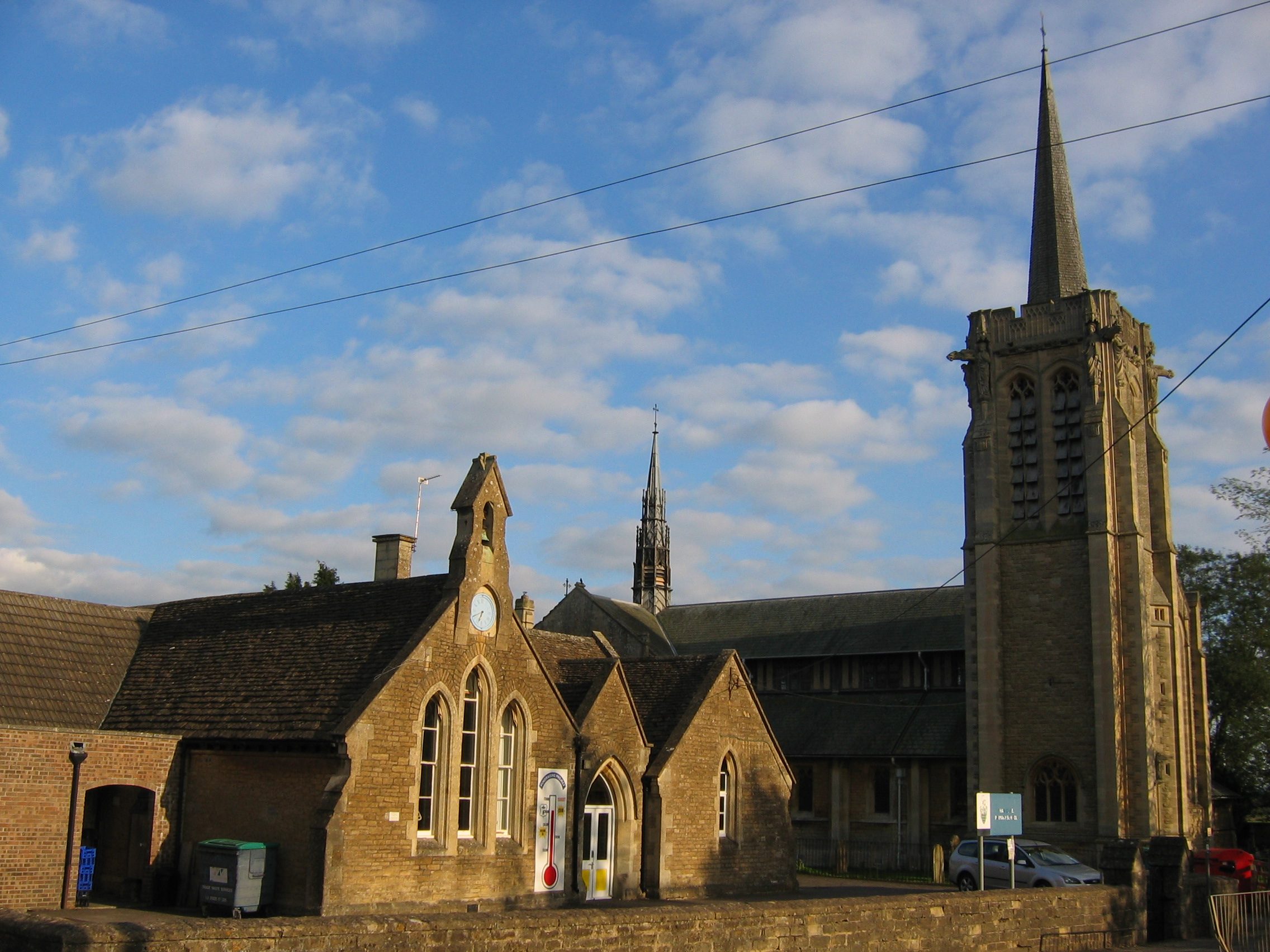
- Church and primary school at Shaw

- Location within Wiltshire
- Population: 7,230 (in 2011)
- OS grid reference: ST9265
- Civil parish: Melksham Without
- Unitary authority: Wiltshire
- Ceremonial county: Wiltshire
- Region: South West
- Country: England
- Sovereign state: United Kingdom
- Post town: Melksham
- Postcode district: SN12
- Dialling code: 01225
- Police: Wiltshire
- Fire: Dorset and Wiltshire
- Ambulance: South Western
- UK Parliament: Melksham and Devizes
- Website: www.melkshamwithout-pc.gov.uk

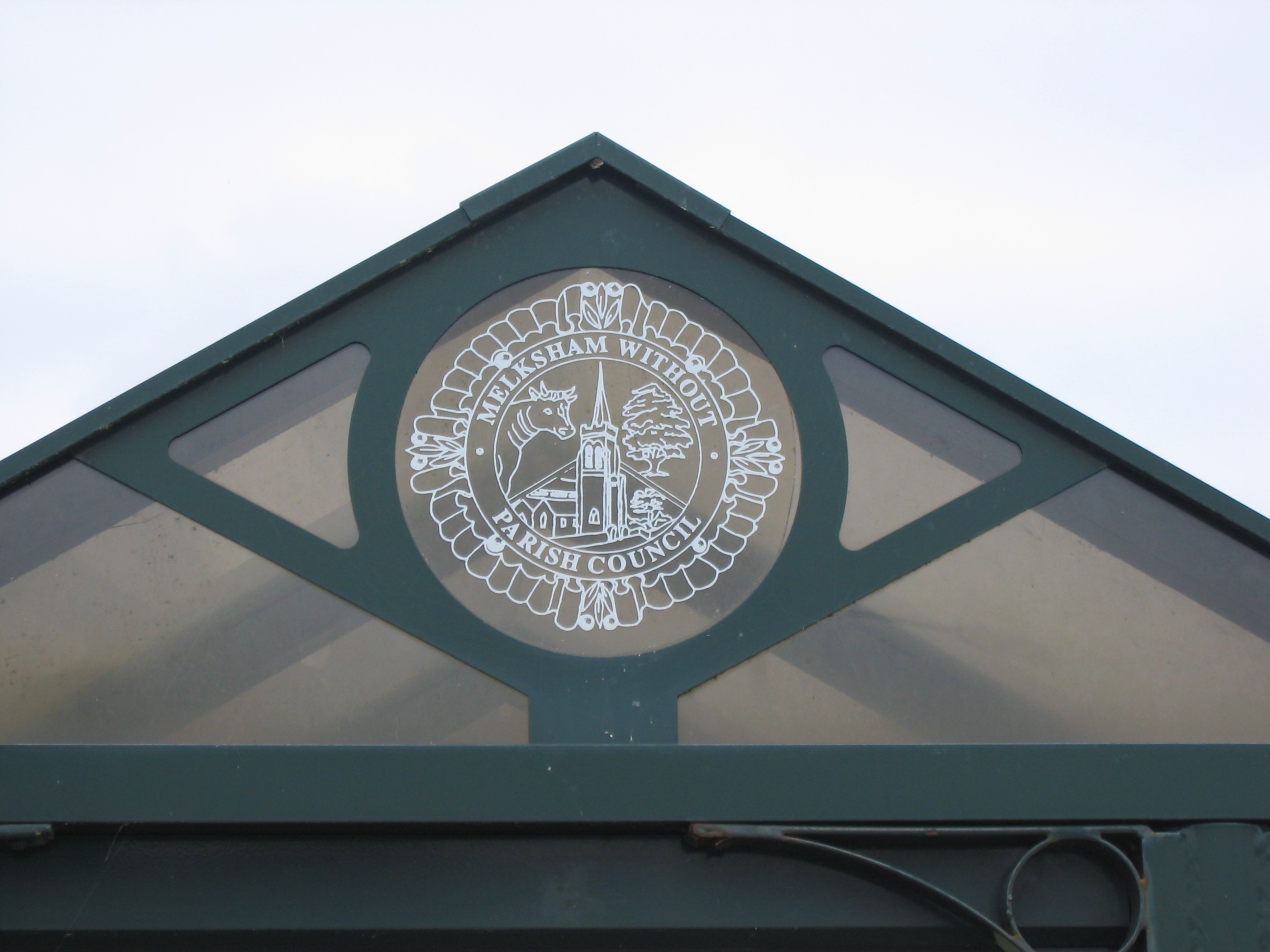
Melksham Without parish council logo on a bus stop near Berryfield

Melksham Without is a civil parish in the county of Wiltshire, England. It surrounds, but does not include, the town of Melksham and is the largest rural parish in Wiltshire, with a population of 7,230 (as of 2011) and an area of 29 square kilometres (7,200 acres). The parish includes the villages of Beanacre, Berryfield, Shaw and Whitley, and the hamlets of Outmarsh and Redstocks. It also includes the outer Melksham suburbs of Bowerhill and The Spa, and the dispersed settlement of Sandridge which includes Sandridge Common.

The northern boundary of the parish is the Roman road from Silchester to Bath; downstream from Melksham the Bristol Avon forms the southwestern boundary, and parts of the southern boundary are the Semington Brook and the Kennet and Avon Canal.

== History ==
The Local Government Act 1894 created the parish of Melksham Without, dividing the ancient parish of Melksham into an urban area (Melksham Within) and a rural area (Melksham Without). The latter consists of the ancient settlements of Beanacre, Shaw and Whitley, surrounding Melksham Within on all sides except the west. Until the 17th century, the area to the east was royal forest, and this part is lightly populated and agricultural. To the south the land was similarly rural but was used for military purposes in the mid-20th century, with the training schools of RAF Melksham based at Bowerhill, and this area now consists of light industry and housing estates. There is another housing estate separate from the town at Berryfield, to the south.

== Governance ==
The civil parish elects a parish council. It is in the area of Wiltshire Council unitary authority, which performs most local government functions. Unusually, the parish shares some land in common with the parish of Broughton Gifford, namely farmland to the north of Holbrook Farm, bounded to the west by the Avon.

The parish spans three electoral divisions. The north of the parish is part of Melksham Without North and Shurnold division, while the east and south are part of Bowerhill division; both divisions also extend to parts of Melksham town. In the south-west, Berryfield is part of the Melksham Without West and Rural division. Each division elects one member of Wiltshire Council.

For Westminster elections, the parish is part of the Melksham and Devizes constituency.

== Notable buildings ==
The parish has one Grade I listed building: Beanacre Old Manor, west of what is now the A350, has a timber-framed hall from the late 14th century, with many additions and alterations in later centuries. Close by to the south-west is Beanacre Manor, from c.1595 with a 17th-century dairy, Grade II* listed.

Two further buildings are listed Grade II*: Woolmore Manor, built in 1631 and now on the south-east edge of Melksham, near modern Bowerhill; and Christ Church, Shaw, designed in 1905 in Arts and Crafts Gothic style by C.E. Ponting.

== Transport ==
A packhorse bridge dating from 1725 spans the River Avon, providing a route (now a public footpath) to Broughton Gifford.

The Kennet and Avon Canal was built in the south of the parish by 1804 and fully opened in 1810. In the same year the Wilts & Berks Canal opened, having been built through the parish from its connection with the K&A near Semington. After passing through the eastern side of Melksham town the canal continued north through the parish towards Chippenham, Swindon and Abingdon. Both canals fell into decline following the arrival of the railways in the 1840s, and the closure of the Somerset Coal Canal (which provided much of their traffic) in 1904.

In 1848 the Wilts, Somerset and Weymouth Railway company built their line through the parish, to link the Swindon-Bath line (near Chippenham) with Westbury via Melksham and Trowbridge; the line was handed over to the Great Western Railway in 1850 and is still in use. From 1905 to 1955 there was a small station, Beanacre Halt, near Beanacre on the road towards Whitley. The Devizes Branch Line was completed in 1857 and also taken over by the GWR, but closed in 1966. It connected with the main line near Holt and passed near Outmarsh, where there was a station, Semington Halt.

Today the Kennet and Avon Canal is a well-used recreational waterway, following its restoration in the 1970s and 1980s and formal re-opening in 1990. The Wilts & Berks Canal was abandoned in 1914 and its route south and east of Melksham has been built over; preservation and restoration efforts began in 1977 and in 2012 a planning application was submitted for a new section of canal (called the Melksham Link) to connect the Semington junction, via Berryfield, with the Avon below Melksham.

The A350 primary route runs north–south through the parish on its section from Chippenham to Melksham and passes through Beanacre. South of Melksham, on its way to Westbury, its original route past Berryfield and Outmarsh was replaced in 2004 by the Semington bypass, about 400m to the east. The new route required the construction of an aqueduct to carry the Kennet and Avon Canal, the New Semington Aqueduct. The Hampton Park West industrial area, between the old and new routes, has the headquarters of Avon Rubber and G Plan Upholstery, and a divisional headquarters of Wiltshire Police.
