= Wiltshire and Bath Air Ambulance Charity =

English charity air ambulance

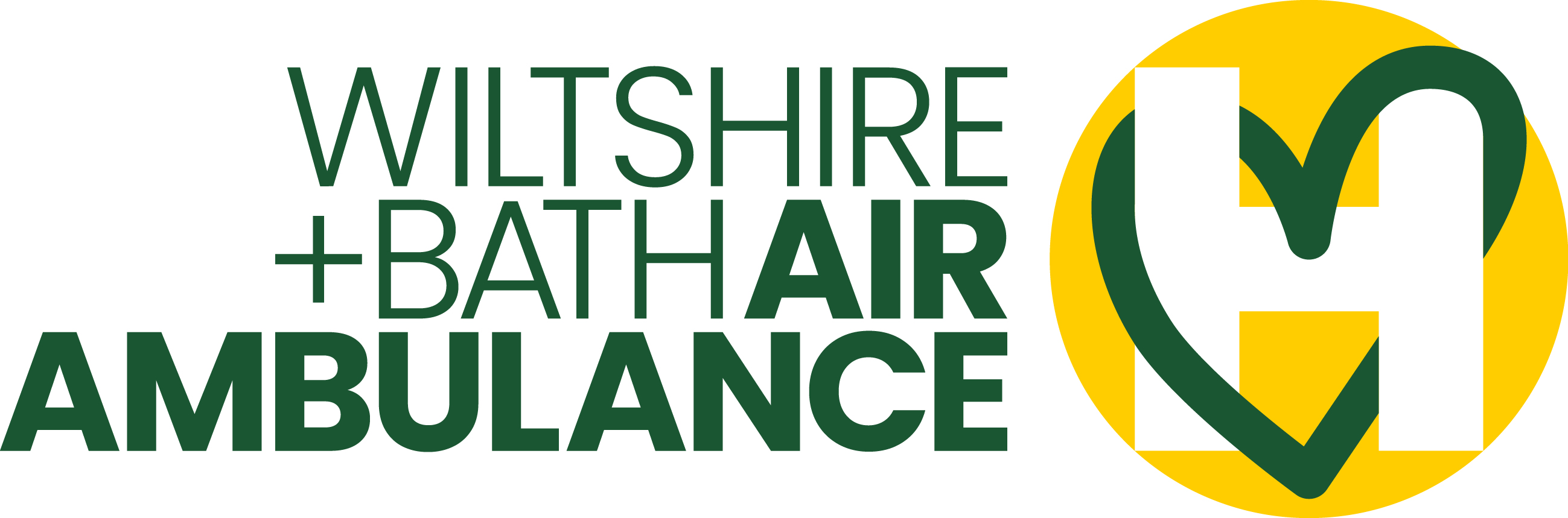

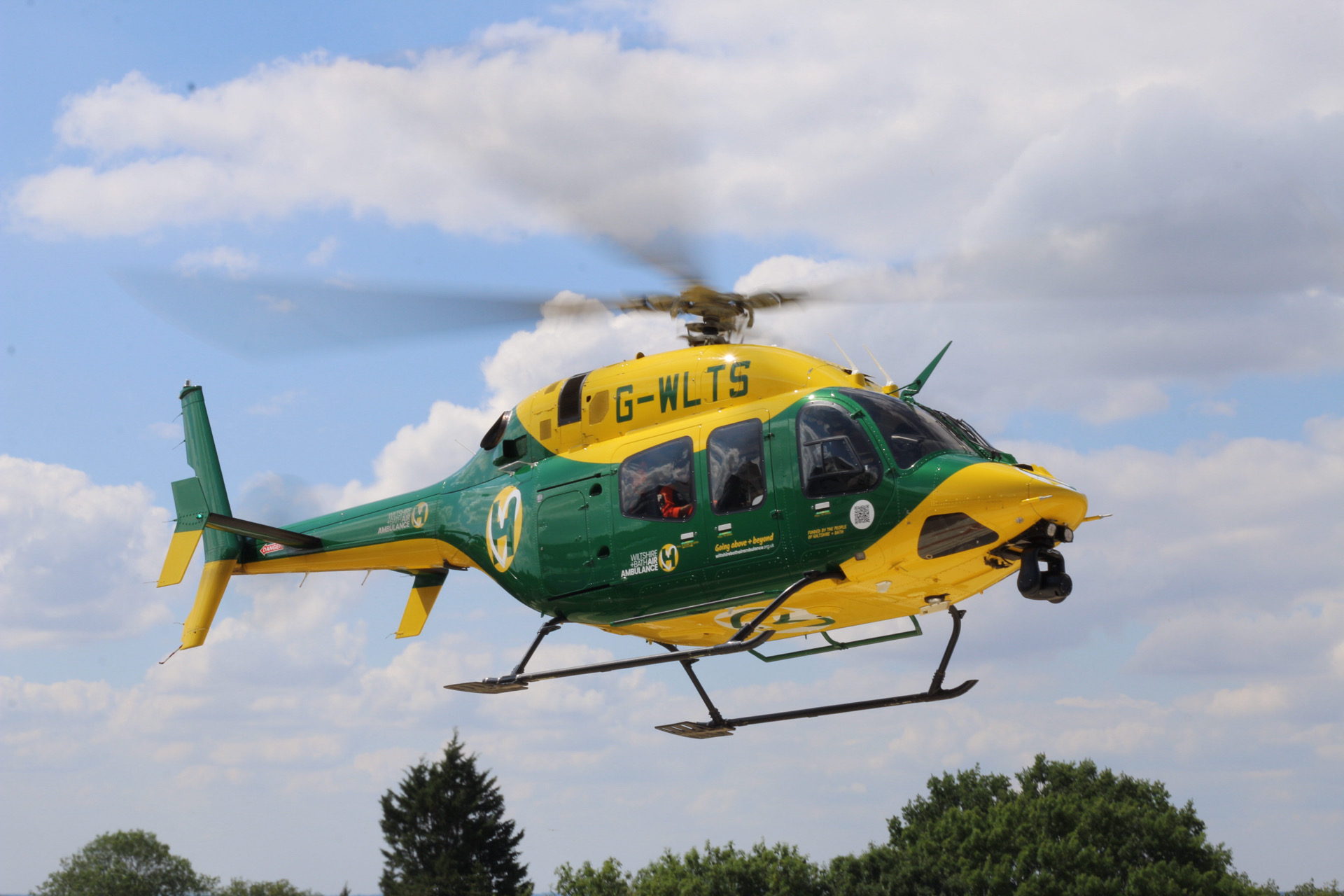
- Bell 429 helicopter of Wiltshire and Bath Air Ambulance
- Legal status: Registered charity
- Purpose: To provide vital critical medical care by land and air, across Wiltshire and Bath.
- Location: Outmarsh, near Semington
- Coordinates: 51.3517°N 2.1414°W
- Region served: Wiltshire, Bath and surrounding areas
- Patron: Queen Camilla
- Revenue: £5.3 million (2024)
- Employees: 37 (2024)
- Volunteers: 120 (2024)
- Website: www.wiltshirebathairambulance.org.uk

Wiltshire and Bath Air Ambulance Charity is a helicopter emergency medical service (HEMS) serving Wiltshire, Bath and surrounding areas of England. The service was launched in 1990, and since 2015 has been run as a registered charity.

== History ==
The service was formed on 15 March 1990, as a joint venture between Wiltshire Ambulance Service NHS Trust and Wiltshire Police using a joint helicopter, based at police headquarters in Devizes.

The Wiltshire Air Ambulance Appeal, a registered charity, was set up to raise funds for Wiltshire Air Ambulance. It was run by Wiltshire Ambulance Service and later by the now-defunct Great Western Ambulance Service, which was the sole trustee.

In October 2011, the Wiltshire Air Ambulance Charitable Trust (WAACT) was formed to run Wiltshire Air Ambulance. The new charity was independent of the ambulance service. The charity paid about £700,000 annually, a third of the operating cost, with Wiltshire Police paying the remainder. The collaboration with Wiltshire Police ended on 31 December 2014, due to the force joining the National Police Air Service.

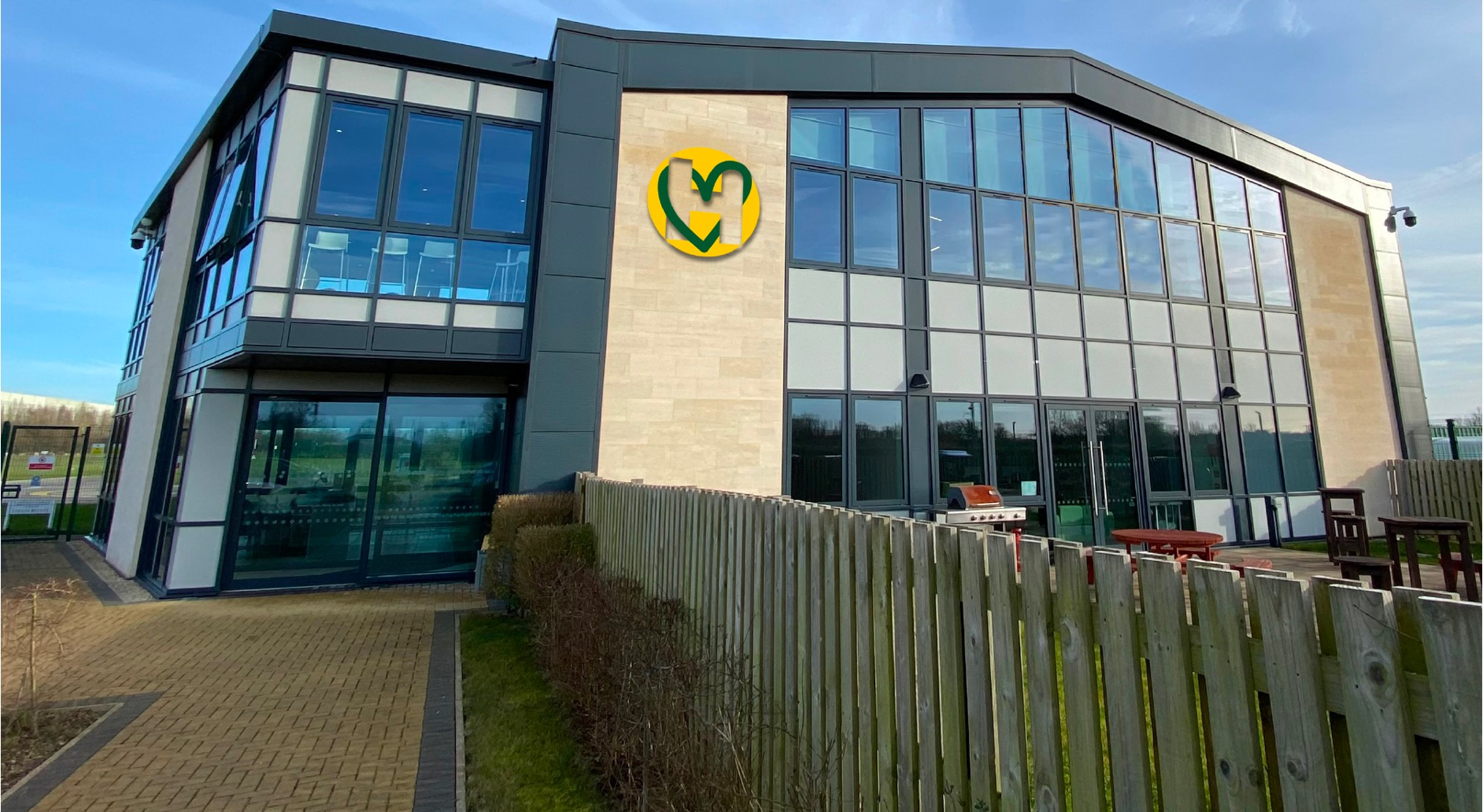
Wiltshire and Bath Air Ambulance Charity's airbase

On 9 January 2015, Wiltshire Air Ambulance began operations as a stand-alone air ambulance. The charity leased the Devizes airbase while a new airbase and administrative headquarters were built at Outmarsh, between Melksham and Semington. The new site became fully operational in June 2018, and was formally opened by Camilla, Duchess of Cornwall in December of that year.

In 2019, the charity – whose fundraising target had now increased to £3.75 million – received their own Air Operator Certificate (AOC), which had previously been managed by the now defunct Heli Charter. At the time, Wiltshire Air Ambulance was one of only four charities to hold their own AOC.

The charity saw its annual costs rise again in 2022 to £4 million as the charity enhanced its care by increasing the number of pre-hospital consultants (critical care doctors) shifts on its rota.

In 2023, the charity was deployed on 1,167 missions, of which the helicopter attended 646 (55%) and the two road vehicles attended 521. including 181 missions in Swindon, 70 in Salisbury and 96 in Bath.

In November 2024, the charity renamed as Wiltshire and Bath Air Ambulance Charity, to reflect their true operational area, and also updated their logo and colours. This was the first change to the charity's logo in over ten years and improves accessibility for the charity's brand.

== Aircraft ==
The helicopter in use is a Bell 429 GlobalRanger, the first of its type to operate as an air ambulance in the UK. It has a range of 400 miles (640 km) and a top speed of 150 knots (170 mph; 280 km/h), enabling it to reach anywhere in the county within a short time.

The normal crew configuration is one pilot and two paramedics, or one pilot, a paramedic and a doctor. The five pilots are employed by the charity, while the paramedics are seconded from South Western Ambulance Service. The charity pays for six of the twelve paramedics' salaries. The aircraft is fitted with an Aerolite medical interior. On board is all the kit found on a land ambulance, with extra specialist equipment, all paid for by donations.

The helicopter's registration is G-WLTS and its callsign is Helimed 22. In 2018, the helicopter flew 494 missions, and the team responded to a further 609 incidents by road. In 2019, the number of incidents rose 12% to 1,223 and 920 of these were attended by road, owing to the grounding of the helicopter for most of the year.

== Operational challenges ==
=== 2018 service interruptions ===
The helicopter was out of service for over a month in June and July 2018, while a technical failure was investigated. Flight operations were also suspended for two weeks in August 2018 as the aircraft, vehicles and airbase buildings were examined to ensure no contamination resulting from the 2018 Amesbury poisonings was present. The aircraft did not respond to the poisonings as it was again grounded due to a technical failure, but there was concern that traces of Novichok agent may have been transferred onto equipment used by critical care paramedics who responded in rapid response vehicles (RRV). The charity later said the interruption had resulted in additional costs of £100,000.

=== 2019 grounding ===
In early January 2019, the helicopter was grounded after an incident during pre-flight checks, which was similar to the June 2018 incident. The situation was complicated by the entry into voluntary liquidation of Heli Charter, who supplied the aircraft and were the holder of the air operator certificate (AOC). Medical provision continued by way of RRV, before the service returned to flying on 11 January 2019 with the delivery of a temporary MD 902 supplied by Specialist Aviation Services, the company that supplied the aircraft shared with Wiltshire Police until 2014.

The charity declared its intention to apply for its own AOC to allow it to operate the Bell 429 directly, but cautioned that this could not occur until the cause of the January incident had been established. In response to this incident and two more elsewhere, the helicopter's manufacturer issued changes to the Flight Manual in April. The Civil Aviation Authority (CAA) completed inspections in August and issued the AOC in November, enabling the Bell 429 to re-enter service. The CAA's delay had been criticised by local MP Michelle Donelan in October, and in December Private Eye magazine claimed that the CAA had "dragged its feet" and stated that the charity had made a formal complaint to the CAA.

In April 2020, the Air Accidents Investigation Branch (AAIB) published their report into the 2018 and 2019 incidents, which were together classed as a "serious incident". The report called for Bell Textron, the helicopter manufacturer, to improve the procedure for conduct of the Power Assurance Check; Bell also undertook to make future improvements to the flight control system software. The AAIB also found that the cockpit voice recorder had been affected by the fitting of TETRA communications equipment in 2015, and the defect had not been found during annual checks by the recorder's manufacturer, leading to a recommendation to the European Aviation Safety Agency regarding checks to be made after adding equipment.

== Finances ==
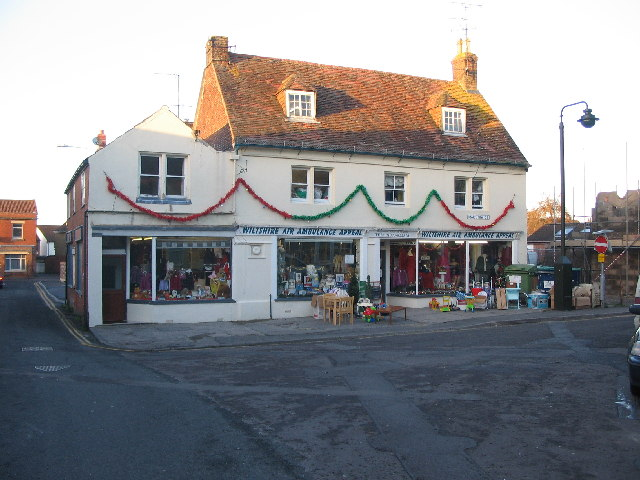
Former Wiltshire Air Ambulance charity shop in Westbury

The charity raises money from several sources, including raffles and a lottery (which provided over 30% of the charity's income in 2019), collection tins, community fundraising, corporate fundraising, a shop, and legacies.

In the year ending October 2024, income was £5.3 million. Total expenditure was £5.4M, of which £4.4M (81%) was spent to deliver the charitable service. It has 37 employees, eight of whom are paid more than £60,000.

The charity operates a shop on Maryport Street in Devizes. A second shop in Westbury closed in March 2020.

== See also ==
- Air ambulance services in the United Kingdom
