= Redstocks =

Coordinates: 51.363°N 02.099°W

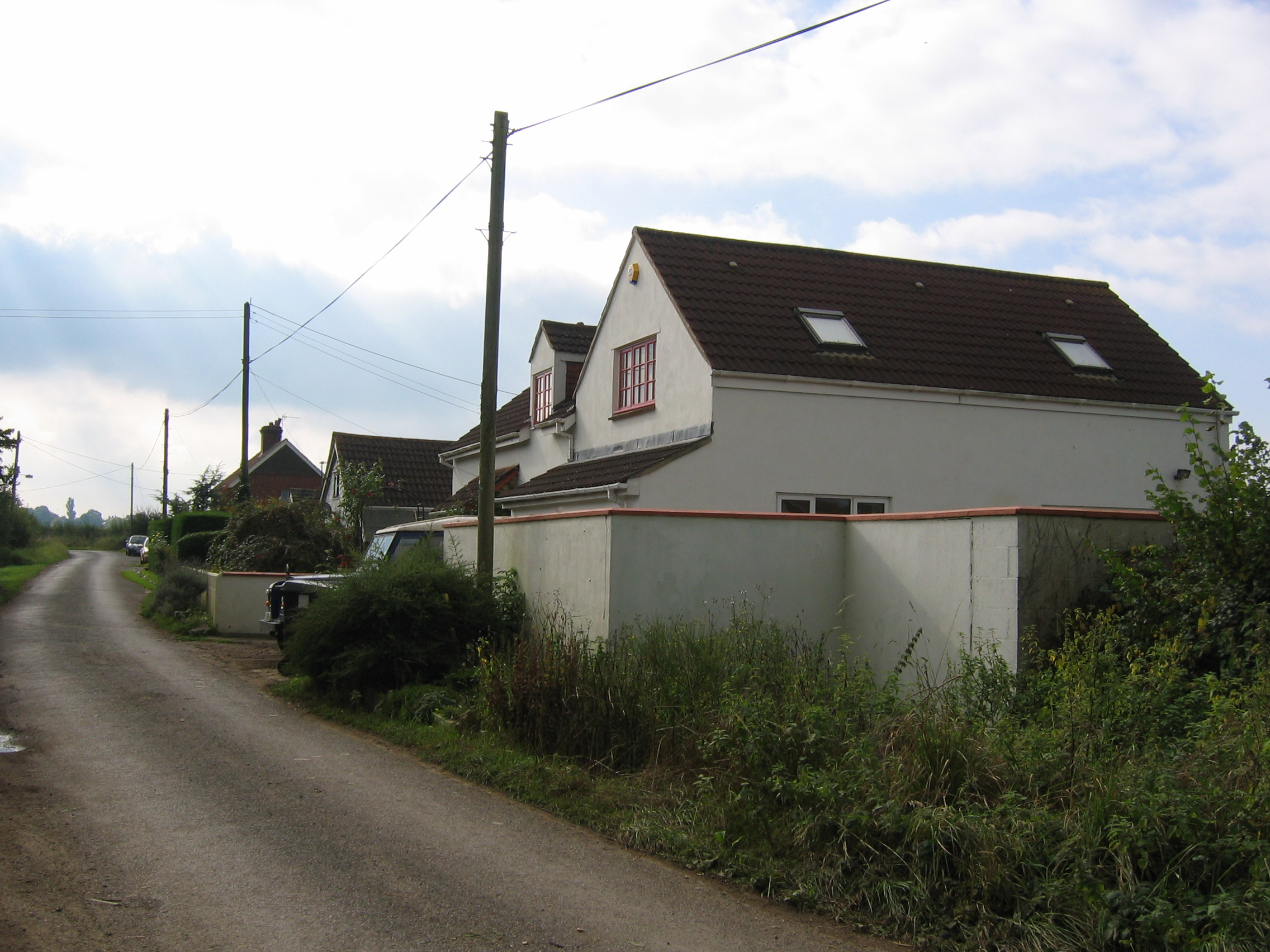
- Main road

- Location within Wiltshire
- OS grid reference: ST932627
- Civil parish: Melksham Without
- Unitary authority: Wiltshire
- Ceremonial county: Wiltshire
- Region: South West
- Country: England
- Sovereign state: United Kingdom
- Post town: Melksham
- Postcode district: SN12
- Dialling code: 01380
- Police: Wiltshire
- Fire: Dorset and Wiltshire
- Ambulance: South Western
- UK Parliament: Melksham and Devizes

Redstocks is a hamlet in Wiltshire, England; it is in the civil parish of Melksham Without and is 1.7 miles (2.7 km) east of Melksham.

From 1886 to 1950 there was a small Wesleyan Methodist chapel.
