= Semington Aqueduct =

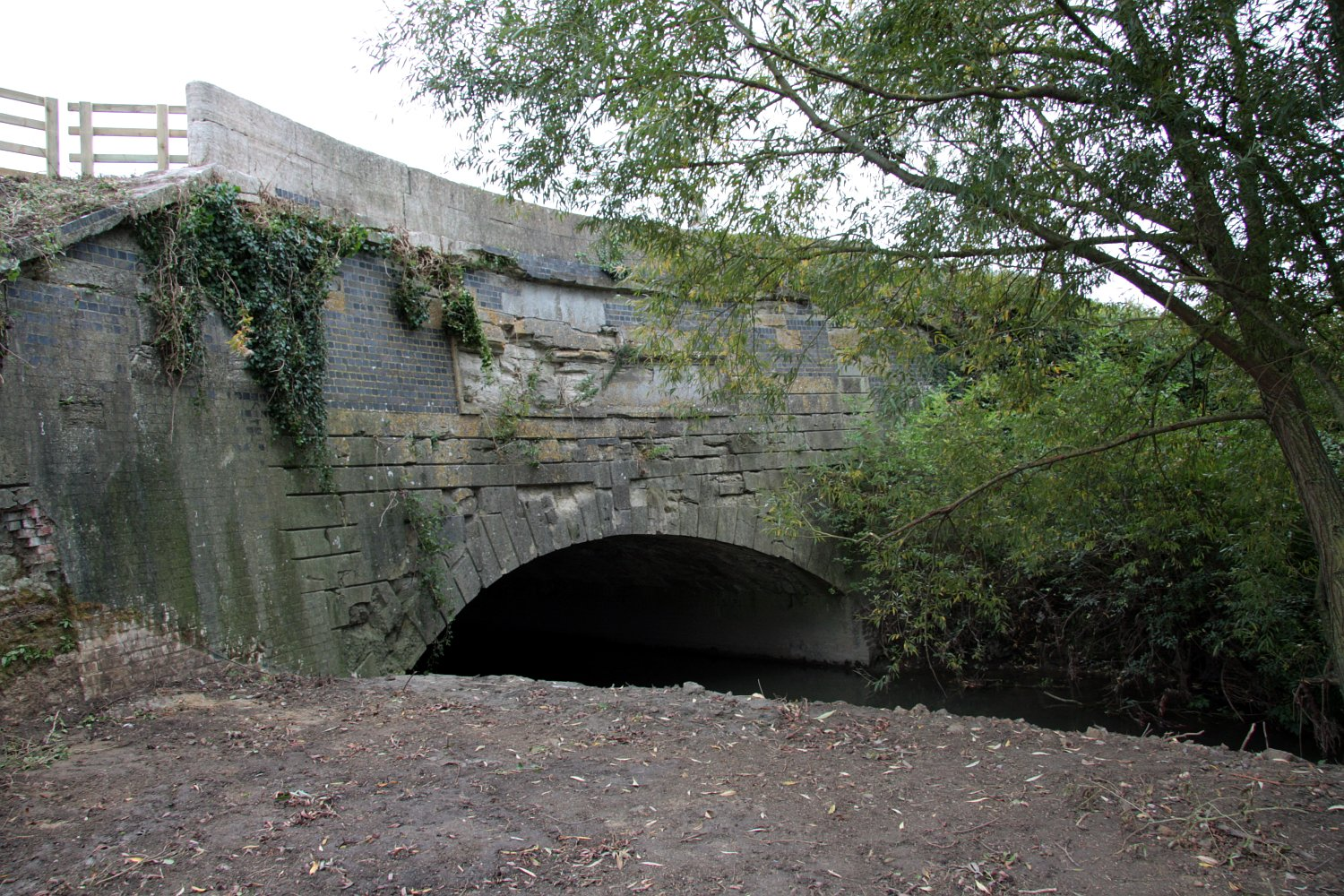
- Coordinates: 51.3476°N 2.1493°W
- OS grid reference: ST896609
- Carries: Kennet and Avon Canal
- Crosses: Semington Brook
- Locale: Semington
- Maintained by: British Waterways
- Heritage status: Grade II

Characteristics
- Total length: 46 feet (14.0 m)
- Width: 40 feet (12.2 m)
- Traversable?: Yes
- Towpaths: NW Side
- No. of spans: One

History
- Construction start: 1794
- Construction end: 1807

Semington Aqueduct (grid reference ST896609) is an aqueduct at Semington, Wiltshire, England, UK. It carries the Kennet and Avon Canal over the Semington Brook.

== History ==
The Kennet and Avon Canal was the realisation of a plan to link the River Avon to the River Thames and hence Bristol to London, which had first been suggested in the late 1500s, during the reign of Queen Elizabeth I. The canal was surveyed by John Rennie and following a change of route, which resulted in the canal passing through Devizes and hence Semington, rather than Marlborough and Calne, an Act of Parliament was obtained in 1794 to authorise the plan and work began. The eastern section opened first, with the line from Newbury and the River Kennet to Hungerford opening in 1798, and from there to Great Bedwyn opening the following year. The western section through Semington was partially complete by this time, and was finished by 1804, but there were two gaps to be filled. These were the locks at Bath which connected the canal to the River Avon, and those at Devizes, which overcame a difference in level of 237 feet (72 m), both of which were completed in 1810, enabling the canal to open throughout on 28 December.

Rennie's route passed to the north of Seend. To the west of the village, the Semington Brook flows northwards and then turns to the west, to join the Avon at Whaddon. The canal sweeps to the south to join the valley, and runs along its north bank to reach Semington. For the canal to head towards Trowbridge, a smaller bend was needed to cross the valley, with an aqueduct to carry it over the brook. The contract for the construction of the aqueduct was won by James McIlquham and James Porteous. Both had worked together on the Leeds and Liverpool Canal and Porteus had been asked by Rennie to quote for the aqueduct over the River Lune on the Lancaster Canal, but had failed to secure the contract. The contract for the Semington aqueduct also included construction of the aqueduct at Avoncliff, to the west of Bradford-on-Avon, and both were completed successfully, as the two men went on to win the contract for the Dundas Aqueduct at Limpley Stoke.

== Design ==
The aqueduct consists of a single stilted segmental arch, mainly constructed of limestone ashlar masonry, although some repairs have been made with engineering bricks. On both sides of the structure there is a rectangular moulded panel, but no evidence that it ever carried an inscription. It has been a grade II listed structure since 1988.

== See also ==
- List of canal aqueducts in the United Kingdom
- New Semington Aqueduct
- Semington Locks
