= Whitley, Wiltshire =

Village in Wiltshire, England

Coordinates: 51.396°N 2.167°W

Whitley
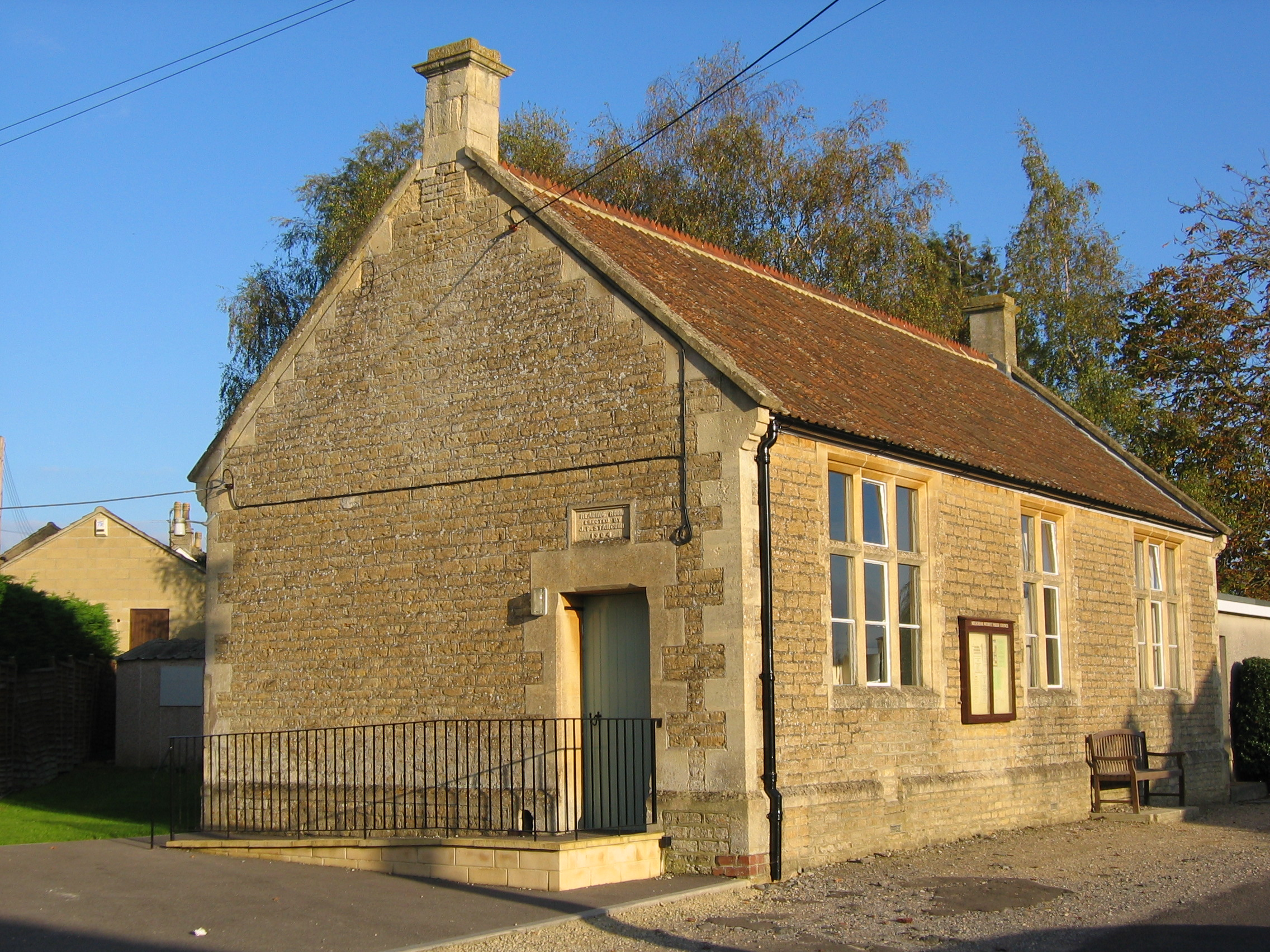
- Reading Rooms, Whitley

- Location within Wiltshire
- Population: 1,914
- OS grid reference: ST885663
- Civil parish: Melksham Without
- Unitary authority: Wiltshire
- Ceremonial county: Wiltshire
- Region: South West
- Country: England
- Sovereign state: United Kingdom
- Post town: Melksham
- Postcode district: SN12
- Dialling code: 01225
- Police: Wiltshire
- Fire: Dorset and Wiltshire
- Ambulance: South Western
- UK Parliament: Melksham and Devizes

Whitley is a village in the civil parish of Melksham Without, Wiltshire, England, which had a population of 1,914 at the 2011 census. The village lies about 2 miles (3.2 km) northwest of Melksham on the B3353 Shaw to Corsham road. The hamlet of West Hill is to the west, on the road to Atworth.

== History ==
The manor of Whitley was recorded in the 13th century and became a tithing of Melksham parish. The village name means a "white clearing" in a wood. It consists of three settlements, Upper, Middle and Lower Whitley, linked by the Atworth to Lacock road. Whitley House dates from the late seventeenth century. Whitley Farmhouse, Slade's Farmhouse and the Pear Tree Inn all date to the late seventeenth century, and Westlands Farmhouse and Northey's Farmhouse to the early eighteenth. Cottages were added to the village throughout the eighteenth and nineteenth centuries, but substantial infill only took place in the twentieth century. Lower Whitley, around Westlands Farm, remains relatively undeveloped.

Melksham Without parish was formed under the Local Government Act 1894, when Whitley was united with the nearby settlements of Beanacre and Shaw.

== Amenities ==
A Methodist chapel was built in 1828 and replaced by a new building at Top Lane in 1867. As of 2015 this building continues in regular use as Whitley Methodist Church, having been altered and extended in 1985 and 2013. The village has no church but since 1838 has been served by Christ Church at nearby Shaw.

Whitley has a golf club and a pub, the Pear Tree Inn, dating from the late 17th century with a 19th-century interior. There is a village hall, the Reading Rooms, built in 1904.
