= Semington Locks =

Canal lock in Semington, Wiltshire, England

Coordinates: 51.34709°N 2.14497°W

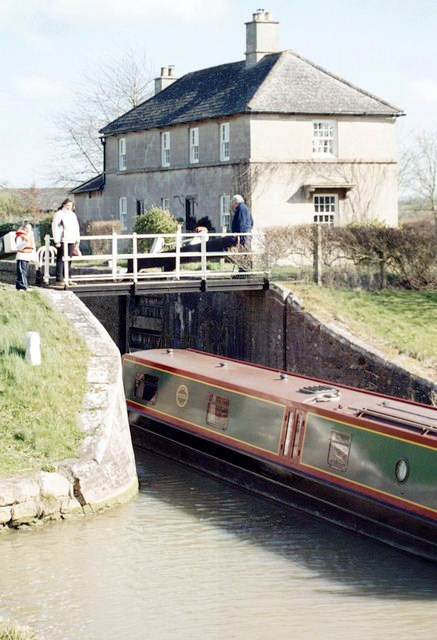
Lock keepers cottage, by Buckley's Lock at Semington

The Semington Locks (grid reference ST900609) are situated at Semington, Wiltshire on the Kennet and Avon Canal, England.

They have a combined rise/fall of 16 feet 1 inch (4.9 m).

The two locks at Semington are known as Buckley's (No.15) and Barrett's (No.16).

Adjacent to the locks is the point at which the former Wilts and Berks Canal joined the Kennet and Avon.

Close by, the Grade II listed Semington Aqueduct carries the canal over the Semington Brook. East of the locks, the canal crosses the New Semington Aqueduct, built in 2004 to bridge the newly constructed Semington village bypass (A350 road).

== See also ==
- Locks on the Kennet and Avon Canal
- New Semington Aqueduct
- Semington Aqueduct

Next lock upstream	Kennet and Avon Canal	Next lock downstream
Seend Locks	Semington Locks; Grid reference: ST900609	Bradford Lock
