= Beanacre =

Village in Wiltshire, England

Coordinates: 51.393°N 2.140°W

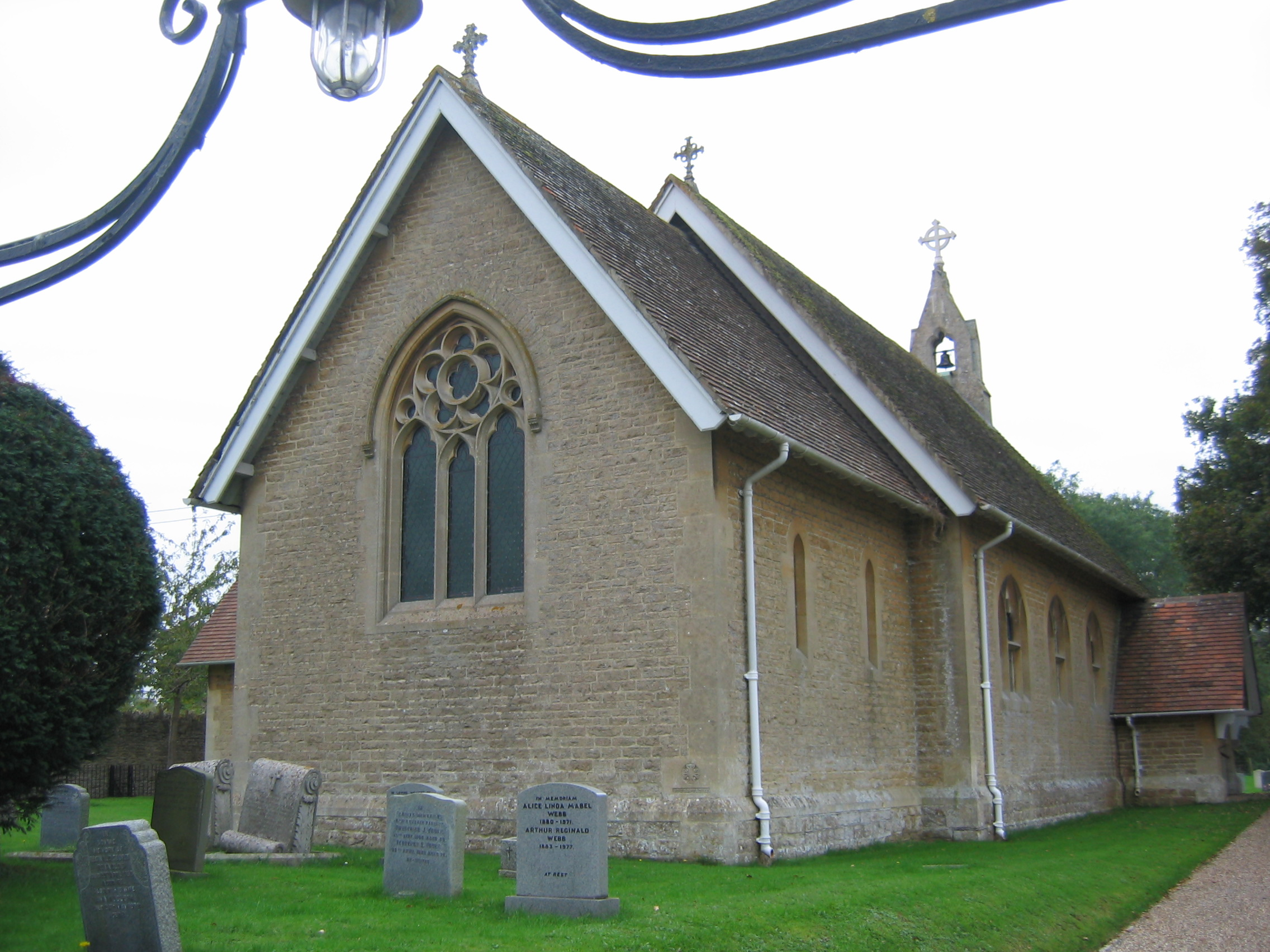
- Church of St. Barnabas

- Location within Wiltshire
- OS grid reference: ST904660
- Civil parish: Melksham Without
- Unitary authority: Wiltshire
- Ceremonial county: Wiltshire
- Region: South West
- Country: England
- Sovereign state: United Kingdom
- Post town: Melksham
- Postcode district: SN12
- Dialling code: 01225
- Police: Wiltshire
- Fire: Dorset and Wiltshire
- Ambulance: South Western
- UK Parliament: Melksham and Devizes

Beanacre is a small village in Wiltshire, England, about 1.5 miles (2.4 km) north of Melksham on the A350 towards Chippenham. It is in the civil parish of Melksham Without. The Bristol Avon passes to the east of the village where a stream from Sandridge joins it.

== History ==
Beanacre is first mentioned in the 13th century. Earlier spellings of Bennecar or Benecar are shown on Andrews' and Dury's maps of 1773 and 1810. It is probably the oldest settlement in the parish of Melksham Without and was owned by Amesbury Abbey. It seems to have grown up clustered around the Old Manor, although none of the other houses now existing precede the 17th century. Since then, the village has expanded northwards.

== Railway ==
In 1848 the Wilts, Somerset and Weymouth Railway company built their line close to the west side of Beanacre, to link the Swindon-Bath line (near Chippenham) with Westbury via Melksham and Trowbridge; the line was handed over to the Great Western Railway in 1850 and is still in use.

From 1905 to 1955 there was a small station, Beanacre Halt, on the outskirts of the village on the road towards Whitley. The halt was designed to provide local services using steam railmotors. It opened for passenger services on 29 October 1905.

The War Office bought six and a half acres just south of the halt in 1938 and built sidings to handle transfer of munitions to/from underground storage at Eastlays Quarry (between Gastard and Whitley). The sidings were taken out of use in 1948. Beanacre Halt closed to passenger services from 7 February 1955.

== Notable buildings ==
Beanacre Old Manor is from the 14th century, with later renovation and additions including a chapel of c. 1500, and is Grade I listed. Pevsner describes the house as "a most interesting survival". Not far away is Beanacre Manor, c. 1600 with a 17th-century dairy, and Grade II* listed. The Victoria County History traces the ownership of both these houses.

Beechfield House was built c. 1870 for Richard Keevil, a local gentleman farmer. It is now a hotel.

== Religious sites ==
The Anglican Church of St Barnabas was built in 1886, in 13th-century style, and is a chapel of ease for the parish church of St Michael, Melksham; the 14th-century font came from there.

A Baptist chapel was built in 1846 and closed in 1967.

== Notable people ==
James Nash (1834–1913), born into a Beanacre family of farm labourers, emigrated to Queensland, Australia at the age of 23 and made an important discovery of gold.
