= Sandridge, Wiltshire =

Coordinates: 51.38°N 02.10°W

Sandridge
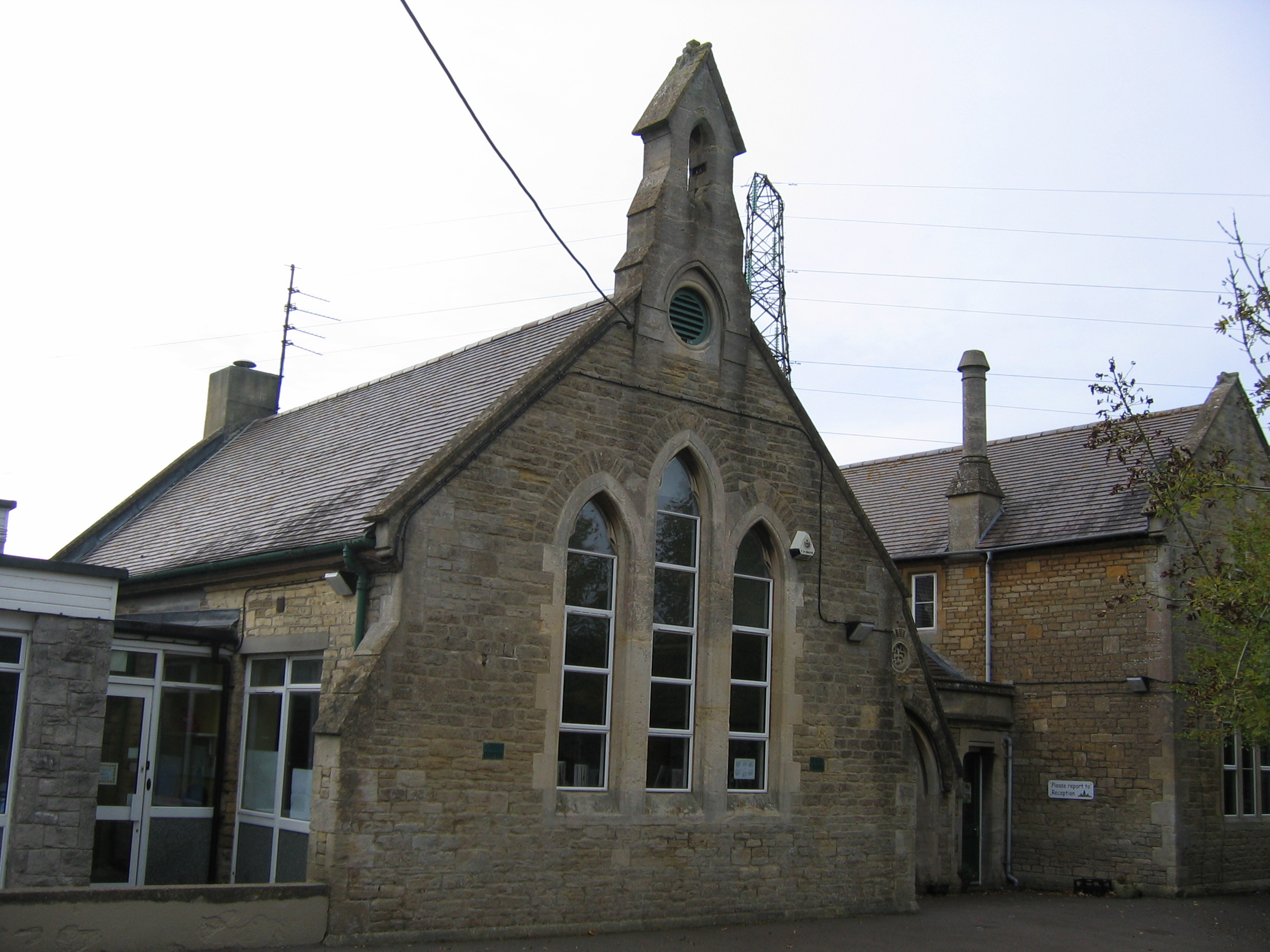
- Former Church of England School

- Location within Wiltshire
- OS grid reference: ST9364
- Civil parish: Melksham Without
- Unitary authority: Wiltshire
- Ceremonial county: Wiltshire
- Region: South West
- Country: England
- Sovereign state: United Kingdom
- Post town: Melksham
- Postcode district: SN12
- Post town: Chippenham
- Postcode district: SN15
- Dialling code: 01225
- Police: Wiltshire
- Fire: Dorset and Wiltshire
- Ambulance: South Western
- UK Parliament: Melksham and Devizes

Sandridge is a dispersed rural community to the east of Melksham, Wiltshire, England. It is part of the civil parish of Melksham Without.

An Ordnance Survey map of 1961 names a settlement at Sandridge Hill, 2.5 miles (4.0 km) east of Melksham, and a hamlet of Sandridge, 0.25 miles (0.4 km) to the north; as of 2015 these names are no longer in gazetteers and Sandridge refers to a wider area along the A3102, with Sandridge Common identified on road signs near Melksham.

A National School was built in 1873 at Sandridge Common, on land given by Ralph Ludlow Lopes and educated children of all ages until 1953; around that time it became known as Forest and Sandridge Church of England Primary School. In 2015, to cater for the eastward expansion of Melksham, the school moved to a new building on the outskirts of the town.

== Sandridge Park ==
Sandridge Park (not to be confused with Sandridge Park, Devon) is an ashlar-faced country house which stands in parkland north of the A3102, about 2 miles (3 km) east of Melksham. The two-storey house was built between 1856 and 1859 for Henry Lopes. After being used for a time as a hotel, it was sold in 2018 as an eight-bedroom house for £2.8m.

The former coach house and stables of the same date, now converted into a house, is Grade II listed. Further uphill on the other side of the road is Sandridge Tower, a former folly belonging to Sandridge Park, also now a house. Built in ashlar in the late 19th century, its four storeys are topped by a battlemented parapet.
