= Shaw, Melksham Without =

Village in Wiltshire, England

Coordinates: 51.390°N 2.162°W

Shaw
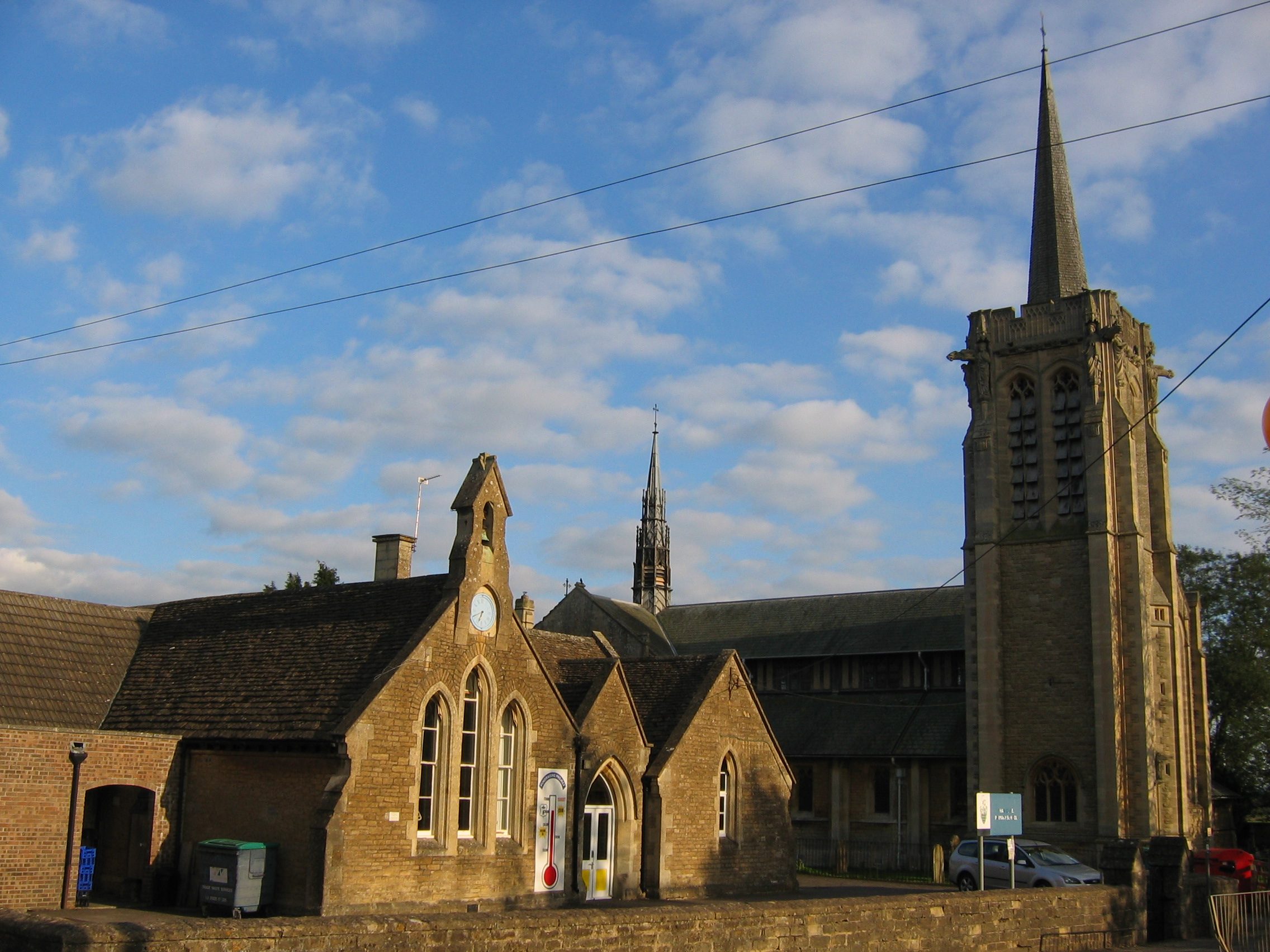
- Christ Church at Shaw

- Location within Wiltshire
- OS grid reference: ST888657
- Civil parish: Melksham Without
- Unitary authority: Wiltshire
- Ceremonial county: Wiltshire
- Region: South West
- Country: England
- Sovereign state: United Kingdom
- Post town: Melksham
- Postcode district: SN12
- Dialling code: 01225
- Police: Wiltshire
- Fire: Dorset and Wiltshire
- Ambulance: South Western
- UK Parliament: Melksham and Devizes

Shaw is a village in the civil parish of Melksham Without, Wiltshire, England. It is about 1.7 miles (2.7 km) northwest of Melksham on the A365 Melksham to Box road, where the B3353 diverges to Corsham.

== History ==
The manor of Shaw was recorded in the 13th century and became a tithing of Melksham parish. By 1335 there was a chapel of St Leonard, but there are no records of this chapel after 1460. The higher ground to the west of the village was known as Shaw Hill.

Shaw House, built in 1711 and extended c. 1840, is Grade II* listed. The house was used as a school in the early 19th century, as a home for the elderly in the 20th century, and as of 2015 has returned to residential use.

The Anglican Christ Church was built in 1838 to designs by T.H. Wyatt, and served Shaw and Whitley as a chapelry of the parish church at Melksham. This church proved to be too small and was rebuilt in 1905 to designs of C.E. Ponting at the expense of Charles Selwyn Awdry, who had served as High Sheriff of Wiltshire. The new church is in the Arts and Crafts Gothic style and is a Grade II* listed building, having been so designated on 13 February 1985.

== Amenities ==
The village has a primary school, Shaw CE Primary School, built next to the church in 1874 and extended in 1901, 1911, 1973, 2003 and 2009. Children of all ages were educated here until 1953. The Shaw & Whitley Community Hub established Whitley Stores Community Shop in the neighbouring village of Whitley in August 2021.

== Shaw Trust ==
The Shaw Trust was formed in the village in 1982 and grew into a national charity, helping over 50,000 disabled and disadvantaged people into independent living and employment each year. It also works with the Shaw Education Trust which runs a number of academy schools across the country.
