= Picket and Clanger Wood =

Woodland in Wiltshire, England

Coordinates: 51.287°N 2.179°W

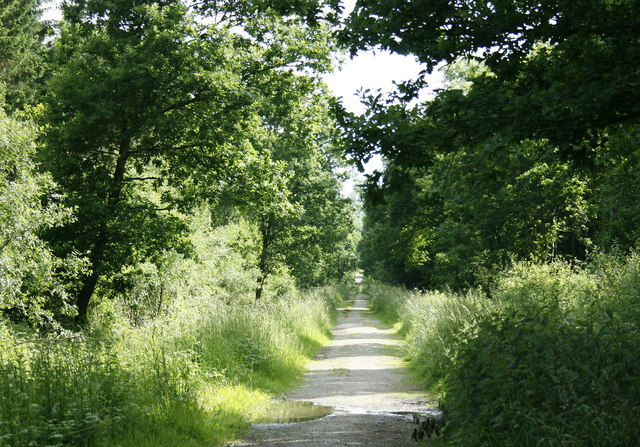
Clanger Wood

Picket and Clanger Wood (grid reference ST875543) is a 66.4 hectare biological Site of Special Scientific Interest in Wiltshire, England, which lies off the A350 national route between Trowbridge and Westbury. It was notified in 1989.
