= A361 road =

Longest three-digit road in England

A361

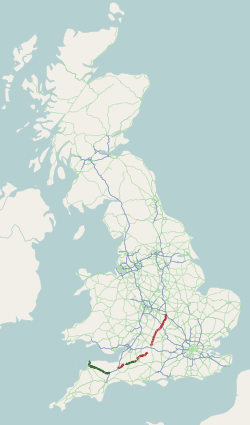

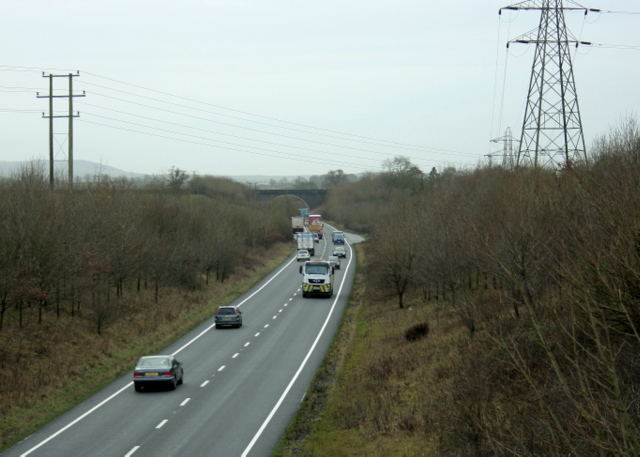
- The A361 bypassing Frome

Route information
- Length: 195 mi (314 km)

Major junctions
- South end: Ilfracombe
- A399 A3123; A39 A3125 A396; M5; A38 A372; A39; A37 A371 A359 A362 A3098; A36 A363 A350 A365 A342; A4 A4361 A419 A417; A40 A424; A44 A3400 A4260 A422 A423 M40; A45 A425; A5
- North end: Kilsby (near Rugby)

Location
- Country: United Kingdom
- Primary destinations: Barnstaple; Taunton; Glastonbury; Shepton Mallet; Frome; Trowbridge; Devizes; Swindon; Banbury

Road network
- Roads in the United Kingdom; Motorways; A and B road zones
| ← A360 | → A362 |

The A361 is an A class road in southern England, which at 195 miles (314 km) is the longest three-digit A road in the UK.

== History ==
When first designated in 1922, the A361 ran from Taunton (Somerset) to Banbury (Oxfordshire). It was later extended west through Bampton to South Molton (Devon), on the route of the former A398, and from South Molton to Barnstaple and Ilfracombe, previously part of the route of the A373. In 1988, when the North Devon Link Road was opened, the A361 was switched to its present route. The old route from Taunton through Bampton to South Molton was downgraded to become the B3227. In the 1970s the route was extended north from Banbury to Daventry (Northamptonshire), providing a link to the M1 motorway near Crick.

== Route ==
=== Devon ===
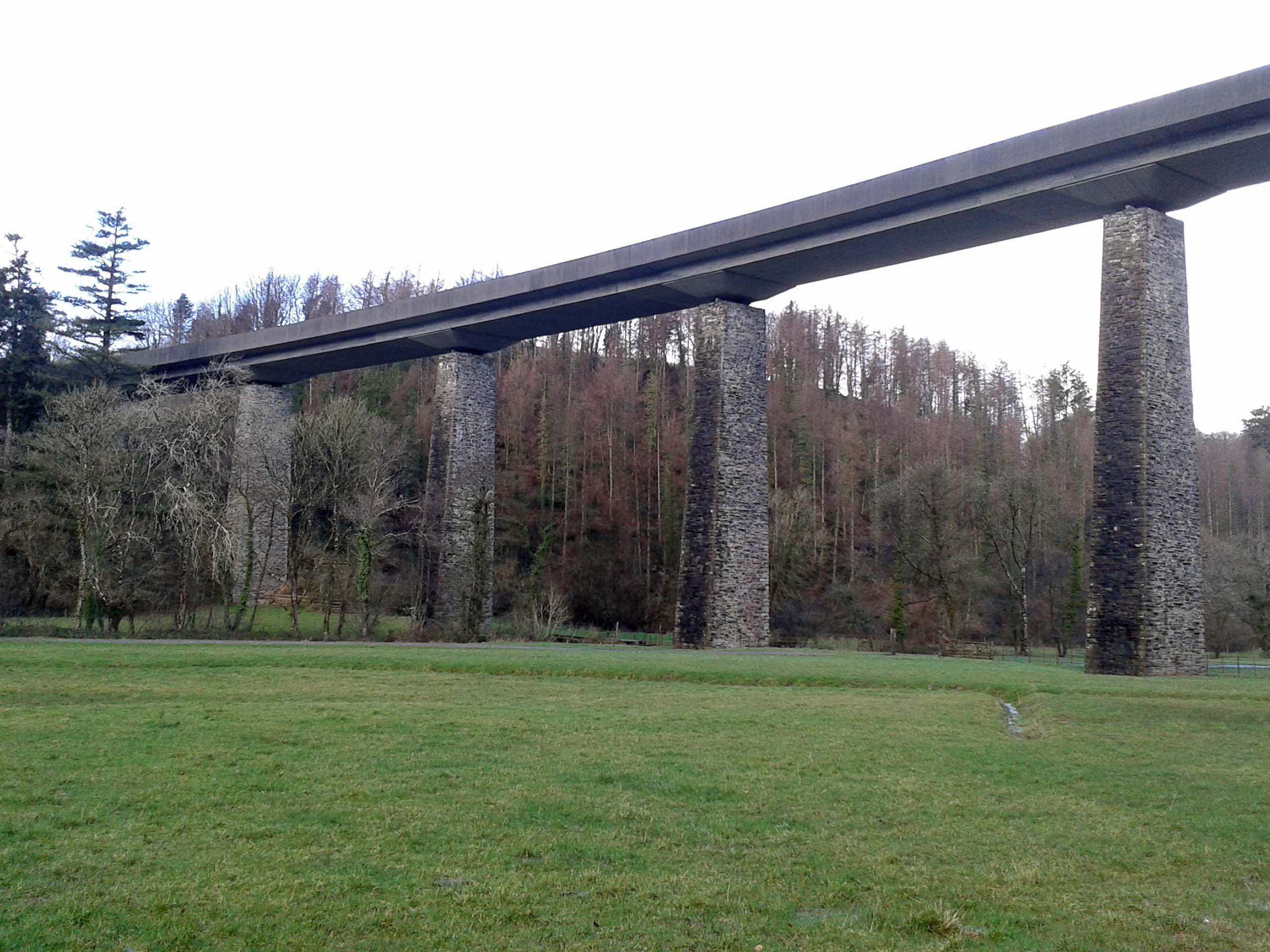
The pillars of Castle Hill Viaduct have been reused for the North Devon Link road

The road starts in Ilfracombe as part of the town's High Street, and is mostly single carriageway. The road passes through the villages of Knowle and Braunton, before becoming dual carriageway standard at Ashford, which continues for the short distance to Barnstaple. From there it passes the town's railway station then merges with the A39 for a short while before splitting back off near Portmore Golf Park. The section from Barnstaple to the M5 near Tiverton has been designated the North Devon Link Road, and enables relatively fast access to the Atlantic Highway, relieving pressure on the northern section of the A39 and A358. This section is a modern, wide single carriageway trunk road (which was de-trunked in 2002), apart from the 5-mile (8.0 km) stretch between Tiverton and the M5, which is dual carriageway. Tiverton Parkway railway station is situated close to the junction with the motorway in order to give easy rail connections for people driving from north Devon. Some sections of road are on the alignment of the Devon and Somerset Railway, including the Castle Hill Viaduct over the River Bray, where the stone pillars formerly used to support a lattice girder railway bridge now support the road.

=== Somerset and south Wiltshire ===
The road merges with the A38 from Junction 27 of the M5 until Taunton. The rest of the road, from there to Swindon, is largely county-road class. It crosses the Somerset Levels separating Curry Moor from North Moor and Salt Moor, where in flood conditions such as the winter of 2012/2013 the Athelney spillway runs across the road if the drain level at Curry Moor pumping station exceeds 7.1m, making the road impassable. Next, it passes by the towns of Street and Glastonbury and briefly merges with the A39 again. From there it continues northeast near Cranmore (the home of the East Somerset Railway) and originally passed through Frome, which it now bypasses to the east. It briefly merges with the A36 then passes through villages at Rode and into Wiltshire at Southwick. Here it is signposted alternatively via Trowbridge or through North Bradley and Yarnbrook (which could have been reached if the Frome bypass had continued to follow the railway) to merge with the A350 before diverging towards Devizes.

=== A4361 ===
From its junction with the A4 at Beckhampton, northwards through Avebury, the A361 has been renumbered the A4361 as it heads for Swindon town centre via Wroughton. It emerges near Stratton St Margaret, becoming the A361 again at the junction with the A419 which passes northeast of Swindon.

=== North Wiltshire and Gloucestershire ===
This road links Highworth to Lechlade and has no pavement for the entire length apart from a small section in Inglesham. It carries traffic at high speeds.

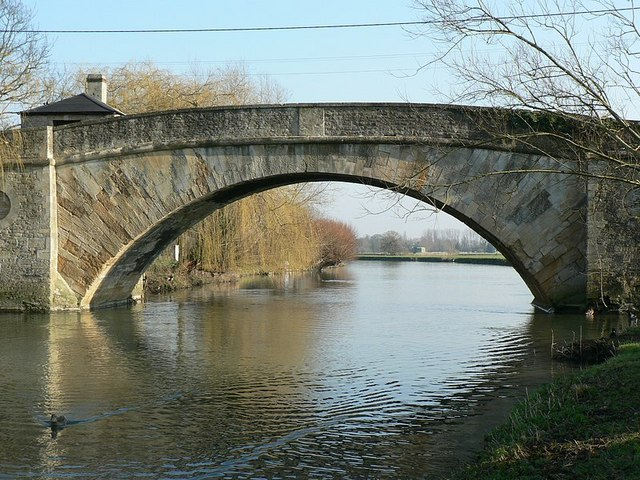
Grade II listed Halfpenny Bridge across the River Thames.

The Thames Path National Trail follows the verge for a little over one mile between Upper Inglesham and Inglesham. On entering Lechlade, the road crosses the Grade II listed Halfpenny Bridge, which marks the navigable limit of the River Thames for powered craft. Lines painted onto the panels on the bridge parapets indicate the border between the counties of Wiltshire (to the south) and Gloucestershire (to the north).

=== Oxfordshire ===
The road crosses into Oxfordshire a few miles north of Lechlade and heads towards Cotswold Wildlife Park, Burford and Chipping Norton passing many Oxfordshire villages on its way. It is also the boundary for the Cotswolds AONB at Lechlade. It then enters Banbury from the southwest as an arterial road passing the Banbury Cross, and heading north, the A361 multiplexes on the Southam Road roundabout of the A422. For about two miles the route is signed as A422, the dual carriageway Hennef Way until Junction 11 of the M40.

=== Northamptonshire ===
From there it heads northeast through the villages of Wardington, Chipping Warden, Byfield, Charwelton, and Badby. A relief road for Chipping Warden was constructed in 2021, in conjunction with neighbouring works for HS2. Sections of land were purchased in the 1970s after the road was upgraded from the B4038 to the A361 to straighten out some of the sharper corners but the vast majority of these works were never done. The road then multiplexes once more, this time with the A45 just outside Daventry. Once the A45 leaves Daventry for Coventry, the remaining section of single carriageway ring road is signed as A361, before it once again turns north to Kilsby to terminate on the A5 at its northern end.

== Points of interest ==
| Point | Coordinates (Links to map resources) | OS Grid Ref | Notes |
|---|---|---|---|
| Start: Ilfracombe | 51.2053°N 4.1270°W | SS514473 | Ilfracombe |
| Jnc 27, M5 | 50.9177°N 3.3562°W | ST047140 | Tiverton Parkway railway station |
| Halfpenny Bridge | 51.6924°N 1.6924°W | SU213993 | Lechlade |
| Jnc 11, M40 | 52.0727°N 1.3133°W | SP472418 | Banbury |
| End: Kilsby | 52.3340°N 1.1730°W | SP563710 | Kilsby |
