= Yarnbrook =

- Hamlet
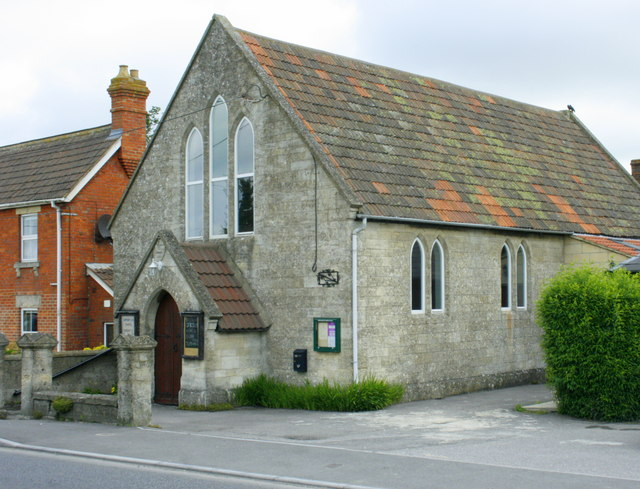
- Baptist Chapel, Yarnbrook

- Location within Wiltshire Location within England Location within the United Kingdom
- Coordinates: 51.295°N 2.191°W
- Country: United Kingdom
- Constituent Country: England
- County: Wiltshire

Yarnbrook is a large hamlet in Wiltshire, England, between the towns of Westbury and Trowbridge. Most of the settlement lies in the civil parish of North Bradley, the rest in West Ashton. Most of Yarnbrook's houses line the A350 road, running between the M4 motorway near Chippenham and the south coast of England at Poole, Dorset.

== History ==
Yarnbrook has never been a parish in its own right, but the name dates from at least the 16th century. In 1581 the Will of Agnes Guley, widow of Yarnbrook in North Bradley, was proved at Salisbury. In the Middle Ages Yarnbrook was within Selwood Forest, and the ancient woodland called Picket Wood which stands to the east of the present-day settlement is one of the few surviving areas of Selwood. The first edition of the Andrews and Dury map of Wiltshire (1773) shows only Bradley Mill and a few other houses at Yarnbrook.

The hamlet grew up around a crossroads where what is now the A350 meets the A363 and where a pub, now called the Longs Arms and Hungry Horse, was built in 1803. This was recorded as "the Long's Arms, Yarnbrook", in 1842.

Until 1805 a large area of common land called Yarnbrook Common stretched from Yarnbrook to the boundaries of Westbury, and after this was enclosed several terraces of small workmen's cottages were added to Yarnbrook. In 1874 a Baptist chapel was built to seat 120 people. After the First World War, housing development began to spread along the Westbury Road. In the mid 20th century a petrol filling station was opened at the former crossroads, immediately opposite the Longs Arms, and as traffic levels increased the crossroads was converted into a roundabout.
