= New Semington Aqueduct =

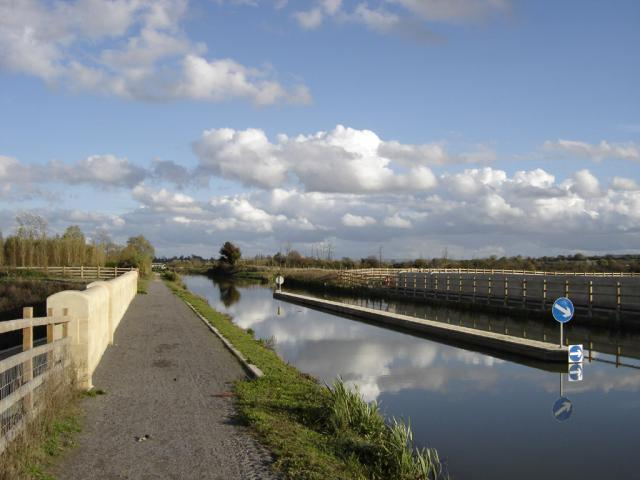
- Coordinates: 51.3472°N 2.1387°W
- OS grid reference: ST904609
- Locale: Semington
- Maintained by: British Waterways

Characteristics
- Total length: 30.3 metres (99 ft 5 in)
- Traversable?: Yes
- Towpaths: N side

History
- Opened: 2004

Location
- Interactive map of New Semington Aqueduct

New Semington Aqueduct (grid reference ST904609) carries the Kennet and Avon Canal over the carriageway of the A350 road Trowbridge Bypass, at Semington in west Wiltshire, England. Although the construction of new canals is no longer common practice in England, new aqueducts such as this are sometimes built in relation to new roads or road widening schemes.

== Details ==
The new aqueduct was built under the provisions of The Wiltshire County Council (Semington Aqueduct) Scheme 2000, later confirmed on 17 July 2002, as Statutory Instrument No. 1868. It was part of a road-building scheme to provide a bypass for the villages of Semington, to the west of the new structure, and Berryfield to the north of the canal, ending on the southern edge of Melksham. In order to provide the necessary headroom of 5.5 metres (18 ft 1 in), the road was built in a cutting at this point.

The new structure is on the line of the original canal. In order to allow it to be built without closing the canal for the duration of the project, the canal was temporarily diverted to the south of its existing route, from the head of Semington Top Lock to a point 220 metres (240 yd) to the east. Since the towpath is on the north bank of the canal at this point, temporary foot bridges were built over the canal, so that the towpath could follow the diversion, and avoid the work site. The road was planned as a dual carriageway, with the 30.3-metre (99 ft 4.9 in) structure resting on piers at both ends protected by wing walls and a pier built on the central reservation protected by safety barriers, but only one carriageway was built and there is no central pier. The area where the second carriageway would have been is grassed.

The aqueduct has two channels, separated by an 800-millimetre (31 in) central spine. Each of the channels is 5.4 metres (17 ft 9 in) wide by 2 metres (6 ft 7 in) deep, providing a navigable width of 5 metres (16 ft 5 in), since rubberised fenders are fitted to both sides to protect the concrete structure from abrasion by boats. There is another 800-millimetre (31 in) wall at the edge of the channel, and the 3.5-metre (11 ft 6 in) towpath on the north side is separated from it by a 1.5-metre (4 ft 11 in) environment corridor. A similar arrangement has been provided on the south side, for maintenance purposes. The concrete structure incorporates 529 tonnes of steel reinforcement, and the cost of the bypass scheme was £12 million. The aqueduct was opened on 3 March 2004 by Fleur de Rhé-Philipe, representing Wiltshire County Council. The structure was designed by Ove Arup and Partners, and built by the civil engineering contractor Alfred McAlpine.

== See also ==
- Semington Aqueduct
- Semington Locks
