= A363 road =

Road in England

A363

Major junctions
- North end: Bathford
- A4 A361 A366 A350
- South end: Yarnbrook

Location
- Country: United Kingdom
- Constituent country: England

Road network
- Roads in the United Kingdom; Motorways; A and B road zones

The A363 is a main road in the United Kingdom which runs through Bath and North East Somerset and Wiltshire. It provides a link between the small market towns of West Wiltshire and Bath, the M4 westbound, and the M5. It runs from the A4 at Bathford to the A350 at Yarnbrook, passing through Bradford-on-Avon and Trowbridge. It also links Westbury by merging with the A350.

== Route ==
The road starts off bypassing Bathford to the west. It then climbs up the hill known locally as Sally in the Woods, on the edge of the Cotswolds Area of Outstanding Natural Beauty, which has been the scene of a fatal accident.

The road summits at the turn-off to Monkton Farleigh, at an elevation of 144 metres. After this, the road widens and is straighter. This continues up to the approach to Bradford-on-Avon. Through Bradford-on-Avon itself, the road descends a steep 1 in 7 (14%) hill called Masons Lane. This is the road's main bottleneck since this leads to Bradford-on-Avon's only vehicle bridge over the River Avon (which splits the town in two), and at this stage travellers have merged with traffic from Melksham, Corsham and Chippenham (B3109) which is fed here.

The road passes on towards Trowbridge. 1/4 mile (400 m) after Town Bridge, traffic to Frome splits off upon the restart of the B3109 which had been concurrent with the A363 for a short distance, thus easing congestion. The road passes over a low hill, then descends into Trowbridge.

It is concurrent for a short distance with the A361, then emerges as Bradley Road. There are three roundabouts as the road goes through North Bradley via the White Horse Business Park, to the south. Until the 1980s it passed through North Bradley's residential lane, but since the opening of the business park, the older road through North Bradley became declassified. The A363 then terminates at a roundabout with the A350 in Yarnbrook.

When it was first designated in the 1920s, the road continued on from Yarnbrook as far as Chippenham, but by 1948 this stretch had been redesignated as a continuation of the A350.

== Points of interest ==
Point	Coordinates (Links to map resources)	OS Grid Ref	Notes
Bathford	51.4025°N 2.3096°W	ST784671	Bathford
Yarnbrook	51.2932°N 2.1903°W	ST867549	Yarnbrook
