= Semington =

Village in Wiltshire, England

Coordinates: 51.343°N 2.151°W

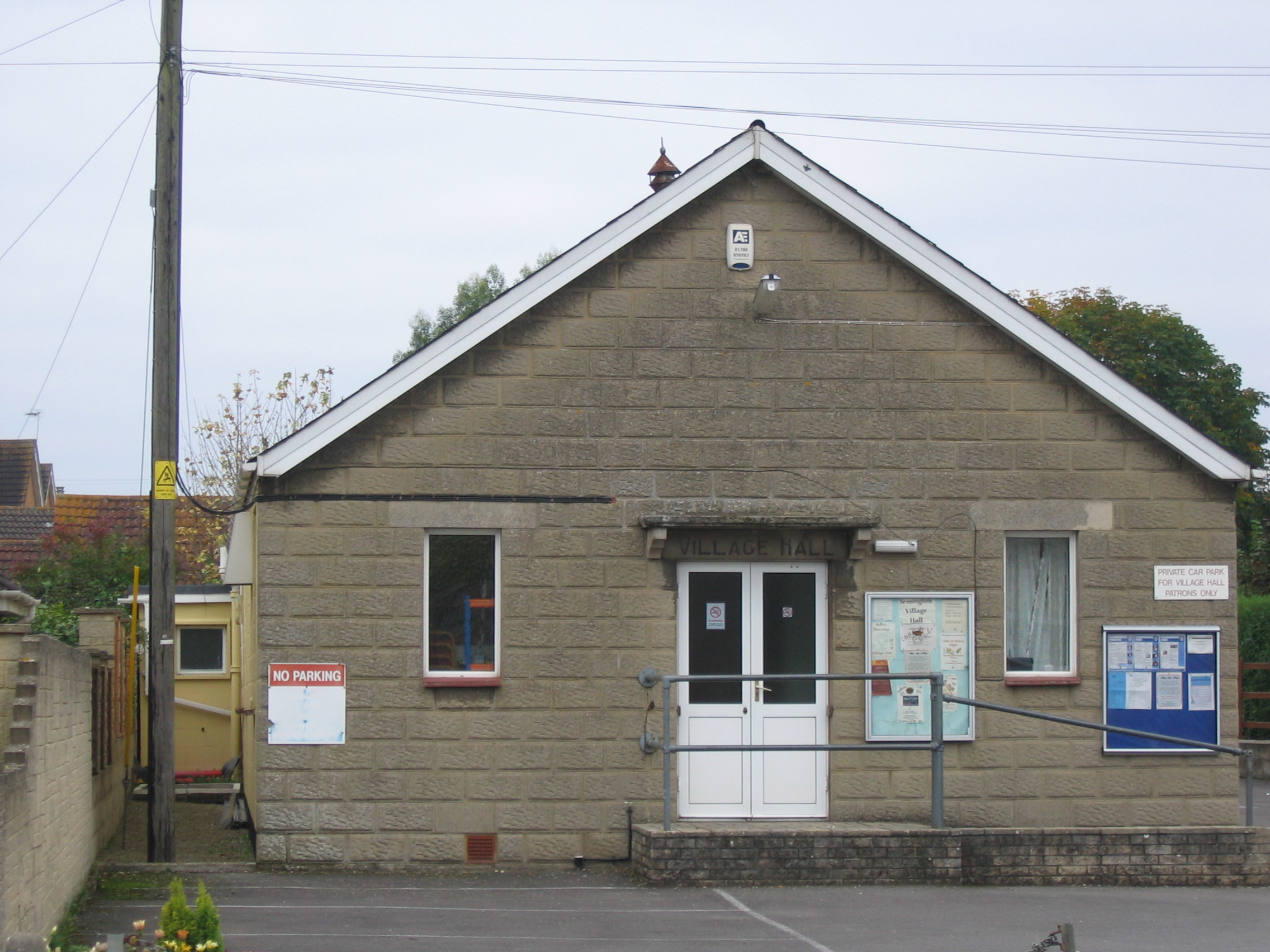
- Village hall

- Location within Wiltshire
- Population: 930 (2011 census)
- OS grid reference: ST896604
- Civil parish: Semington
- Unitary authority: Wiltshire
- Ceremonial county: Wiltshire
- Region: South West
- Country: England
- Sovereign state: United Kingdom
- Post town: Trowbridge
- Postcode district: BA14
- Dialling code: 01380
- Police: Wiltshire
- Fire: Dorset and Wiltshire
- Ambulance: South Western
- UK Parliament: Melksham and Devizes
- Website: Parish Council

Semington is a village and civil parish in Wiltshire, England. The village is about 2 miles (3 km) south of Melksham and about 3 miles (5 km) northeast of Trowbridge. The parish includes the hamlets of Little Marsh and Littleton.

The village has two locks on the Kennet and Avon Canal, known as the Semington Locks, and nearby is the start of the disused Wilts and Berks Canal.

== Geography ==
The Semington Brook, a westward-flowing tributary of the Avon, forms the east and north boundaries of the parish. Sometime after 1818, the central part of the northern boundary was realigned to follow the Kennet and Avon Canal.

Semington village developed along the main road from Melksham to Westbury which became the A350 primary route. In 2004 a bypass was opened, taking the A350 0.4 miles (0.64 km) east of the village.

Little Marsh (or Littlemarsh) is a hamlet south of Semington, along the old course of the A350. Littleton is no longer populated, and the only area currently designated as belonging to Littleton is the roundabout at the A350 and A361 road crossing.

== Governance ==
The civil parish elects a parish council. It is in the area of Wiltshire Council unitary authority, which is responsible for all significant local government functions.

== History ==
Anciently, Semington and Littleton were each tithings of Steeple Ashton parish (Semington village being about 2 1/4 miles (4 km) north of Steeple Ashton village). In the late 19th century the civil parish of Semington was formed from the two tithings, and in 1894 the ancient parish of Whaddon was added to it. Whaddon was transferred to Hilperton in the late 20th century.

The population of the parish was in the range 400 to 500 for many years, from the 1841 census to that of 1931. Numbers then gradually increased to reach 930 in 2011.

=== Canals ===
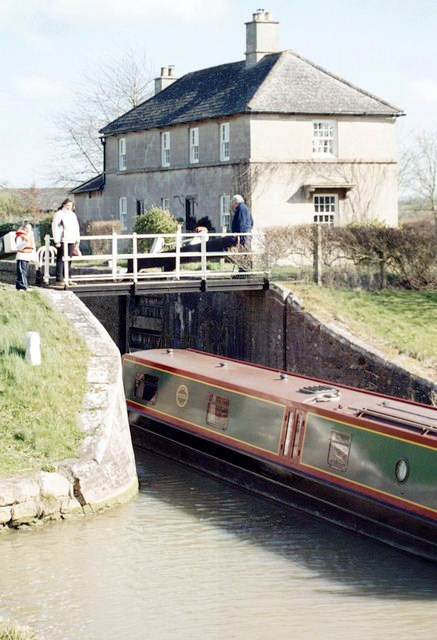
Several moorings and a narrow boat rental business on the Kennet and Avon canal attract frequent pleasure craft traffic

The Kennet and Avon Canal crosses marshy ground on an embankment on the northern edge of the village.

The two Semington locks were built between 1794 and 1802 under the supervision of the engineer John Rennie. They have a combined rise/fall of 16 ft 1 in (4.9 m). The two locks at Semington are known as Buckley's (numbered 15) and Barrett's (16).

Next to the locks is the point at which the Wilts & Berks Canal left the Kennet and Avon. The Wilts & Berks is disused but the Wilts & Berks Canal Trust is restoring it. East of the locks, the canal travels across the 2004 Semington Aqueduct, built to allow the A350 to bypass Semington village. Another aqueduct carries the canal over Semington Brook.

The canal, towpath and adjacent hedges are good for wildlife and in August 2007 water voles were seen.

=== Former railway ===
The Devizes Branch Line was built 0.6 miles (0.97 km) north of the village in 1857. A small station (Semington Halt) was opened in 1906 where the railway crossed both the A350 and the Wilts & Berks canal; the station and the line were closed in 1966.

=== Former workhouse ===
Just west of the village is the former St George's Hospital, built in 1836–38 as a workhouse for the Melksham poor law union to designs of H. E. Kendall. The nine-bay north front in classical style has two storeys and a three-bay pediment; behind this, further ranges of one, two and three storeys surround four courtyards. The front is limestone ashlar and the rear ranges are dressed limestone. Pevsner writes: "It is typical of the coming of the Victorian age how the classical and Grecian motifs get clumsy and extremely heavy".

In 1988, when the building was recorded as Grade II listed, it was in use as a hospital for people with learning disabilities. Today it is largely in residential use, while a charity providing advice to disabled people occupies the ground floor of one building.

=== World War II ===
During the Second World War, Semington was on GHQ Line which followed the path of the canal. Semington was designated as a centre of resistance: extensive anti-tank ditches were constructed to the east, south, and west of the village, these were overlooked by a number of pillboxes. The defences were constructed as a part of British anti-invasion preparations.

== Parish church ==
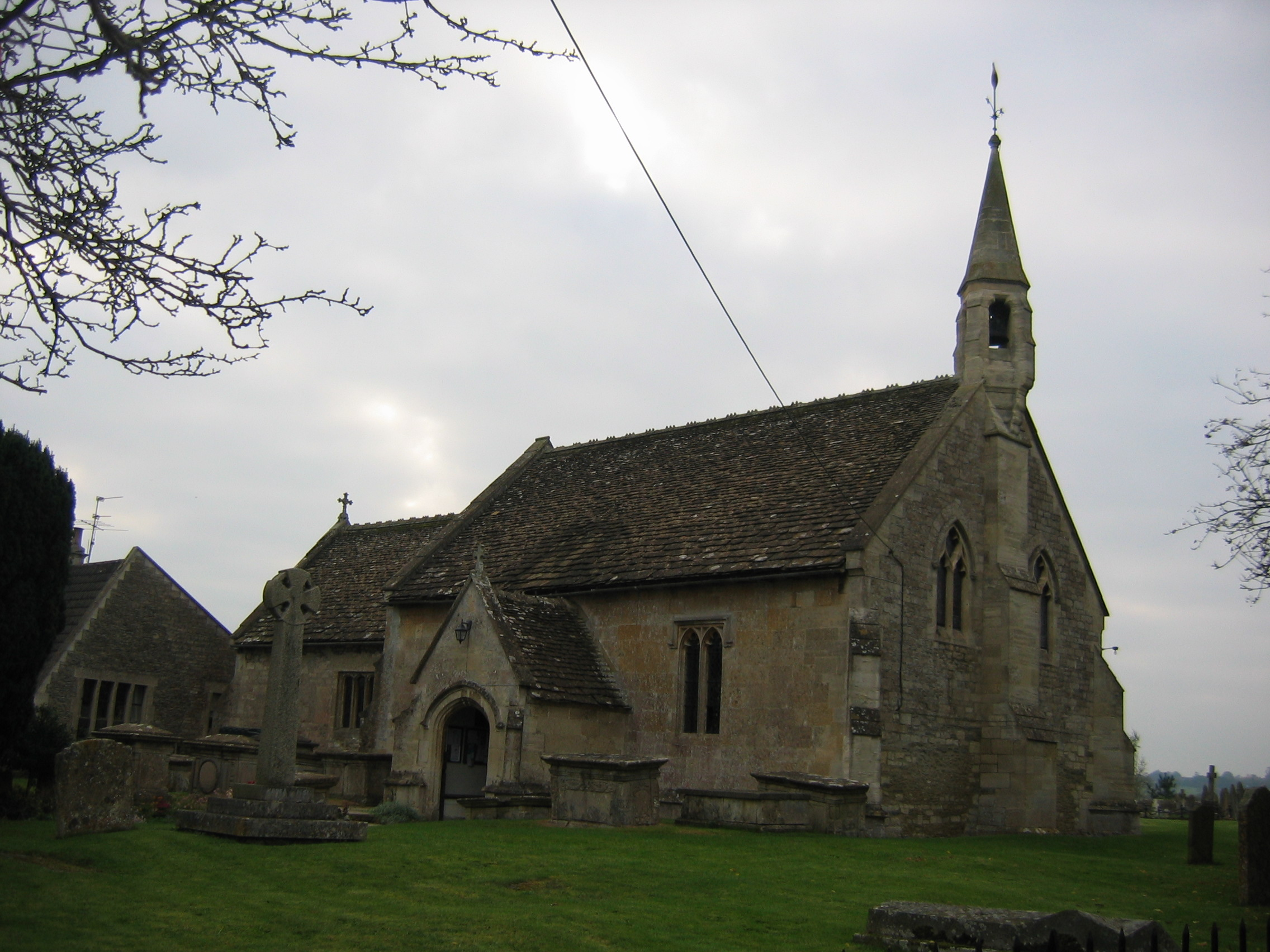
Church of St George

The Church of England parish church of St George is a Grade II listed building. It dates from the 15th century and was largely rebuilt in 1860. Anciently a chapelry of Steeple Ashton, Semington was made an independent parish in 2000, and today the parish is part of the Canalside Benefice alongside parishes in Hilperton and Whaddon.

== Amenities ==
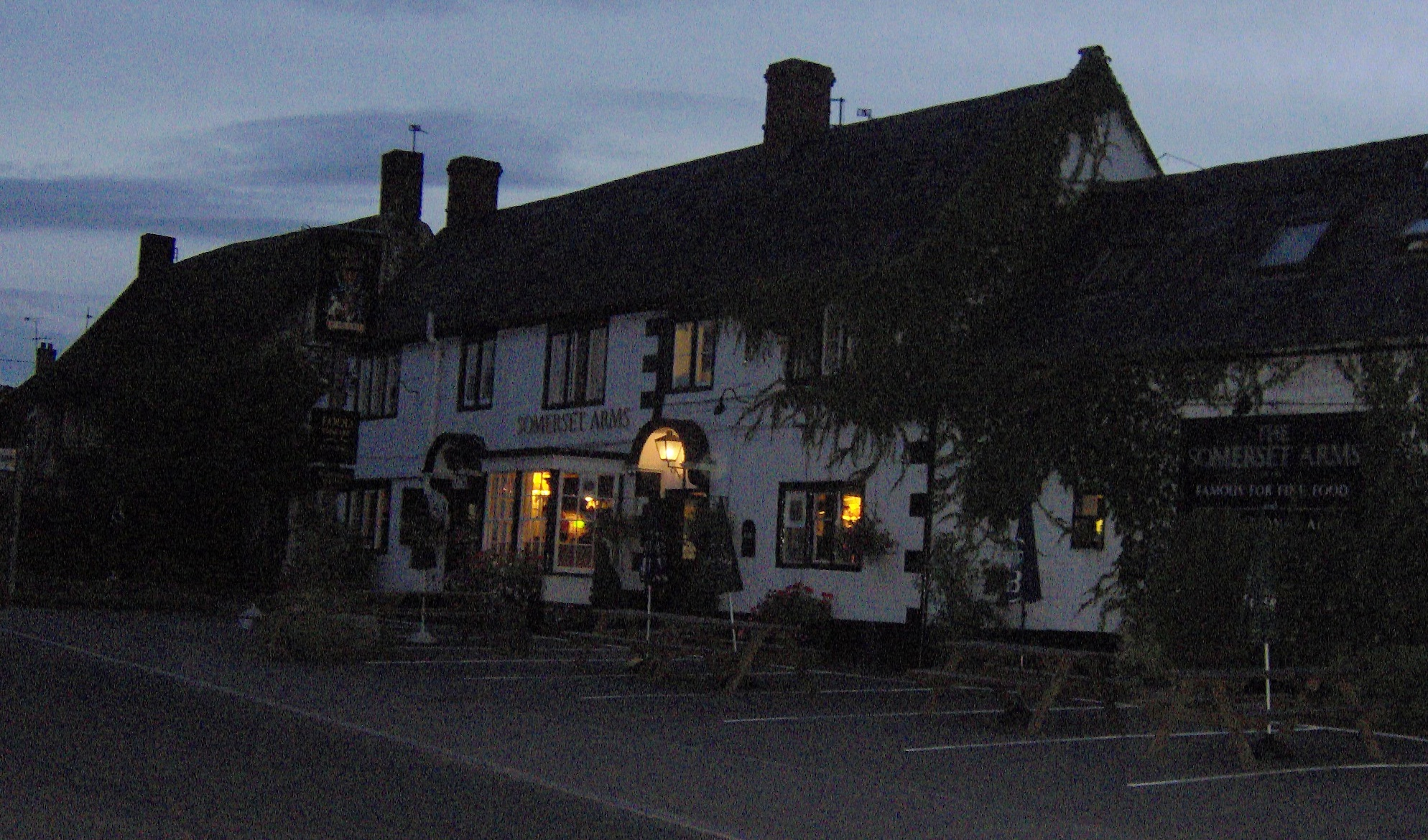
The Somerset Arms

Within the village there are over 500 houses, a primary school, a village hall, public tennis courts and a park for children. Semington has a pub, The Somerset Arms, an 18th-century building.

National Cycle Route 4 follows the canal towpath, and at the road bridge just north of Semington village, route 403 branches north to Melksham and beyond.

== Economy ==
About 1 km north of the village, in Melksham Without parish, is Hampton Park West business park which has the corporate headquarters of companies such as G-Plan, Avon Rubber plc and a Wiltshire Police operations centre.

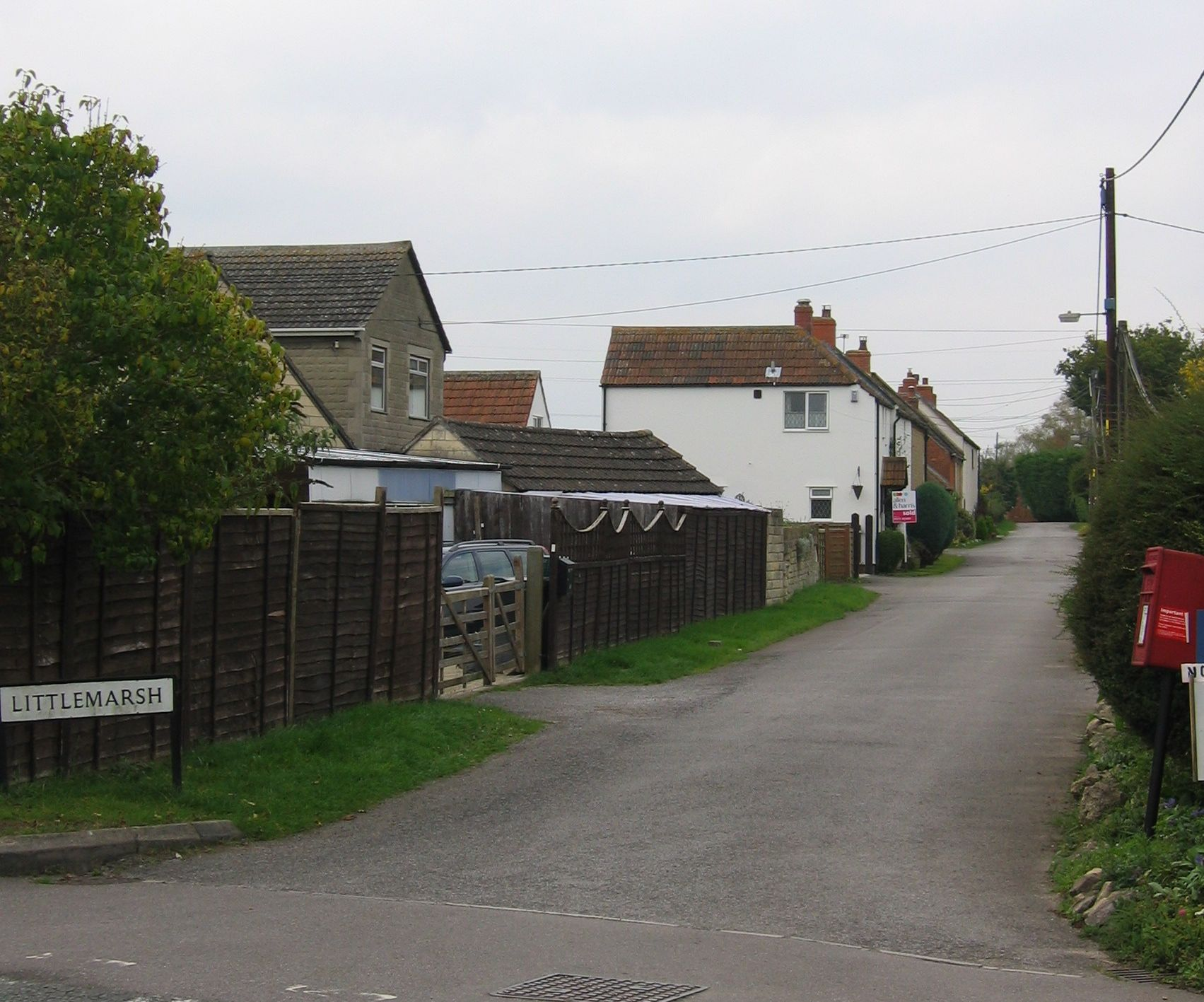
The hamlet of Littlemarsh is part of Semington parish

== Notable residents ==
- Isaac Gulliver (1745–1822), smuggler
- Thomas Helliker (1784–1803), trade union martyr, hanged for his alleged role in burning Littleton mill

== Sources ==
- Foot, William (2006). Beaches, fields, streets, and hills ... the anti-invasion landscapes of England, 1940. Council for British Archaeology. ISBN 1-902771-53-2.
- "Semington". Wiltshire Community History. Wiltshire Council.
