= Bowerhill =

Village in Wiltshire, England

Coordinates: 51.358°N 2.125°W

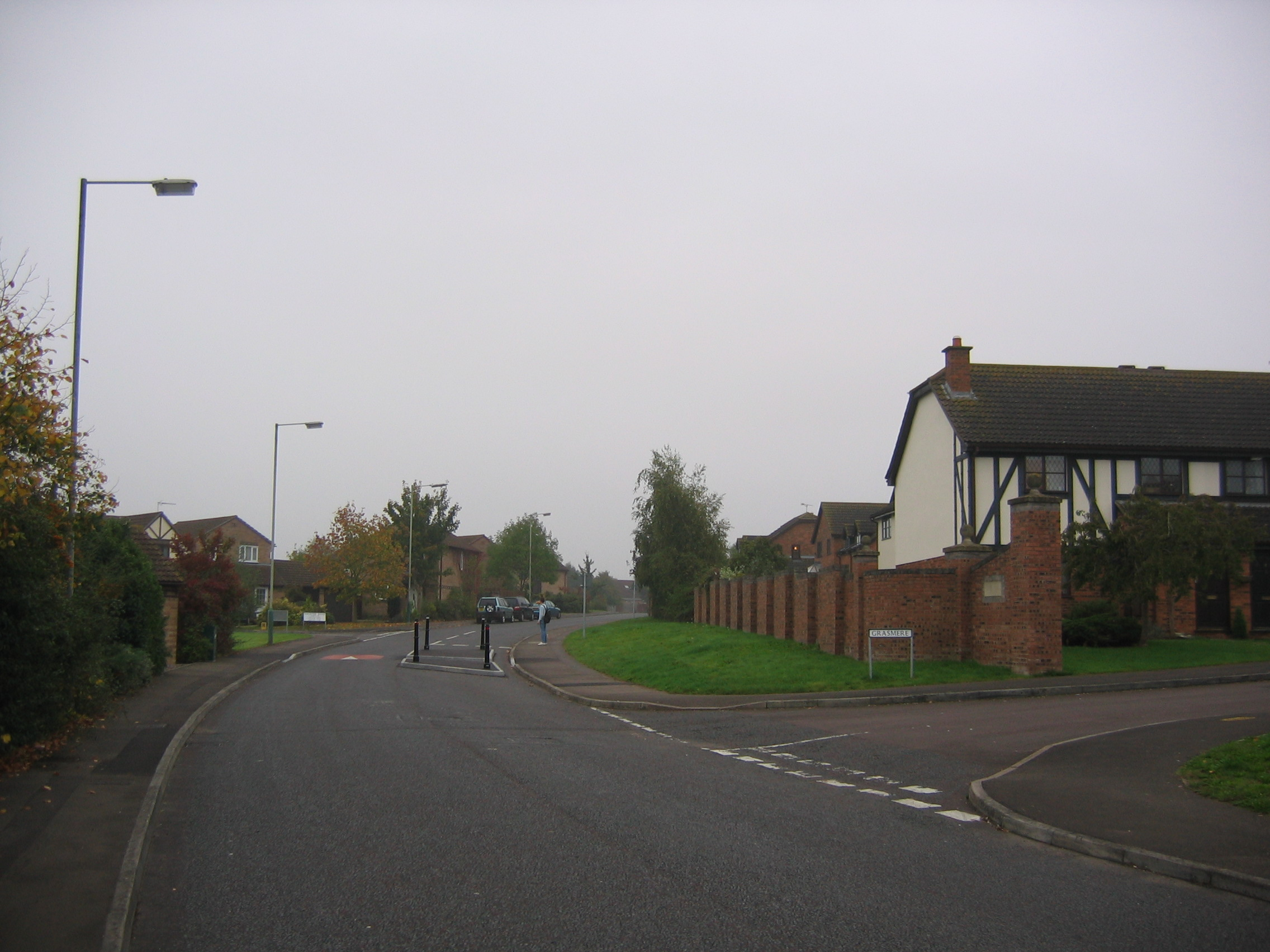
- Falcon Way

- Location within Wiltshire
- OS grid reference: ST914621
- Civil parish: Melksham Without
- Unitary authority: Wiltshire
- Ceremonial county: Wiltshire
- Region: South West
- Country: England
- Sovereign state: United Kingdom
- Post town: Melksham
- Postcode district: SN12
- Dialling code: 01225
- Police: Wiltshire
- Fire: Dorset and Wiltshire
- Ambulance: South Western
- UK Parliament: Melksham and Devizes

Bowerhill is a village near Melksham, Wiltshire, England, in the civil parish of Melksham Without. Central Bowerhill is approximately 1.75 miles (2.8 km) south of Melksham town centre.

Bowerhill has a population of approximately 3,000 and was separated from the town of Melksham by a narrow rural buffer or green swathe until 2022, when most of the buffer was obliterated by housing. To the west of Bowerhill's residential area is a commercial area which developed from a former Royal Air Force training school. Melksham's only secondary school, Melksham Oak Community School, is on the north-east edge of Bowerhill.

== History ==
An area south-east of Melksham was anciently the tithing of Woolamore, which may have been a property of Amesbury priory.

Bowerhill was a rural area until early in 1940, when work began on a new RAF station. In July the RAF School of Instrument Training moved here from Cranwell and later a branch of the RAF Armament School also moved here. In the following years other courses were run and in 1942 the Armament School moved out and was replaced by the RAF Electrical School from Hereford. Towards the end of the Second World War a large number of Royal Naval Air Service mechanics were trained here and many transport drivers also received instruction. After the war, RAF Melksham resumed its Electrical and Instrument courses; in 1961 the No.12 School of Technical Training was present. The site continued in educational use until the early 1970s.

After the departure of the RAF, the site saw a mixture of industrial, commercial and residential use, with much development in the 1980s. Its history is remembered in the area's street names, many of which are taken from historical aircraft. These include Falcon Way, Lancaster Road and Fulmar Close. The local pub is called The Pilot, and was formerly named The Harrier.

The commercial area is home to several small business, the Wiltshire Gymnastics Centre and a household recycling centre. The German engineering company Knorr-Bremse Rail Systems (formerly Westinghouse Brakes Limited, part of Westinghouse Brake and Signal Co. Ltd) established large modern offices in Bowerhill in 2005, and in 2015 Herman Miller, American office furniture manufacturer, opened a factory and offices in a building designed by Sir Nicholas Grimshaw.

The village was bounded to the south by the GWR's Devizes Branch Line until its closure in 1966. In the first decade of the 21st century, residential developments such as Hunter's Meadow increased Bowerhill's population.

== Notable buildings ==
The house known as Woolmore Manor is behind a tall hedge on the north side of the A365 Bath Road, next to Woolmore (or Woolamore) farm. It was built in 1631 in red brick for George Hulbert, citizen and vintner of London, and has four gabled roofs behind its three-bay front, forming a square plan. There is a large Tudor fireplace, and two more upstairs. The house is Grade II* listed.

== Amenities ==
Bowerhill has a primary school and a village hall. Bowerhill sports field (5.34 hectares) was part of the RAF training school. Melksham's secondary school, Melksham Oak, is in Bowerhill on the other side of the A365 Melksham-Seend road.
