= A350 road =

Road in England

A350

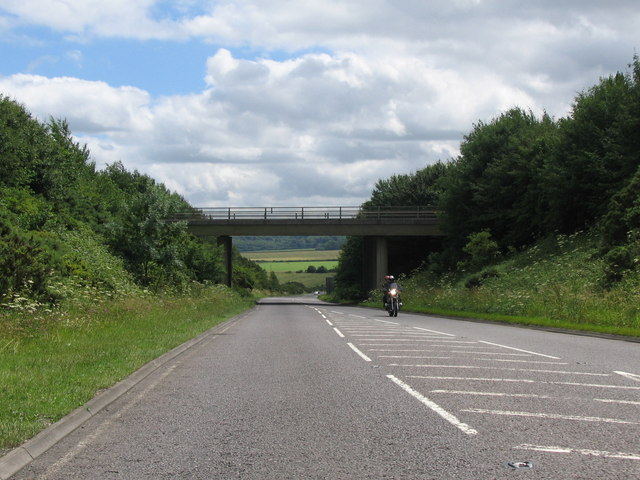
- The A350 near Hindon, Wiltshire; the overbridge carries the A303 road

Route information
- Length: 70.1 mi (112.8 km)

Major junctions
- north end: M4; 51.5148°N 2.1217°W
- A429 A420; A4 A365 A3102 A361 A363 A3098; A36 A362 A303; A30 A357 A354; A31; A35 A349 A3049
- south end: A35; 50.74034°N 2.01756°W

Location
- Country: United Kingdom
- Primary destinations: Chippenham; Trowbridge; Warminster; Shaftesbury; Blandford Forum; Poole; Bournemouth

Road network
- Roads in the United Kingdom; Motorways; A and B road zones

The A350 is a north–south primary route in southern England, that runs from the M4 motorway in Wiltshire to Poole in Dorset.

== Route ==
Starting at junction 17 of the M4 motorway north of Chippenham, the first three miles are a dual carriageway to the northern outskirts of Chippenham, where a partly light-controlled roundabout splits traffic between the bypass section and the road into the town centre. The Chippenham bypass is punctuated by six more roundabouts, the last being at the Lackham College. In so doing it crosses the A420 to Bristol and the A4 for Bath to the West and Calne to the East.

It then goes past the small village of Lacock before reaching Melksham four miles later. The road then follows the Semington bypass, opened in 2004, to Westbury, crossing the A361 between Trowbridge and Devizes. This section of the road has two light-controlled junctions to connect the road to outlying areas of Trowbridge before reaching the Yarnbrook roundabout. This section is approximately 5 miles long.

The road takes a winding route through the town centre of Westbury before heading towards Warminster, where it splits from its original route at a light-controlled junction along the Warminster bypass. Where the bypass meets the A36 Bath to Salisbury road, they merge for about 3 miles, before the A350 continues south towards Shaftesbury, passing through Crockerton Green and Longbridge Deverill and beneath the A303.

The section between Shaftesbury and Blandford Forum is almost completely unimproved and in at least one location the road is not wide enough to allow two lorries to pass safely, with the remainder of this section being narrow with several dangerous blind corners, that could be described as resembling almost B-Road status. The road passes through the hamlet of Cann and the villages of Compton Abbas, Fontmell Magna, Sutton Waldron, Iwerne Minster and Stourpaine before reaching Blandford Forum.

At Blandford Forum is another bypass built to ease town centre traffic where the A350 crossed and merged with the A354. The bypass still merges the two roads for a short stretch. There are four roundabouts on this section, the last of which sees the two roads go their separate ways. The road then passes through the villages of Charlton Marshall, Spetisbury and Sturminster Marshall before crossing the A31 via a roundabout.

Before reaching Poole, the road joins the A35 at a grade separated junction before separating again at a roundabout at the north east end of Holes Bay. This section is a dual carriageway as far as Poole Railway Station. The final section crosses the Black Water Channel by the Poole Bridge before terminating at the roundabout on New Harbour Road where the Ferry Port is located.

== History ==
When first designated in 1922, the A350 ran only from Warminster to Poole. By 1948 the road had been extended north from Warminster to Chippenham on the former routes of the A363 and the A364. In the 1990s the road was extended north from Chippenham to the M4 motorway by renumbering the A429.

The Chippenham bypass was built in the 1990s as a single carriageway and was designed for future widening to dual carriageway. Work to dual the section between Chippenham Golf Club, where the original dual carriageway from the M4 motorway narrowed, to the Badger roundabout was completed in 2014, and the section from Brook roundabout to Bumper's Farm roundabout, the junction with the A420 Bristol Road, was completed in 2016. The remaining sections, as far south as the junction with the A4 Bath Road, were completed in the following years.

In 2004, the route between Melksham and Semington was replaced by a new road that bypassed Semington and, like the Chippenham bypass, was designed to be dualled at a future date. The New Semington Aqueduct carries the Kennet and Avon Canal over this section.

In December 2023, Wiltshire Council awarded a £20.7 million contract for dualling the remaining sections of the A350 Chippenham bypass. Preparatory works began in January 2024 and were completed in mid-March. Construction is expected to start in May 2024 and continue until November 2025.

== Proposed developments ==
=== Westbury ===
A controversial £33 million bypass around Westbury was initially proposed in 1997, with public consultation and a selection of route options proposed in 1999. Wiltshire County Council's Environment and Transport Committee selected the Eastern Route (though it was the least popular) as the 'preferred route' in 2001, because the Council said that it offered the best and lowest cost way of relieving traffic congestion in the town centre. The council submitted an initial planning application during 2005. The council said that the government indicated that it was in favour of the project in 2006. The Council presented a further planning application in 2007.

The council's selected route would pass to the east of the town. The council expected it to reduce traffic through Westbury, create more space for cyclists and pedestrians, and improve journey time reliability on the A350 by two minutes. It would also provide a new access road to the West Wilts Trading Estate, though not to the other Westbury trading estates, or the railway station or the designated Future Intermodal Freight Terminal. The scheme, would, by the council's own forecasts, cause increased heavy goods vehicle flow through other West Wiltshire communities, such as Southwick, which already have over twice the HGVs of Westbury. The eastern bypass route is supported by the 'Westbury Bypass Now' group.

The council's route, which runs close to the Westbury White Horse, two Sites of Special Scientific Interest, near Salisbury Plain and through a Special Landscape Area, is not included in the Regional Transport Priority for South West England. The route has been described as 'highly intrusive' by the council's landscape officer. It attracted opposition from various environmental and local groups including the White Horse Alliance, the Campaign to Protect Rural England, Woodland Trust, Friends of the Earth, Campaign for Better Transport and Wiltshire Wildlife Trust.

The scheme was 'called in' in 2007. An Inquiry into the scheme was held in July 2008. It was adjourned until September–October after objectors noticed that some figures for lorry counts were out by 100%. The inquiry ended in the autumn of 2008. The decision was with John Denham the Secretary of State for Communities and Local Government. The planning inspectors recommended refusal of planning permission for Wiltshire Council's eastern Westbury bypass scheme.

=== Trowbridge ===
A scheme has been proposed since 2015 to improve the A350 West Ashton/Yarnbrook junction to ease traffic flows at a noted bottleneck. This will involve the construction of a new relief road to replace the section north of the junction. Three new roundabouts are also proposed, to connect with the A363 Westbury Road, a link to Yarnbrook village and one at the existing West Ashton Road.

=== Melksham ===
In 2020, the government said £135m could be available to bypass Beanacre, north of Melksham, and provide a new route east of the town. Wiltshire Council consulted with the public in late 2020 and early 2021 on a number of options, including short and long routes to the east and west of the town, taking into account local traffic and east–west movements as well as the north–south primary route.

In June 2021, Wiltshire Council's cabinet resolved to progress an eastern route that starts to the north of Beanacre and meets the A3102 and A365 before rejoining the current A350 south of the town, beyond Bowerhill. A shortlist of options around this route will again be subject to public consultation.

=== Future status ===
The A350 from the M4 to Warminster is designated as part of the 'major road network', a network of local authority 'A' roads which are not classed as 'strategic' but are locally or regionally important. Since 2020, Highways England (now National Highways) has been developing a South Coast to M4 route strategy. The current preferred route is the A36 to Bath, then the A46 to the M4. Due to the traffic situation in Bath, Highways England may propose de-listing the current route and adopting the A350 instead; this may release funding for further works between Poole and the M4.

== Gallery ==
Image gallery
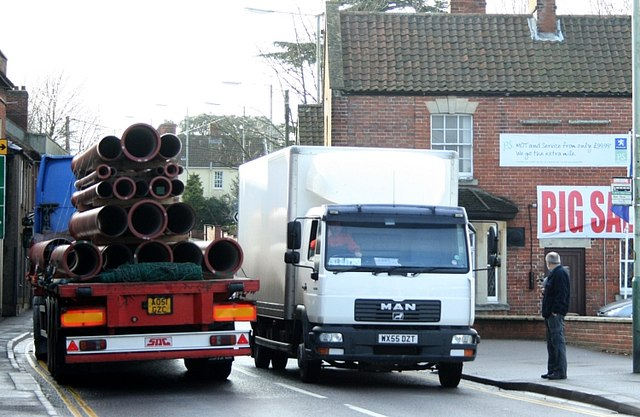
Traffic in Westbury

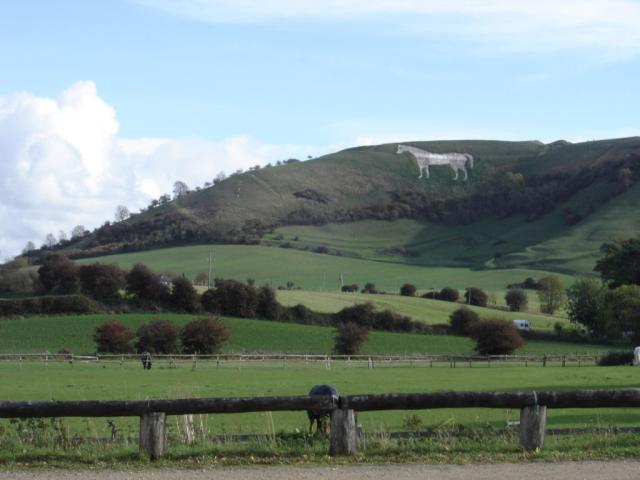
View of the Westbury White Horse from the proposed route

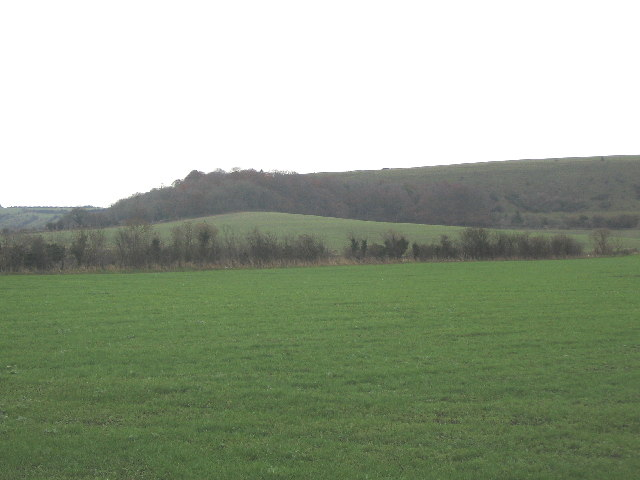
View of southern section of bypass route

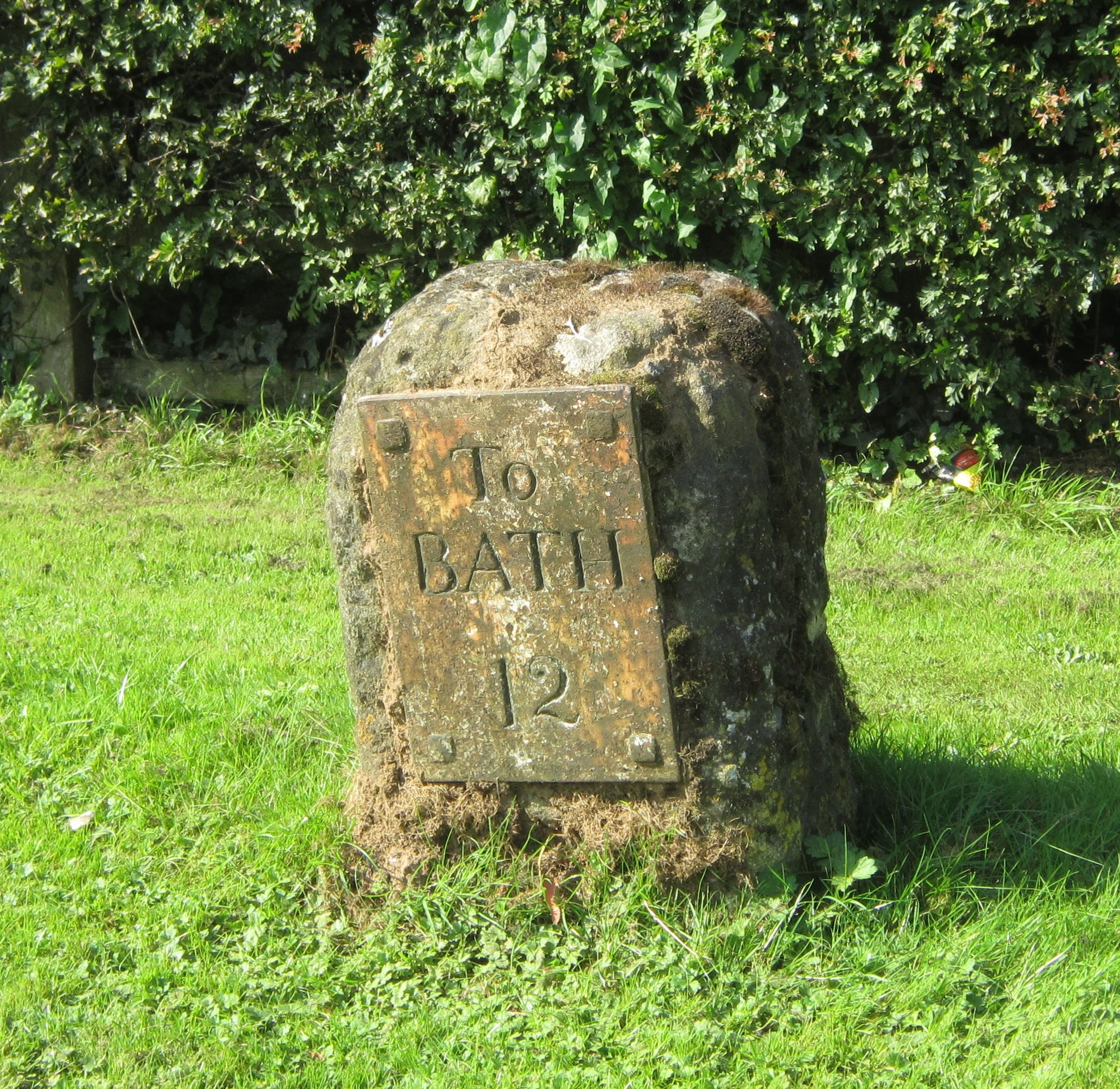
Early 19th century milestone near Lacock, stating "To BATH 12"
