= Melksham and Devizes =

UK Parliament constituency (since 2024)

- County constituency for the House of Commons
- Boundary of Melksham and Devizes in South West England
- County: Wiltshire
- Electorate: 71,823 (2023)
- Major settlements: Bradford-on-Avon, Devizes, Melksham

Current constituency
- Created: 2024
- Member of Parliament: Brian Mathew (Liberal Democrats)
- Seats: One
- Created from: Chippenham, Devizes, North Wiltshire

Melksham and Devizes is a constituency of the House of Commons in the UK Parliament. Further to the completion of the 2023 Periodic Review of Westminster constituencies, it was first contested at the 2024 general election, when it was won by Brian Mathew of the Liberal Democrats. He defeated Conservative former cabinet minister Michelle Donelan, who had been MP for Chippenham from 2015 to 2024.

== Constituency profile ==
Melksham and Devizes is a constituency in Wiltshire. It is named after its two largest towns, Melksham and Devizes, which each have populations of around 20,000. Other settlements in the constituency include the town of Bradford-on-Avon and the villages of Bowerhill and Box.

The constituency is mostly rural with market towns and many small villages. Melksham and Devizes are historic towns with traditional rural industries like brewing and the trade of wool and cereal grains. Bradford-on-Avon contains many historic buildings and is popular with tourists due to its location close to the Cotswolds. The constituency is generally affluent with low levels of deprivation, especially so in the west around Bradford-on-Avon. House prices across the constituency are generally higher than the regional and national averages.

There is a large retiree population in the constituency, giving it a high average age. Residents have average levels of education and above-average rates of income and homeownership. The child poverty rate is low and few residents are unemployed, with a high proportion working in the manufacturing and agriculture sectors. White people made up 96% of the population at the 2021 census.

At the local unitary authority, most of the constituency is represented by Liberal Democrats, who were elected in the towns and the more affluent rural west. Some Conservative councillors were elected in the rural east. An estimated 52% of voters in the constituency supported leaving the European Union in the 2016 referendum, identical to the nationwide figure.

== Boundaries ==
Map of boundaries from 2024

The constituency is composed of the following electoral districts of Wiltshire (as they existed on 4 May 2021):

- Bowerhill; Box & Colerne; Bradford-on-Avon North; Bradford-on-Avon South; Bromham, Rowde & Roundway; Calne South; Devizes East; Devizes North; Devizes Rural West; Devizes South; Holt; Melksham East; Melksham Forest; Melksham South; Melksham Without North & Shurnhold; Melksham Without West & Rural; The Lavingtons; Urchfont & Bishops Cannings; Winsley & Westwood.

It comprises the following areas:

- The towns of Melksham and Bradford-on-Avon, transferred from Chippenham
- The town of Devizes, transferred from the constituency of Devizes (the majority of which was incorporated into the new constituency of East Wiltshire)
- Rural parishes east of Trowbridge, transferred from South West Wiltshire
- The wards of Box and Colerne, and Calne South, transferred from the abolished North Wiltshire constituency

== Elections ==
=== Elections in the 2020s ===
General election 2024: Melksham and Devizes
Party	Candidate	Votes	%	±%
Liberal Democrats	Brian Mathew	20,031	39.1	+11.8
Conservative	Michelle Donelan	17,630	34.4	−23.4
Reform	Malcolm Cupis	6,726	13.1	N/A
Labour	Kerry Postlewhite	4,587	9.0	−3.0
Green	Catherine Read	2,229	4.4	+1.4
Majority		2,401	4.7	N/A
Turnout		51,203	71.1	−6.5
Registered electors		71,999		
Liberal Democrats gain from Conservative		Swing	+17.7	

=== Elections in the 2010s ===
2019 notional result
Party	Vote	%
Conservative	32,227	57.8
Liberal Democrats	15,199	27.3
Labour	6,686	12.0
Green	1,652	3.0
Turnout	55,764	77.6
Electorate	71,823	
