= Bradford Hundred =

Hundreds of Wiltshire in 1832

Bradford Hundred was a judicial and taxation subdivision of the English county of Wiltshire that existed from the about the 8th century to the 19th century.

The hundred contained the parishes of Bradford-on-Avon, Broughton Gifford, Great Chalfield, Holt, Monkton Fairleigh and Wingfield.

The hundred was granted to Shaftesbury Abbey, in Dorset, by King Ethelred and consisted of 99 hides at the time of Domesday in 1086. It was held by the Abbey until the dissolution.
