= Holt, Wiltshire =

Village in Wiltshire, England

Coordinates: 51.357°N 2.197°W

Holt
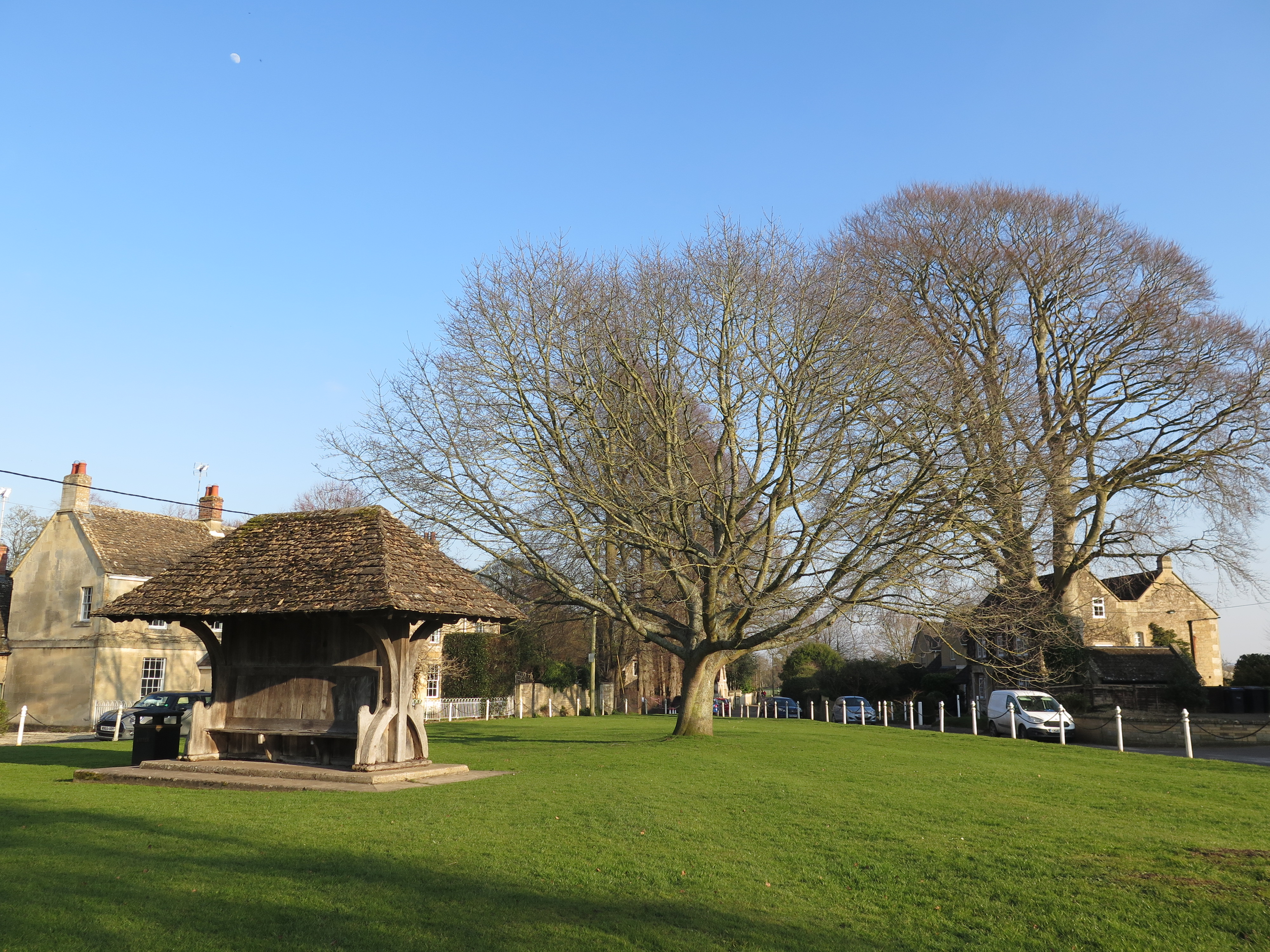
- Ham Green, Holt, Wiltshire

- Location within Wiltshire
- Population: 1,757 (in 2011)
- OS grid reference: ST864620
  - London: 100 mi (160 km)
- Civil parish: Holt
- Unitary authority: Wiltshire
- Ceremonial county: Wiltshire
- Region: South West
- Country: England
- Sovereign state: United Kingdom
- Post town: Trowbridge
- Postcode district: BA14
- Dialling code: 01225
- Police: Wiltshire
- Fire: Dorset and Wiltshire
- Ambulance: South Western
- UK Parliament: Melksham and Devizes
- Website: Parish Council

Holt is a village and civil parish in the west of Wiltshire, England, about 2.5 miles (4 km) northeast of Bradford-on-Avon and 3 miles (5 km) southwest of Melksham.

== Geography ==
The village lies on clays of the Kellaways Formation (part of what is known as Oxford Clay), just above the alluvium of the River Avon and on a terrace of Ice Age gravel. A small persistent stream runs through it approximately northwest to southeast, from the dip slope of the Cotswolds to join the river near the southern parish boundary.

The civil parish of Holt was established in 1894 and includes the village, manor, the hamlet of Forewoods Common, the Great Bradford Wood, and numerous farms beyond the village boundary. The parish boundaries were last modified in 1934 and encompass 786 hectares of land which rises from about 30 metres above sea level to a maximum of 75 metres in the most northerly parts of the parish. Holt parish is bounded in the north by those of Atworth (including Great Chalfield) and Broughton Gifford, to the east by Hilperton (including the hamlet of Whaddon), to the west by Bradford on Avon and South Wraxall (including the hamlet of Bradford Leigh), and to the south by Staverton and the county town of Trowbridge.

The River Avon forms much of the southern parish boundary. The extreme southern tip of the parish is crossed by the Kennet and Avon Canal. The extant railway lines between Trowbridge and Bradford, and Trowbridge and Chippenham also cross the parish in the western and eastern margins, respectively.

The nucleus of the village lies on the Bradford-on-Avon to Melksham road, the B3107, which bisects the village roughly south-west to north-east. This road was turnpiked in 1762 as the coach road connecting Bradford on Avon, via Melksham, to the village of Lacock where it met the coach road from London to Bath.

The hamlet of Forewoods Common lies approximately midway between Holt and Bradford-on-Avon on the B3107. It is at a crossroads with the B3105 that connects the A363 Bradford to Bath road via Bradford Leigh and the hamlet of Woolley Green, to Staverton, Hilperton and Trowbridge. The B3105 bridges the River Avon on the parish boundary at Staverton Mill, formerly a woollen mill, later a condensed milk factory owned by Nestlé, and today a cereal factory operated by Cereal Partners Worldwide.

The B3106 forms an alternative route that connects Holt to Staverton, meeting the B3105 at a junction before the bridge at Staverton Mill. There is also road access from Holt to Great Chalfield, Broughton Gifford, Bradford Leigh, and South Wraxall.

The manor of Holt lies a little way north of the village nucleus, having been established in the 13th century. The Grade I listed Great Chalfield Manor is nearby.

The Great Bradford Wood forms much of the bulk of the southern dog-leg of the parish. The wood was formerly part of The Hall Estate, owned by the inventor and bicycle designer Alex Moulton. Within the wood is a sub-rectangular enclosure, defined by an inner bank, ditch and outer bank, on a small rise of Oxford clay above the River Avon, which is considered to date to the late-prehistoric period, most likely between the Late-Bronze and Early-Iron Age. The enclosure is a Scheduled Ancient Monument.

== History ==
Although there are no major prehistoric or Neolithic finds in the parish, there is evidence to suggest that human habitation has persisted in Holt since the Bronze and Iron Ages. Worked flints from the Neolithic period have been found in gravel pits on the Avon floodplain on the southern edge of the parish and there is later evidence of a Roman farm on the river gravels.

From about 1001 AD, Holt was a tithing in the manor of Bradford, given by Æthelred the Unready to the Abbess of Shaftesbury by a charter now in the British Museum where it is probably the place referred to as Wrindesholt. The name has various interpretations; Holt is generally regarded as the Old English word for 'wood' and Wrindesholt as 'boundary wood', 'cleared wood', or literally 'Wrinda's wood'. There are no explicit references to Holt in the Domesday Book. However, by the middle of the twelfth century, records indicate that Holt was home to 27 recorded individuals, including a priest. The font in the parish church is extant from this period, although the rest of the original church fabric has been lost.

Holt remained in the possession of Shaftesbury Abbey until somewhen between 1242 and 1252, when the manor was granted to the de Holt family with Robert de Holt being given 'free warren in the demesne lands of his manor'. He was also granted a license to hold a fair at the manor each Saint Catherine's Day (25 November). The manor's deer park, established by 1316, is thought to have encompassed much of the modern village.

In 1344, the manor was conveyed to William Edington, later Bishop of Winchester and Lord Chancellor of England. The extant parish church tower dates from this period. Poll tax records from 1377 record 44 people over the age of 14 paying poll tax, and provides an estimate of the population of Holt at this time of between 72–99 people. The number of tax-payers is low considering that at least 32 houses are also recorded. Wealthier inhabitants are assumed to have avoided paying the tax.

Ownership of the manor changed again in 1426, passing to the Lisle family, in whose possession it would be held for the next 320 years.

=== Holt Spa ===
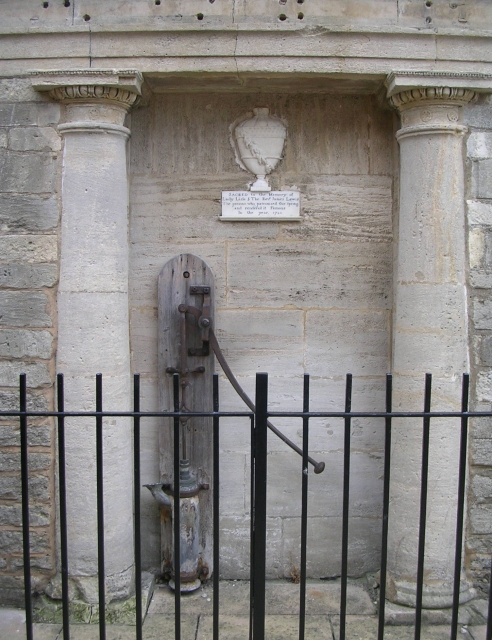
The preserved pump, Holt Spa, Holt, Wiltshire

When a mineral water spring was discovered in 1688 at what would become known as Holt Spa, Lady Lisle would be instrumental in the promotion of the waters to high society. At least four wells – The Old, The New, The Great Nose, and Harris's – were sunk, and under the guidance of the local nobility and clergy, the operation became a commercial enterprise from 1723. The proprietor, Henry Eyre, claimed in 1731 that the waters had the ability to cure King’s Evil, ulcers, leprosy, scrophula, piles, itching of the skin, colic, giddiness of the head and other ailments. Eyre was successfully exporting bottled spa water to London.

By the 1780s, a resort had been established in Holt: the Spa House provided treatments, and the Great House offered lodgings for guests who took the waters. Holt faced competition from the much more popular spa at Bath but is said to have been frequented by the lesser gentry and to have enjoyed a 'summer season', with numerous Londoners entering the parish burial registers in the late 18th century providing some testament to its popularity.

By 1790, the heyday of the spa resort was over. Holt Waters remained for sale until 1815; around that time mineral springs were discovered nearby at Melksham, and another small spa was developed there.

The Spa House was incorporated into a bedding factory on the site, and later demolished. A pair of Tuscan columns from the Spa House entrance and a well pump were saved from demolition and incorporated in the new factory building. This memorial, together with a marble tablet dedicated to Lady Lisle and the Reverend John Lewis, whose patronage made the wells famous from 1720, are all that remain of the spa. Holt Water was analysed in 1933 and found to be very cloudy and quite unsuitable for drinking.

The Great House became a short-lived girls' school for day students and boarders, then from 1794 a boys' boarding school. By 1821, the building had been divided into tenements with seventeen families living there. In 1868 it was advertised for sale and subsequently became part of Beaven's leather dressing factory. It reverted to tenements and was demolished in 1957 as unsafe and incapable of economic repair. The site is now home to a light industrial estate.

=== Industrial Holt ===
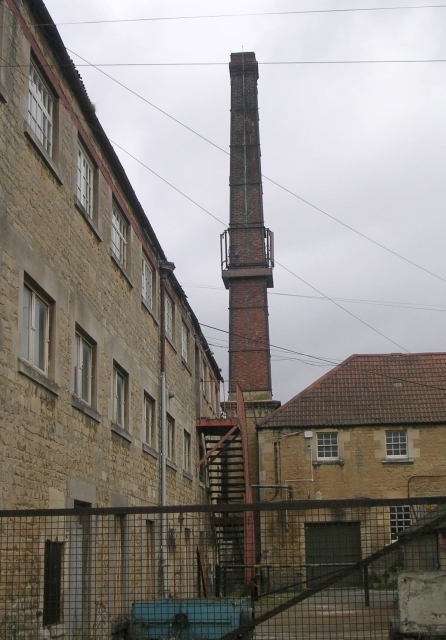
The Beavens' tannery chimney, Holt, Wiltshire

From the fourteenth century, cloth-making was a major aspect of the economy of the village and the surrounding area. Of particular note was the woollen mill in nearby Staverton. By the seventeenth century, there were numerous weavers in Holt. In 1703, the clothier John Phelps bought property and opened a dye-works and workshops at what is now The Courts. This had expanded under new ownership by the end of the eighteenth century to become a five-story factory with a large water wheel and steam engine. The factory expanded further but was a casualty of the collapse of the English woollen industry in the nineteenth century and was demolished in 1890.

Members of the Beaven family started a leather dressing factory at Holt in the 1770s. They had previously been woolstaplers and fellmongers. The company, later called J. & T. Beaven Ltd, also processed wool, manufactured gloves, and processed sheepskins into chamois leather until sometime after 1970. During the Second World War, the Beavens held contracts to produce linings for flying jackets and gloves for the RAF. Since 1995, the company has existed as an Anglo-European wholesaler of car care products, including chamois leather, but manufacturing in Holt ended in 1990. The factory site has been redeveloped for mixed residential and commercial use.

In the 1830s, the Sawtell family, feather merchants by trade, established a bedding factory in the village, on the site of the old spa. For the next 150 years, the company produced bedding, bedsteads, and feathers for commercial use. Sawtells was wound up in the 1990s, and the factory site was used for a while as industrial premises before being demolished and redeveloped for housing.

=== Holt and the railway ===
The success of both Beavens and Sawtells became reliant on their use of the railway to export their products. In 1848, the Wilts, Somerset and Weymouth Railway Company opened their line southward from Thingley Junction near Chippenham, at first only as far as Westbury. The line passed the village to the southeast but no local station was provided. The company sold its line to the Great Western Railway (GWR) in 1850. In 1857 the GWR completed the Devizes branch line, which met the earlier line to the east of the village. By 1861 there was a single-platform interchange at the junction to allow passengers to transfer between main line and branch line trains.

Holt Junction station opened to passengers in 1874, although the only access from the village was by footpath; in 1877 a road connection was made and a goods shed was added, from which the wares of Beavens and Sawtells were exported. The Beeching report saw the goods yard closed in 1963. The Devizes branch and the village station were closed in 1966 and subsequently demolished. The line between Bradford Junction and Thingley Junction was singled, and the junction curve allowing trains from Bradford-on-Avon to run towards Holt, removed.

== Local government ==
Holt is a civil parish with an elected parish council. It is in the area of Wiltshire Council, a unitary authority, which is responsible for most local government functions.

Holt formed part of the ancient hundred of Bradford, which was divided into civil parishes in 1894. A boundary review of 1934 transferred part of the abolished parish of Bradford Without to Holt.

== Amenities ==
Holt has a village shop, which since 2014 has also housed the post office.

There were once five pubs and a brewery in Holt. Today, two remain: The Tollgate Inn and The Old Ham Tree. A third pub, The Three Lions, said to have been established before 1705, closed in the 1990s.

Local children attend Holt Voluntary Controlled Primary School. The school was the result of the merger of the village's Church of England and Congregational schools in the 1960s.

The village has a variety of sports clubs including bowls, netball, and tennis. Holt Football Club is the oldest club in Wiltshire, having been established in 1864. The clubs make use of playing fields, established upon the enclosure of the last commons in Holt in 1867.

Glove Factory Studios, opened in 2008 within part of the former Beavens' leather factory, is a workspace hub for start-ups, creative entrepreneurs and independent professionals.

== Religious sites ==
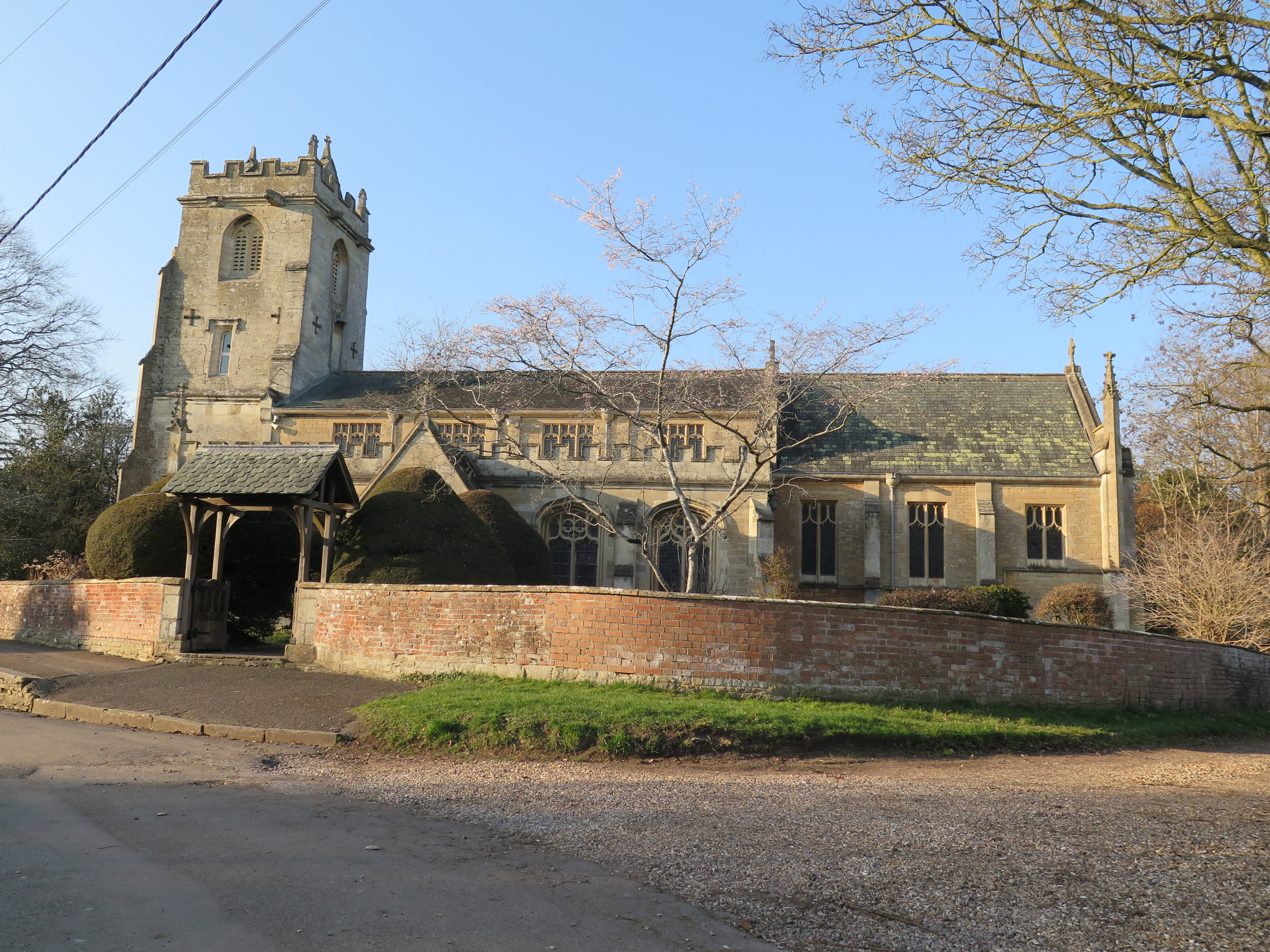
St Katharine's Church

There was a chapel at Holt in the 12th century, later annexed to the vicarage of Bradford. The Church of England parish church of St Katharine is Grade II* listed. It was rebuilt in 1891 to designs by the Gothic Revival architect C.E. Ponting of Marlborough; the Decorated Gothic south porch and Perpendicular Gothic west tower survive from the earlier mediaeval parish church.

The font bowl is from the 12th century. The tower has six bells, one from the 15th century and the others recast in 1925. Today the church is part of the benefice of Broughton Gifford, Great Chalfield and Holt.

A small non-conformist chapel was built in 1813 and enlarged in 1846, creating a two-storey building with a schoolroom on the ground floor. From 1859 this was known as the Congregational church. A new larger building, in stone and with a tower, was begun in 1880 on the same site; the older chapel continued in use as a school until 1962 and later became a church hall. The church became a United Reformed Church on the foundation of that organisation in 1972.

== Landmarks ==
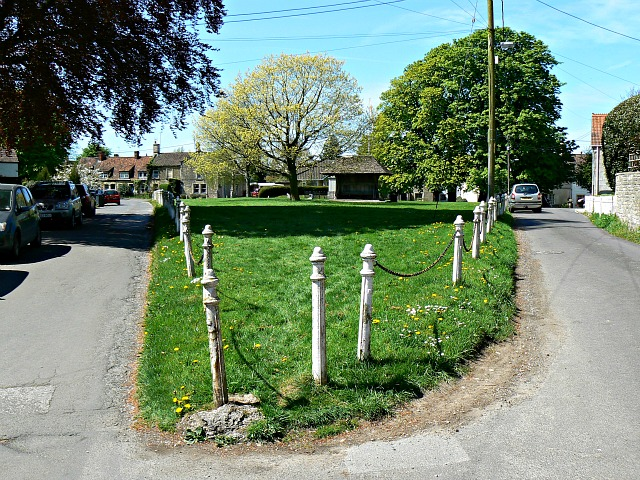
The village green, Holt

The former tannery in the northwest of Holt village has a tall, four-sided chimney. The site includes an 18th-century cottage which was used as factory offices.

There is an obelisk war memorial on the village green.

Holt Manor is a Grade II listed manor house that dates to the 17th century, although the manor estate dates back to the 12th century when it was owned by Shaftesbury Abbey and farmed by the De Holte family. It was later held by the Baron St Amend, and then the de Lisle family until it was sold to Simon Burton, Royal Physician in Ordinary to the King, in the 1740s. In the 19th century the manor was the seat of Thomas Barton Watkin Forster, and the painter Mary Forster was raised there. Later occupants have included Giles Clarke, the chairman of the England and Wales Cricket Board.

In the centre of the village is The Courts, a Grade II* listed country house from the early 18th century. The Courts Garden is an example of early 20th-century English garden style, with an arboretum, working vegetable garden and orchard. Other features in The Courts include the Sundial Lawn, another disused village pump and a folly temple. The house and garden are owned by the National Trust.

== Notable people ==
- John Lewis (1685–1761), an antiquarian and diarist, Rector of Great Chalfield from 1713 to 1761, was also curate of Holt and lived most of his life there, playing an active part in the development of a mineral water industry.
- Simon Burton (c. 1690–1744) – Royal Physician in Ordinary to the King, owned the manor of Holt.
- Esther Lewis (1716–1794) – poet, daughter of the Rev John Lewis of Holt (see above), lived there until about 1760.
- Mary Forster (1853–1885) – watercolourist, born at Holt Manor.
- Richard Learoyd (born 1966) – contemporary artist and photographer, current resident of Holt.
- Henry Arundell (born 2002) – England rugby union international, and player for London Irish and Racing 92.
- Giles Clarke (born 1953) – chairman of the England and Wales Cricket Board, formerly owned Holt Manor.
- Duncan Hames (born 1977) – Liberal Democrat MP for Chippenham (2010 to 2015), resident of the village during his time in office.
- Vidal Sassoon (1928–2012) – celebrated hairstylist, as a boy was evacuated to Holt from London in World War Two.

== Sources ==
- Pevsner, Nikolaus; Cherry, Bridget (revision) (1975). The Buildings of England: Wiltshire. Harmondsworth: Penguin Books. pp. 272–273. ISBN 0140710264.
- Chettle, H.F.; Powell, W.R.; Spalding, P.A.; Timlott, P.M. (1953). "Parishes: Bradford-on-Avon". In Pugh, R.B.; Crittall, Elizabeth (eds.). A History of the County of Wiltshire: Volume 7. London: Victoria County History. pp. 4–51.
- Jones, Roger (2022). Holt Wiltshire: An Industrial Village. Bradford on Avon: Ex Libris Press.
- Holt Magazine Editorial Board (1971). The Story of Holt No. 1 Holt Spa. Holt, Wiltshire: Holt Magazine.
- Holt Magazine Editorial Board (1992). Holt: An Introduction to the Village. Holt, Wiltshire: Holt Magazine.
- Holt Magazine Editorial Board (1995). Holt 1895–1995: The Centenary of a Parish: An Introduction to the Village. Holt, Wiltshire: Holt Magazine.
- Holt Magazine Editorial Board (2014). A Guide to Holt. Holt, Wiltshire: Holt Magazine.
- Hurley, Beryl; Tucker, Mary; Newton, Joyce (2003). Holt People in the early 19th century and the story of Holt Spa. Devizes, Wiltshire: Wiltshire Family History Society. ISBN 1898714681.
- Collins, W.G. (1911). "Worked Flints From The River Drift At Holt, Wilts". The Antiquary Magazine. 47 (5): 179–183.
