= R (Gerber) v Wiltshire Council =

UK enterprise law

Gerber v Wiltshire Council
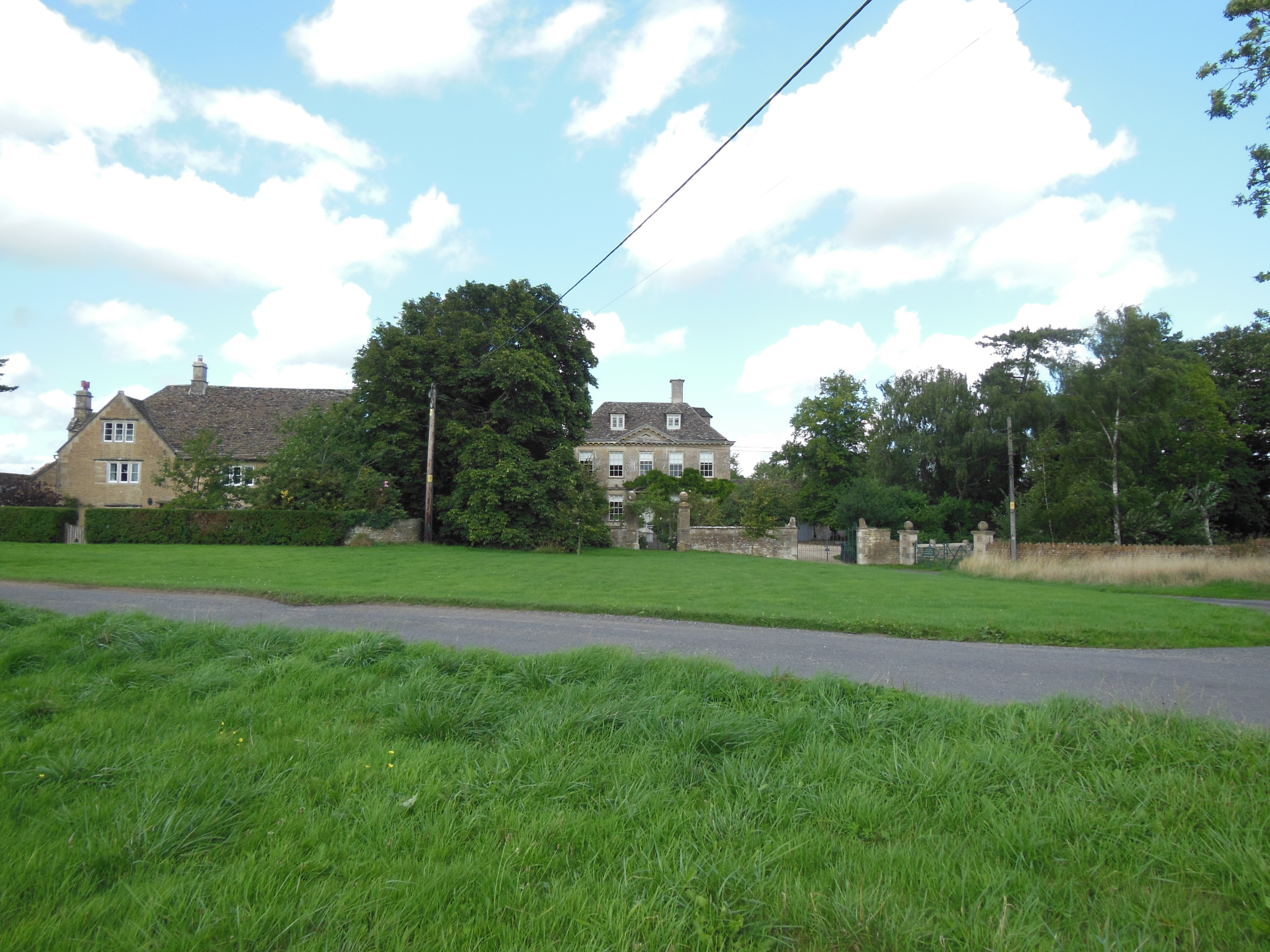
- Gifford Hall, Broughton Gifford
- Court: Court of Appeal
- Citation: [2016] EWCA Civ 84

Keywords
- energy

Gerber v Wiltshire Council [2016] EWCA Civ 84 is a UK enterprise law case relating to planning permission for electricity generation.

== Facts ==
Daniel Gerber, the owner of a Grade II* listed building called Gifford Hall at Broughton Gifford, Wiltshire, claimed that a nearby proposed solar farm should not have been given planning permission. The 22-hectare (54-acre) site (220,000 m^{2}) was agricultural land. Gerber did not become aware of the plan till work started in March 2014; the work was completed in June 2014. Gerber applied for judicial review in October 2014. Dismantling and restoring the land would have required £1.5m in expense, losing £10.5m in total. Gerber claimed he had a legitimate expectation of notification from the council's own Statement of Community Involvement.

Dove J in the High Court quashed planning permission. The owner was entitled to claim despite delay under CPR Pt 54 and the Senior Courts Act 1981 section 31(6).

== Judgment ==
Sales LJ held that the Statement of Community Involvement contained no promise, and generated no legitimate expectation, that a neighbour would be consulted. This error can affect exercise of discretion to extend time to bring a claim. It was inappropriate to extend time for bringing a legal challenge simply because an objector did not notice what was happening, or because of reliance on incorrect legal advice, Finn-Kelcey v Milton Keynes BC. Even if time were extended, major financial detriment would have been suffered by the companies and less harm to the householder's amenity. The balance of factors affecting good administration, including the importance of renewable energy in the national interest, and the need for certainty and finality, meant the order quashing the planning permission had to be set aside.

Lord Dyson MR and Tomlinson LJ agreed.
