= Melksham Hundred =

Hundreds of Wiltshire in 1832

Melksham Hundred was a judicial and taxation subdivision of the English county of Wiltshire that existed from the about the 8th century to the 19th century.

The hundred contained the parishes of Erlestoke, Great Chalfield, Hilperton, Melksham, Poulshot, Trowbridge and Waddon, and the tithing of Bulkington in Keevil parish. Chalfield was transferred to neighbouring Bradford hundred under King John.

The hundred consisted of 84 hides at the time of Domesday in 1086. It was granted to Amice de Clare, Countess of Devon, in 1257 and acquired by the Amesbury Priory before 1281.
