= Beardwell =

Farm and hamlet in Wiltshire, England

Coordinates: 51°22′16″N 2°11′48″W

Beardwell is a farm and small hamlet in the parish of Atworth, Wiltshire, England.

The name appears in the mid-fifteenth century Tropenell Cartulary as Bedewelle, then as Bidwell in 1631, and as Beard Well in a Tithe Award of c. 1840. By comparison with Bidwell in Northamptonshire, the name may be connected with the location of the settlements, as both stand near a Roman road.
