= William Eyre (died 1629) =

English politician

Sir William Eyre (1 January 1556 – 24 August 1629), of Great Chalfield, Wiltshire, was an English politician.

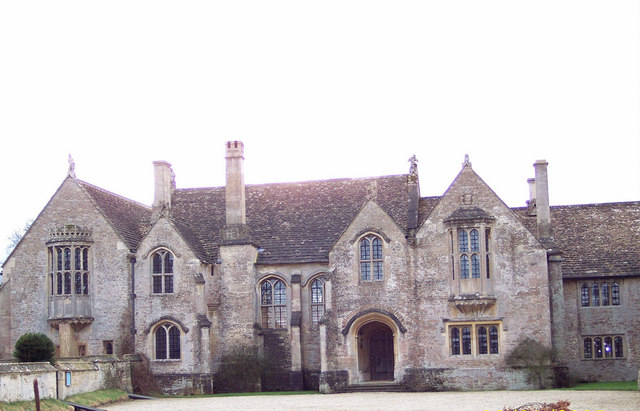
Great Chalfield Manor

He was the only son of John Eyre of Wedhampton, Northcombe, and Great Chalfield. He succeeded his father in 1581 and was knighted in 1592.

He was a member (MP) of the parliament of England for Wiltshire in 1597 and for Heytesbury in 1604.

He was selected High Sheriff of Wiltshire for 1591–92.

He married three times and was succeeded by his son Sir John, courtier and ambassador, who sold Great Chalfield to the Mayor of London.
