= John Eyre (died 1581) =

English politician

John Eyre (died 22 September 1581) was an English politician.

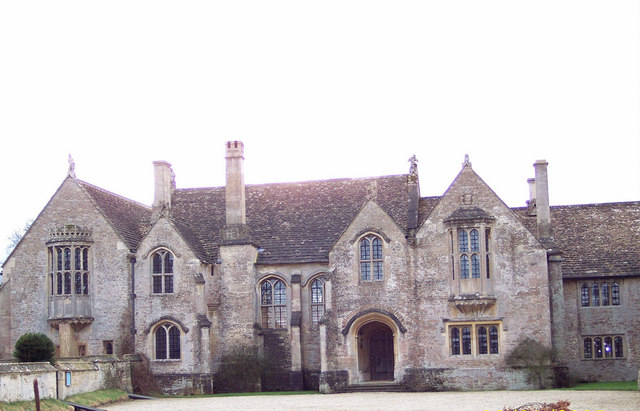
Great Chalfield Manor

He was the eldest son of John Eyre of Wedhampton and Chirton, Wiltshire, who he succeeded in 1554.

He was a justice of the peace for Wiltshire by 1559 and was appointed High Sheriff of Wiltshire for 1565–66. He was a member (MP) of the Parliament of England for Wiltshire in 1563 and Salisbury in 1571.

He married twice: firstly Anne, the daughter of Thomas Tropenell of Great Chalfield, and coheiress of her brother Giles, with whom he had a son and six daughters; and secondly Elizabeth, the daughter of Richard Dauntsey of Potterne. He acquired Great Chalfield manor via his first wife. He was succeeded by his son Sir William, later an MP for Wiltshire.
