= John Lewis (antiquarian and diarist) =

English clergyman and antiquarian

John Lewis (23 August 1685 – 28 October 1761) was an English clergyman of the Church of England, antiquarian, and diarist.

== Early life ==
Born at Kingswood, which was then in Wiltshire, on 23 August 1685, by his own account, Lewis was a son of Ambrose Lewis, of Kingswood, and his wife Martha Hathaway, and was baptized there into the Church of England on 7 September 1685. His father was in business as a dyer and died in April 1697. On 10 April 1701, aged 15, Lewis matriculated at St Edmund Hall, Oxford, and graduated BA in 1704. He was schoolmaster of the grammar school at Tetbury, Gloucestershire, from 1705 to 1712, and in 1708 was married there to Esther Punter, born about 1685. With his wife, he had children, including a daughter, Esther Lewis, later notable as a poet, who was baptized in April 1716. His wife died in 1744.

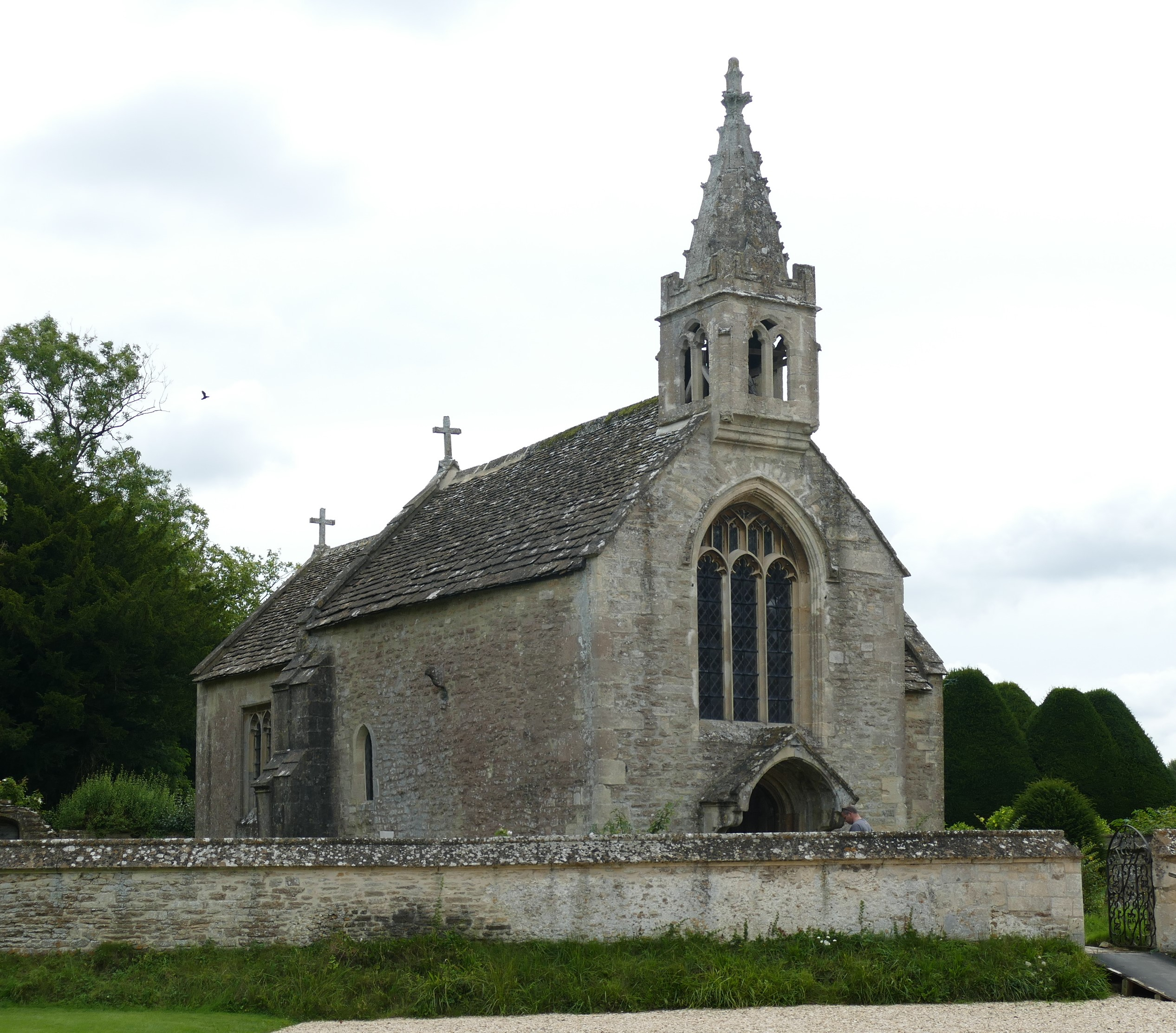
All Saints Church, Great Chalfield, little changed since the time of Lewis

== Career ==
In 1712, William Pierrepont, Earl of Kingston-upon-Hull, the son of the Marquess of Dorchester, appointed Lewis as rector of Great Chalfield, Wiltshire. He was also curate of Holt, Wiltshire, where he lived for 48 years, and of Atworth, which were both chapelries of the large parish of Bradford on Avon. During that time, a mineral waters spa was developed at Holt, and in 1728 Lewis submitted a paper to the Royal Society, "An Account of the several Strata of Earths and Fossils found in sinking the mineral wells at Holt", which appears to show an interest in geology. He notes several strata, including one of yellow clay very like ochre and one of large heavy oval rocks coated in flakes of gypsum. The next year, he submitted a further paper about "the Nature and Virtues of the Holt-waters". The Holt spa, promoted by Lewis and a landowner, Lady Lisle, was well frequented by 1720 and eventually had both a Pump Room, imitating one at Bath, and a Great House at which visitors taking the waters could stay. Little now remains, apart from a cast iron pump and a marble tablet (pictured) which commemorates the efforts of Lisle and Lewis "… who patronized this Spring and rendered it Famous in the year 1720".

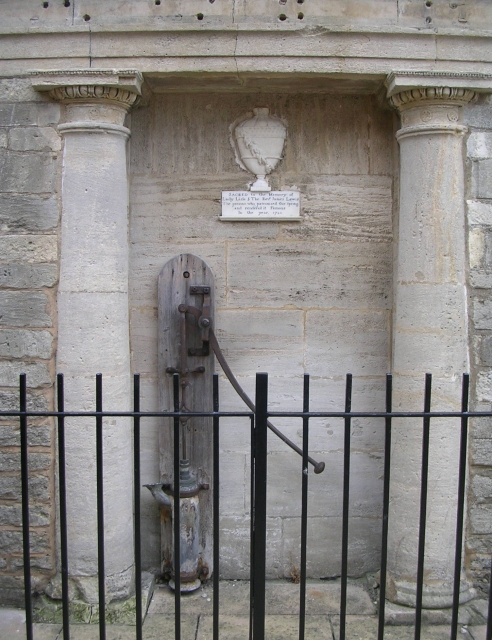
The pump and marble tablet at Holt

In the Michaelmas term of 1720, Lewis took action in the Court of Exchequer against John Golding Sr. about his land in Great Chalfield and the payment of tithes.

Lewis belonged to what he called the Clergy Club of Melksham, a small group of clergymen from that part of Wiltshire who had dinner together once a month. He corresponded with John Wesley (1703–1791), the founder of Methodism, who described Lewis as "one of the most zealous adversaries we have in England" and visited him at Holt in October 1750. Wesley later said he had found Lewis to be "a calm, sensible, venerable old man".

Between 1717 and 1760, Lewis kept a diary, much of which is now at the Bodleian Library. After 1725, the diary became less a detailed account of Lewis's daily life and included more of his reflections. The Wiltshire and Swindon History Centre has a diary volume containing notes on national events and medicinal cures, as well as some other papers. Donald A. Spaeth has studied Lewis's diary from 1718 to 1724, finding that as rector of Great Chalfield and curate of Holt and Atworth, in a single year Lewis "engaged in over 170 social contacts, dining with, visiting and receiving visits from the gentry, tenant farmers, and the clergy". The Bodleian Library also has Lewis's manuscript "A Geographical Description of Wiltshire", which remains unpublished, and a collection of his other papers, described as miscellaneous collections, with sketches and illustrations, including material relating to theology, astronomy, history and medicine.

A notebook of Lewis's is in the Gloucestershire archives. A biography of his daughter notes that Lewis had a particular interest in heraldry.

== Death ==
Lewis died on 28 October 1761, aged 76, and was buried on 3 November by the west door of St Katharine's church, Holt, with a Latin inscription beginning "In spe resurrectionis ad vitem aeternum Reverendus Johannes Lewis hic jacet" (Here lieth the Reverend John Lewis, in hope of resurrection to everlasting life). His will dated 24 September 1760 was proved in the Prerogative Court of Canterbury on 25 November 1761, and there is a copy in the National Archives. In the will he leaves to a grandson, Samuel Lewis, two properties in Kingswood, with orchards and stables; to his daughter Esther, £600, and his library; sums of money to three other grand-children, and five guineas to the poor of Holt, Chalfield, and Atworth. He appoints his daughter as sole executrix and requests the burial of his remains as near as convenient to those of his beloved wife. A biography of his daughter says that Lewis's collection of books was large and valuable.

In October 1762, at Tetbury, Esther Lewis married as his second wife Robert Clark, a widower. He owmed a property in Tetbury where his grandson John Paul Paul built a country house, giving it the name of Highgrove.

== Selected publications ==
- "An Account of the several Strata of Earths and Fossils found in sinking the mineral wells at Holt. By the Rev. Mr. Lewis, Vicar of the Place", Philosophical Transactions of the Royal Society, Vol. 35, No. 403 (1728), pp. 489–491
- "A letter to Dr. Rutty… of the Nature and Virtues of the Holt-waters", Philosophical Transactions of the Royal Society, Vol. 36, No. 408 (1729), pp. 43–45

== Unpublished ==
- Diaries, 1717–1760, most at Bodleian Library, Oxford
- "A Geographical Description of Wiltshire", at Bodleian Library
