= Simon Burton =

Simon Burton may refer to:

- Simon Burton (physician), English physician
- Simon Burton (artist), English painter
- Simon Burton (parliamentary official), British public servant

== See also ==
- Simon Burton-Jones, British Anglican bishop
