= Esther Lewis (poet) =

English poet (1716–1794)

Esther Lewis (1716–1794) was an English poet who published in the fashionable Bath Journal and occasionally in the Gentleman's Magazine. She is also known by her pen name of Sylvia and her later married name of Esther Clark.

== Biography ==
Esther Lewis was the daughter of a clergyman, John Lewis of Holt, Wiltshire. She had a mentor in Samuel Bowden, a physician who treated her through a smallpox infection, also a poet, who was impressed by her talent. Bowden regularly published his own poetry in the Bath Journal and encouraged her to write and publish poems there too. He praised her in a poem of his own entitled To a Young Lady of Holt on her most Ingenious Poems (1749).

Lewis was unmarried when her father made a will on 24 September 1760. In that, he left her £600 (equivalent to £104,752 in 2025) and appointed her as sole executrix of his will, leaving other bequests to four grand-children. He died on 28 October 1761.

After the death of her father, in October 1762, at St Mary’s Church, Tetbury, Esther Lewis married as his second wife Robert Clark, a widower, and from then on lived there. Her husband was younger by some sixteen years and outlived her.

Her best known poem is Advice to a Young Lady Lately Married (1752). Her works were popular and reprinted over the subsequent decades. She arranged a collection of her own works at the prompting of her husband, which were published for charity in 1789, as Poems Moral and Entertaining. This contains a letter to an anonymous lady in London who is thought to be Sarah Fielding, sister of Henry Fielding, whom she had befriended at Bath around 1758.

She died at Tetbury in 1794 and is buried there.
