= Thomas Tropenell =

Thomas Tropenell, sometimes Tropenelle and Tropnell (c. 1405 – 1488), was an English lawyer and landowner in Wiltshire in the west of England.

He acquired large estates, built Great Chalfield Manor, and compiled the Tropenell Cartulary.

== Background ==
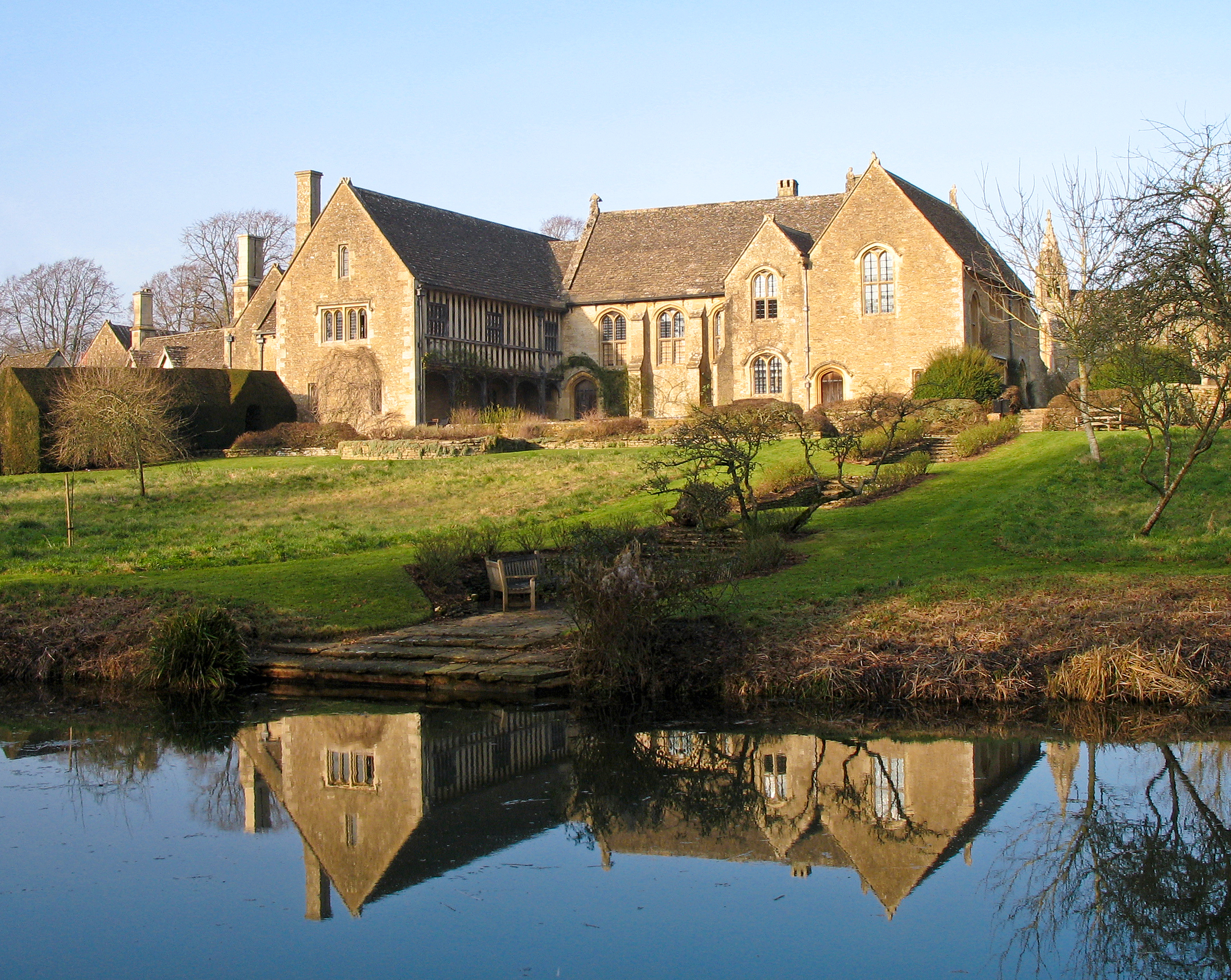
Great Chalfield Manor

Tropenell, later of Great Chalfield, Neston, and Salisbury, was born about 1405, the son of Henry Tropenell and his wife, Edith, who was the daughter of Walter Roche.

Augustus Pugin, in a chapter on Great Chalfield in his Examples of Gothic architecture, gives a pedigree of the Tropenell family stated to be taken from "a MS now in the possession of William Waldron, Esq." According to this, "long before the time that no mind renueth, and before the conquest" a Wiltshire knight named Sir Osbert Tropenell was lord of the whole lordship of Sapworth. Of his two sons, James and Walter, the second son, Walter, received lands in Sherston, Ivy Church, Whaddon and Combe, and married Catherine, the daughter of Sir William Percy, sister of Sir Harry Percy, lords of "Much Chaldefeld, otherwise called East Chaldefeld", having a son, Philip, and a daughter, Galiana. Philip married Isawde, daughter of Richard Cotell, of "Cotells Atteward, otherwise Little Atteward", and left two sons, Roger and John, dividing his land between them. Roger married Christian, daughter of Sir John Rous, lord of Immer, and their son John Tropenell married Agnes, daughter of James Lye, lord of Liniford. Their son Harry Tropenell, who married Edith, the daughter of Walter Roche, younger brother of Sir John Roche, of Bromham, was the father of Thomas Tropenell.

== Life ==
A common lawyer by profession, Tropenell turned himself into "a long-headed, thrifty business man" and was anxious to use his abilities to become a substantial landowner. He spent most of his life in the south-west of England, especially in Wiltshire.

He married firstly Agnes Ludlow, the widow of Thomas Bourton, who was cousin and heir of John Bourton the younger of Atworth.

Lord Hungerford conveyed the manor of Hill Deverill to Tropenell and Agnes in December 1447. He acquired the manor of Great Chalfield in 1454, after a legal challenge based on the marriage of his ancestor Walter Tropenell with Katharine, daughter of Sir William Percy, and built Great Chalfield Manor. During his life Tropenell acquired a large number of manors, not without battles along the way, and this prompted him to assemble his Tropenell Cartulary, compiled in the reign of Edward IV.

Tropenell married secondly, probably in May 1456, his cousin Margaret, the second daughter of William Ludlow of Hill Deverill and the widow of John Erley, who in 1450–1451 was Member of Parliament for Ludgershall.

While many others were troubled by having taken sides in the Wars of the Roses, Tropenell gave no mortal offence to either side, and in the reign of Richard III, about 1484, he even received a pardon from the new king, recorded as "Thomas Tropenelle of Chaldefeld in the Countie of Wiltshire Squier hathe a generalle pardonne."

Tropenell died in 1488 holding Great Chalfield from the Duchy of Lancaster "as of the honour of Trowbridge. He left the whole of his property to his son Christopher Tropenell, except for "one white bed" bequeathed to his daughter Mary. He was entombed in the chapel of the Blessed Mary at Corsham, now the north chancel chapel of the Church of England parish church, where his large altar tomb, shared with his first wife, Agnes, survives.

== Likeness ==
A wall painting in the parlour of Great Chalfield Manor is traditionally claimed to be a portrait of Tropenell. Apparently of the right period, it shows a burly man wearing a gown trimmed with ermine and what may be a beaver hat, holding what appears to be a money bag.

== Arms ==
The arms of Tropenell are blazoned: gules, a fess engrailed ermine, between three griffins' heads erased argent. These appear in several places at Great Chalfield Manor, sometimes accompanied by the family badge, a yoke, and the motto "Le joug tyra bellement" ('the yoke drew well').
