= Broughton Gifford Halt railway station =

Disused railway station in England

Broughton Gifford Halt
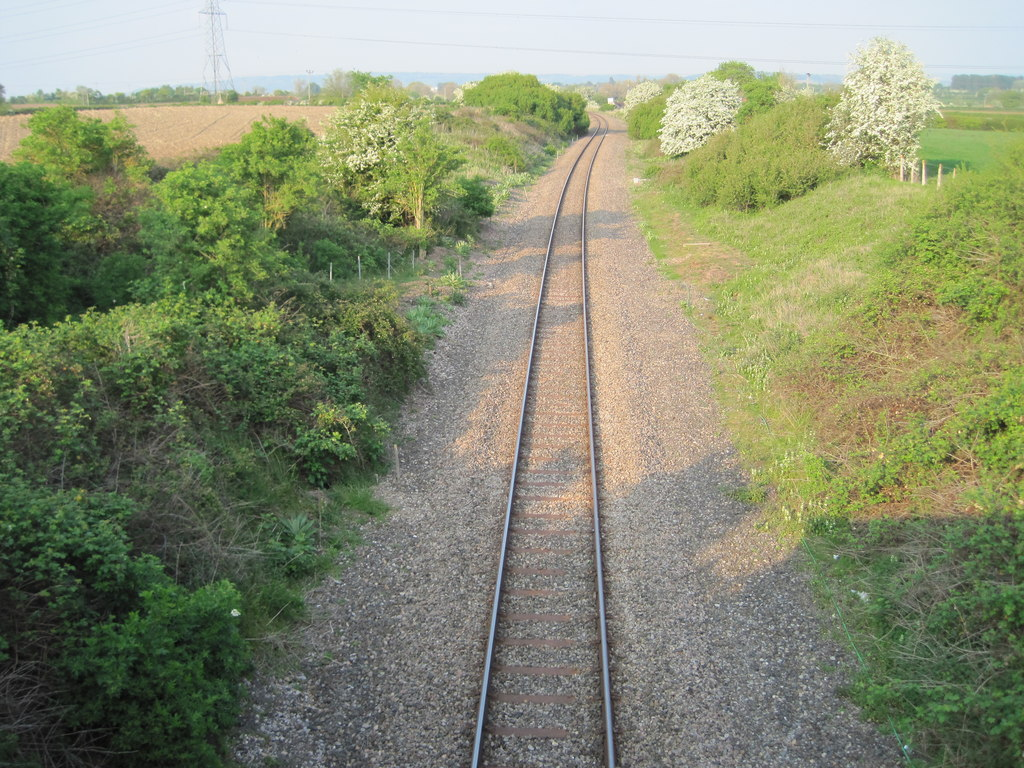
- The site of the station in 2011

General information
- Location: Broughton Gifford, Wiltshire; England
- Coordinates: 51.36373°N 2.16703°W
- Platforms: 2

Other information
- Status: Disused

History
- Opened: 29 October 1905
- Closed: 7 February 1955
- Original company: Great Western Railway
- Pre-grouping: Great Western Railway
- Post-grouping: Great Western Railway
Location

Broughton Gifford Halt was a small railway station serving Broughton Gifford in Wiltshire, England, opened in 1905 for the newly introduced steam railcar service between Chippenham and Trowbridge.

The halt was southeast of the village at the Mill Lane bridge, near the road between Melksham and Bradford-on-Avon; it was closed in 1955 but the line remains open.

Preceding station	Historical railways	Following station
Melksham; Line and station open	Great Western Railway; Wessex Main Line	Holt Junction; Line open, station closed
