= Great Chalfield Manor =

Grade I listed English country house in Wiltshire in the United Kingdom

Coordinates: 51.3676°N 2.2022°W

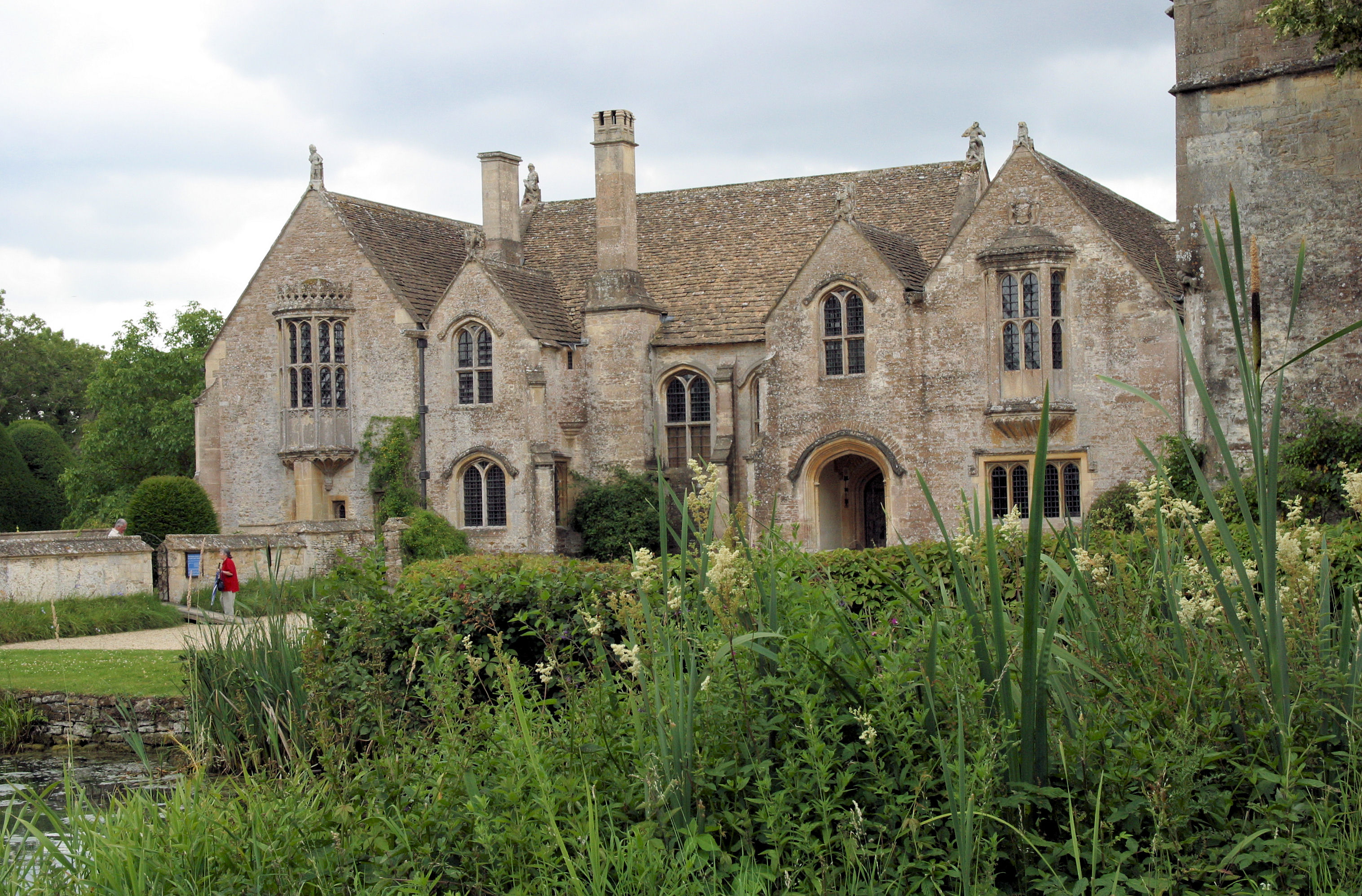
Great Chalfield: the externally symmetrical entrance front

Great Chalfield Manor is an English country house at Great Chalfield, about 2.5 miles (4 km) northeast of the town of Bradford on Avon in the west of the county of Wiltshire.

== History ==
Nikolaus Pevsner describes Great Chalfield as "one of the most perfect examples of the late medieval English manor house".

The moated manor house was built around 1465–1480 for Thomas Tropenell, a modest member of the landed gentry who made a fortune as a clothier. It is on the site of an earlier fortified house, of which traces remain: the bases of curtain walls to the east and north, and parts of two towers.

The independent hall, lit on both sides, is flanked by unusually symmetrical gabled cross wings, with oriel windows and lower gabled porches in the inner corners, in the north-facing former entrance court, for which the richest effects were reserved. Its external symmetry, unusual for its date, is superficial. The intimately connected parish church, largely rebuilt by Tropenell, also faces into the court, which was formerly entered obliquely through a gatehouse in the west wing; Nicholas Cooper observes of the church that "the probable need to pass through the house's forecourt in order to reach it neatly demonstrates the community of secular and religious authority". Part of a moat survives, but the forecourt has been opened up to the outside in a manner that changes its original inward-facing aspect.

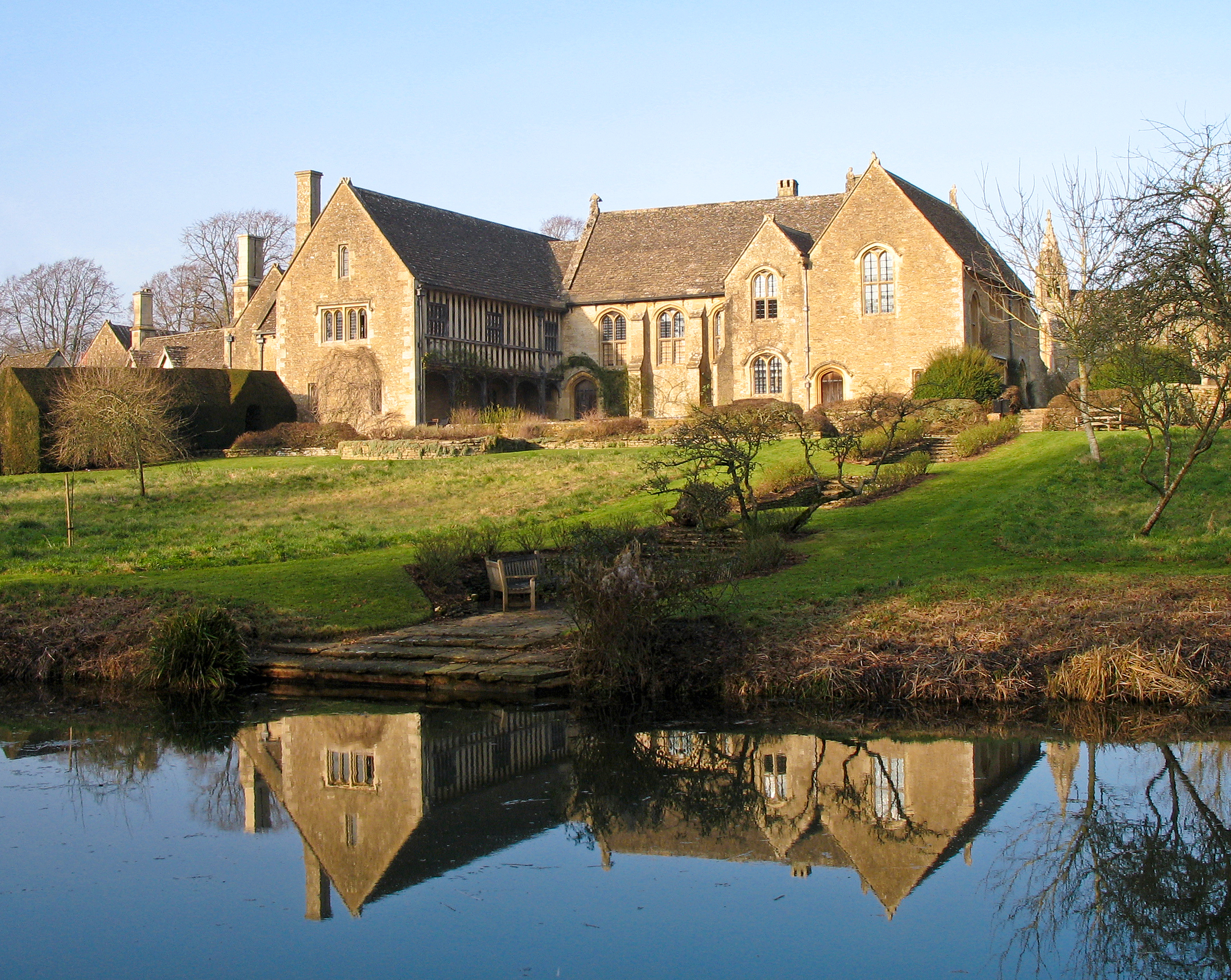
Great Chalfield: the less formal southern aspect

The house passed into the Eyre family by the marriage of Ann Tropenell to John Eyre of Wedhampton in 1550. It passed down in the Eyre family for three generations until 1631 when Sir John Eyre sold it to Sir Richard Gurney, 1st Baronet, Lord Mayor of London. It afterwards passed via Thomas and William Hanham, John Hall of Bradford and Evelyn Pierrepont, 2nd Duke of Kingston-upon-Hull to Robert Neale.

The house was altered substantially (with some of the original character lost) after the Neale family commissioned the architect Thomas Larkins Walker, a pupil of Augustus Pugin, to carry out a detailed survey of the manor in 1836; though his restoration proposals of 1837 were never carried out, the house was reduced and in particular, the great hall, adapted as a farmhouse, lost its ornate ceiling, with only one of the original bosses surviving.

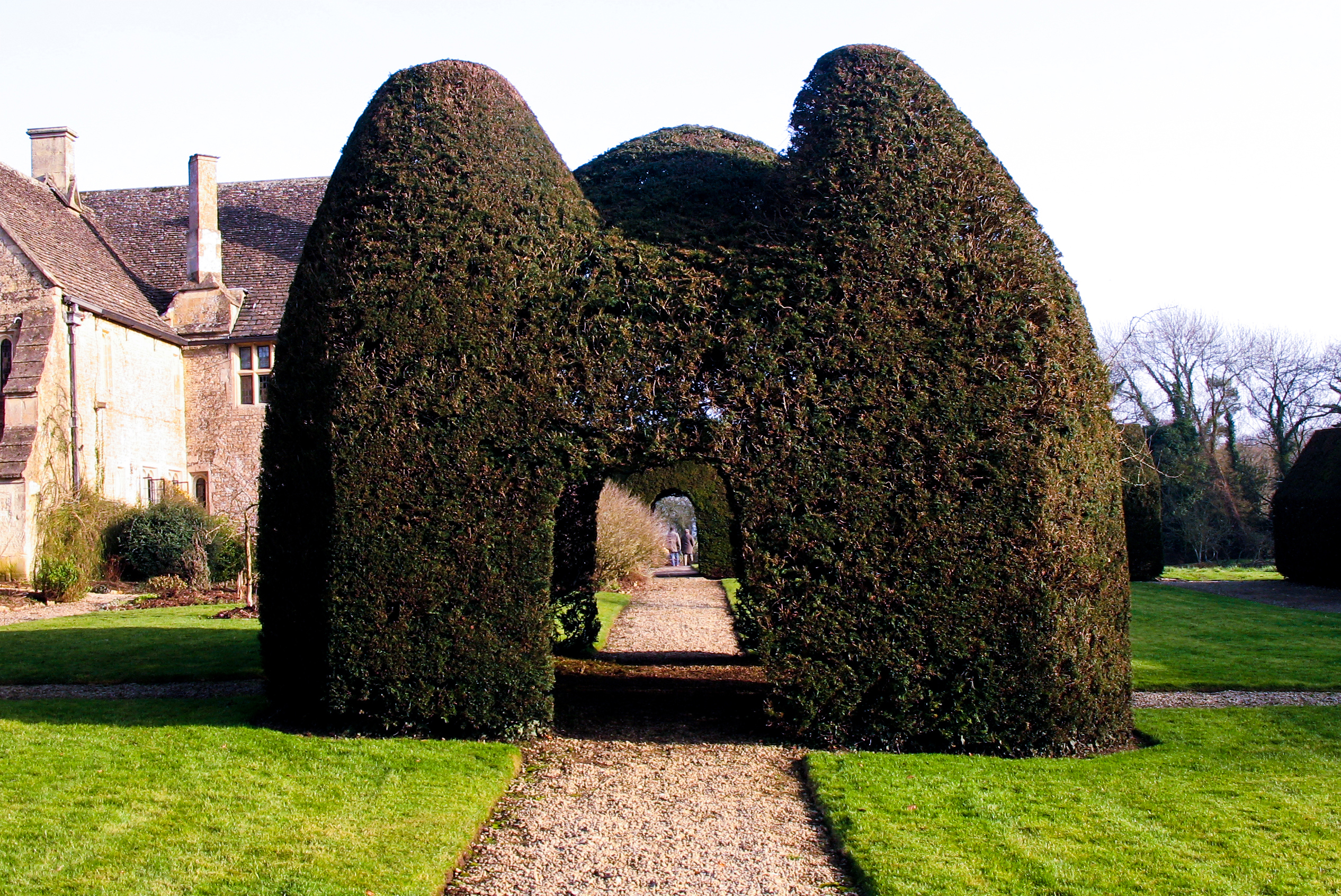
One of four clipped yew garden features

Externally there is a garden with four "tree houses", groups of four clipped yews that have grown together and been hollowed out inside to allow one to walk through.

== 20th century and today ==
The house and garden were purchased by George Fuller (of Neston Park) in the early 1900s, and restored and furnished between 1905 and 1911 by his fourth son, Major Robert Fuller, under the guidance of Sir Harold Brakspear. The restoration included a sympathetic garden design by Alfred Parsons.

Robert Fuller gave the house and nine acres of land to the National Trust in 1943, and it is open to the public. Robert Floyd, grandson of Robert Fuller, and his family live here and manage the property for the Trust. Tours of the house are at fixed times and visitors are escorted by a guide.

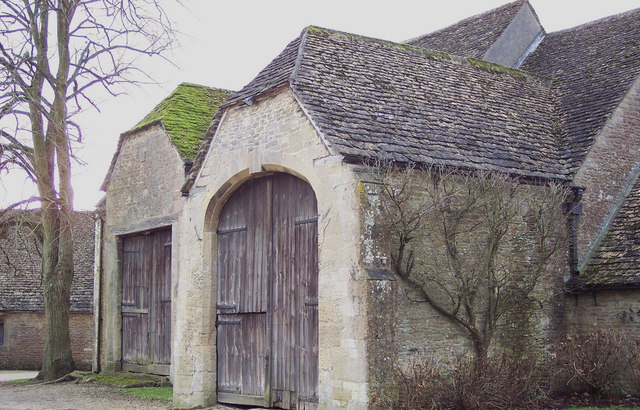
Doors of the barn

The house is Grade I listed; the Tropenell Cartulary manuscript, compiled for Thomas Tropenell, is still kept there. The barn northwest of the house, built in the 17th and 18th centuries, is also Grade I listed, while the gardens are Grade II listed.

== Church ==
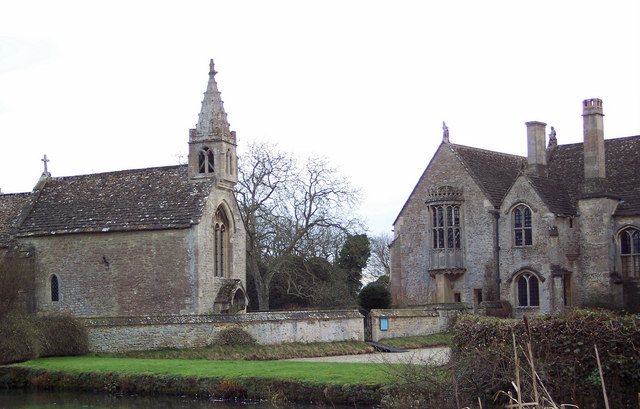
All Saints' Church stands close to the house

All Saints' Church, near the front of the house, is a small church dating from the 14th century. It is Great Chalfield's parish church, although the civil parish was amalgamated into the newly created parish of Atworth in 1884.

A chapel at Great Chalfield was first mentioned in 1316; in 1428 it was a church with fewer than ten parishioners. The present church was built c. 1480 by Thomas Tropenell and the surviving features from that time include the south chapel, the small square bellcote and the roof of the nave. Robert Neale carried out improvements in 1775 which included the addition of a family chapel, now used as a vestry, to the east of the south chapel. Several windows are from the 19th century and further restoration was undertaken in 1914. The font is 13th century and the pulpit 17th.

Church registers survive from 1605. The building was designated as Grade I listed in 1962. Today the church is part of the benefice of Broughton Gifford, Great Chalfield & Holt.

== Film location ==
The house and grounds have been used for location filming including: Wives and Daughters (1999); Persuasion (2007); The Other Boleyn Girl (2008); Tess of the d'Urbervilles (2008); Wolf Hall (2014); Poldark (2015); and The White Princess (2017). For Wolf Hall: The Mirror and the Light (2024), scenes were shot in the study and in the Great Hall, while exterior filming was done in the Arts and Crafts gardens.
