= Atworth =

Village in Wiltshire, England

Coordinates: 51.393°N 2.195°W

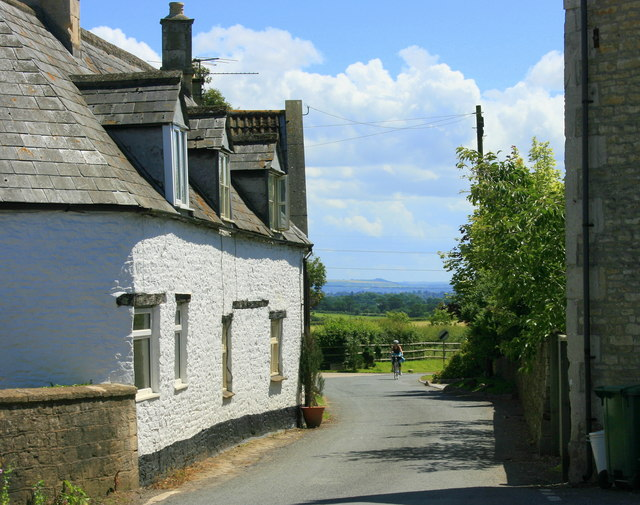
- Bradford Road, Atworth

- Location within Wiltshire
- Population: 1,292 (in 2021)
- OS grid reference: ST865660
- Civil parish: Atworth
- Unitary authority: Wiltshire
- Ceremonial county: Wiltshire
- Region: South West
- Country: England
- Sovereign state: United Kingdom
- Post town: MELKSHAM
- Postcode district: SN12
- Dialling code: 01225
- Police: Wiltshire
- Fire: Dorset and Wiltshire
- Ambulance: South Western
- UK Parliament: Melksham and Devizes
- Website: Parish Council

Atworth is a village and civil parish in west Wiltshire, England. The village is on the A365 between Melksham and Box, about 2.5 miles (4 km) northwest of Melksham and 4 miles (6 km) northeast of Bradford on Avon. The hamlet of Purlpit lies east of Atworth village, and in the south of the parish are the small village of Great Chalfield and the hamlet of Little Chalfield.

The Roman road from Silchester to Bath forms the northern boundary of the parish, and to the south of it is the settlement of Beardwell.

== History ==
The present-day civil parish of Atworth was created in 1884 from four former parishes or tithings.

=== Atworth ===
Atworth was a tithing in the northeast of the large ancient parish of Bradford on Avon. This land forms the northern half of the modern parish, with the Roman road from Silchester to Bath as its northern boundary.

A Roman villa (excavated in 1937 and 1971) was a short distance northwest of the present village of Atworth. Poplar Farmhouse is from the 15th century and Manor Farmhouse is from the early 18th century. At Church Farm the farmhouse is late 18th century, and a seven-bay barn which is probably 16th-century is Grade II* listed.

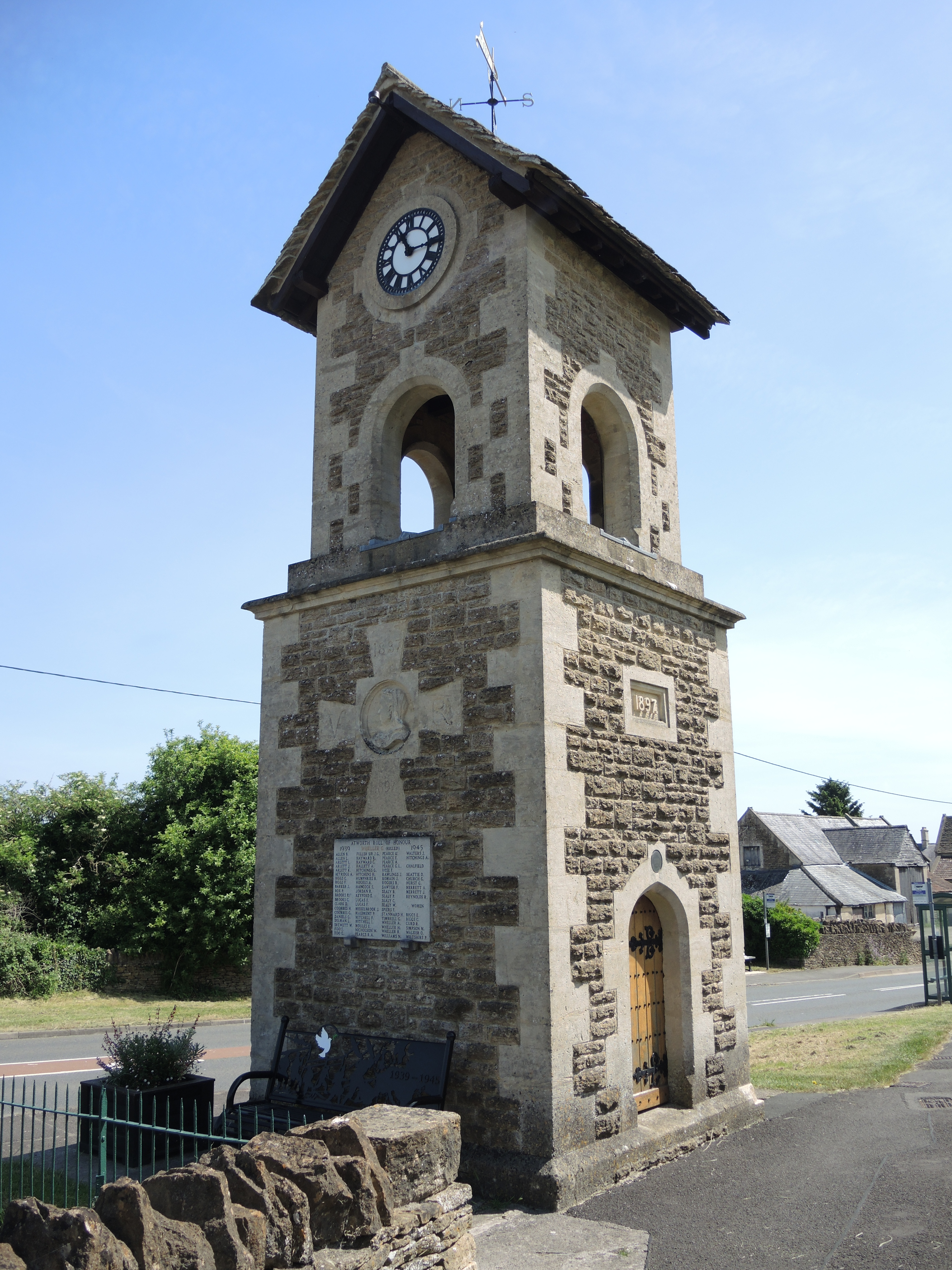
Atworth clock tower

A clock tower was erected at the side of the Bath Road in 1887 to commemorate Queen Victoria's golden jubilee, and later served as the parish war memorial.

=== Great Chalfield ===
Great Chalfield (or East Chalfield), to the south of Atworth, was a separate parish until 1884. Great Chalfield Manor was built in the mid-15th century and is Grade I listed; nearby is a barn which is partly 17th-century and also Grade I listed.

=== Little Chalfield ===
Little Chalfield (or West Chalfield) was a separate manor and, in the 14th and 15th centuries, a separate parish. There was a church or chapel, recorded in conveyances up to 1701, but then lost without trace. Little Chalfield became an extra-parochial area until the civil parish of Little Chalfield with Cottles was created in 1857. Little Chalfield Manor is from the early 19th century.

=== Cottles ===
Cottles (or Atworth Cottles) was part of the ancient parish of Bradford, then became extra-parochial until 1857. There is no present-day settlement but the name continues in Cottles Wood and Cottles House, a 16th-century country house in limestone ashlar, occupied since 1939 by Stonar School.

== Geography ==
The South Brook, a small tributary of the Bristol Avon, passes close to Atworth and through Purlpit. Chalfield Brook, another tributary, passes both Chalfields and forms part of the southern boundary of the parish.

The Neston Park estate extends south into Atworth parish.

== Religious sites ==
The Church of England parish church of St Michael and All Angels is at the west edge of the village, where a church has stood since the 11th century. The church was rebuilt in 1451 but only the tower survives, next to an 1832 building by H.E. Goodridge, who around the same time designed the enlargement of Cottles House. Pevsner was unimpressed with the newer church: "The exterior has merits, the interior hardly". The three bells in the tower were cast in c.1350, 1606 and 1786; at present they are unringable. The church is Grade II* listed, and several monuments in the churchyard are Grade II listed.

Atworth church, with South Wraxall annexed, was anciently a chapelry of Bradford; it became a perpetual curacy in 1847. In 1962, part of the area of the benefice of Atworth with South Wraxall was transferred to Monkton Farleigh. Shaw was added to the benefice in 1972, and today the church is part of the benefice of Atworth with Shaw and Whitley, alongside Christ Church at Shaw.

Atworth Independent Chapel was built in the 1790s. It is affiliated to the Fellowship of Independent Evangelical Churches.

A Baptist church, Ebenezer Church, was opened at Atworth in 1864 and closed in 1979.

All Saints church at Great Chalfield Manor is Grade I listed and dates from the 14th century. Today it is linked to the churches at Broughton Gifford and Holt.

== Amenities ==
Atworth has a primary school called Churchfields, The Village School (not to be confused with Churchfields Academy, Swindon). The school building dates from 1828; until 1953 the school took pupils of all ages. Following the closure in 2006 of small schools at Monkton Farleigh and South Wraxall, the school has two sites: Atworth and Monkton Farleigh.

Stonar School at Cottles Park is an independent school for boarding and day pupils of all ages.

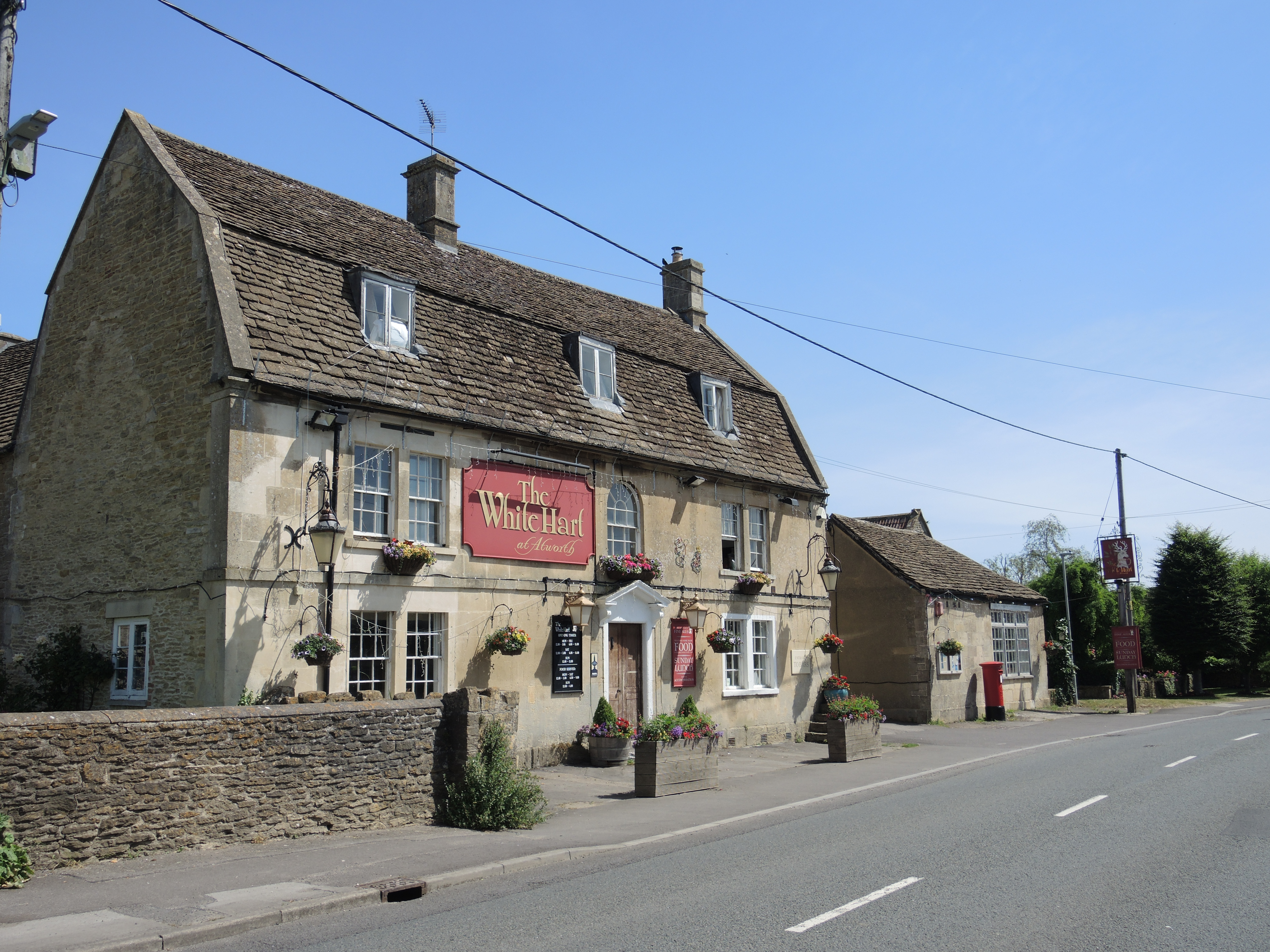
The White Hart pub

Atworth has a 17th-century pub, the White Hart.

== Landmarks ==
At least three village pumps survive.

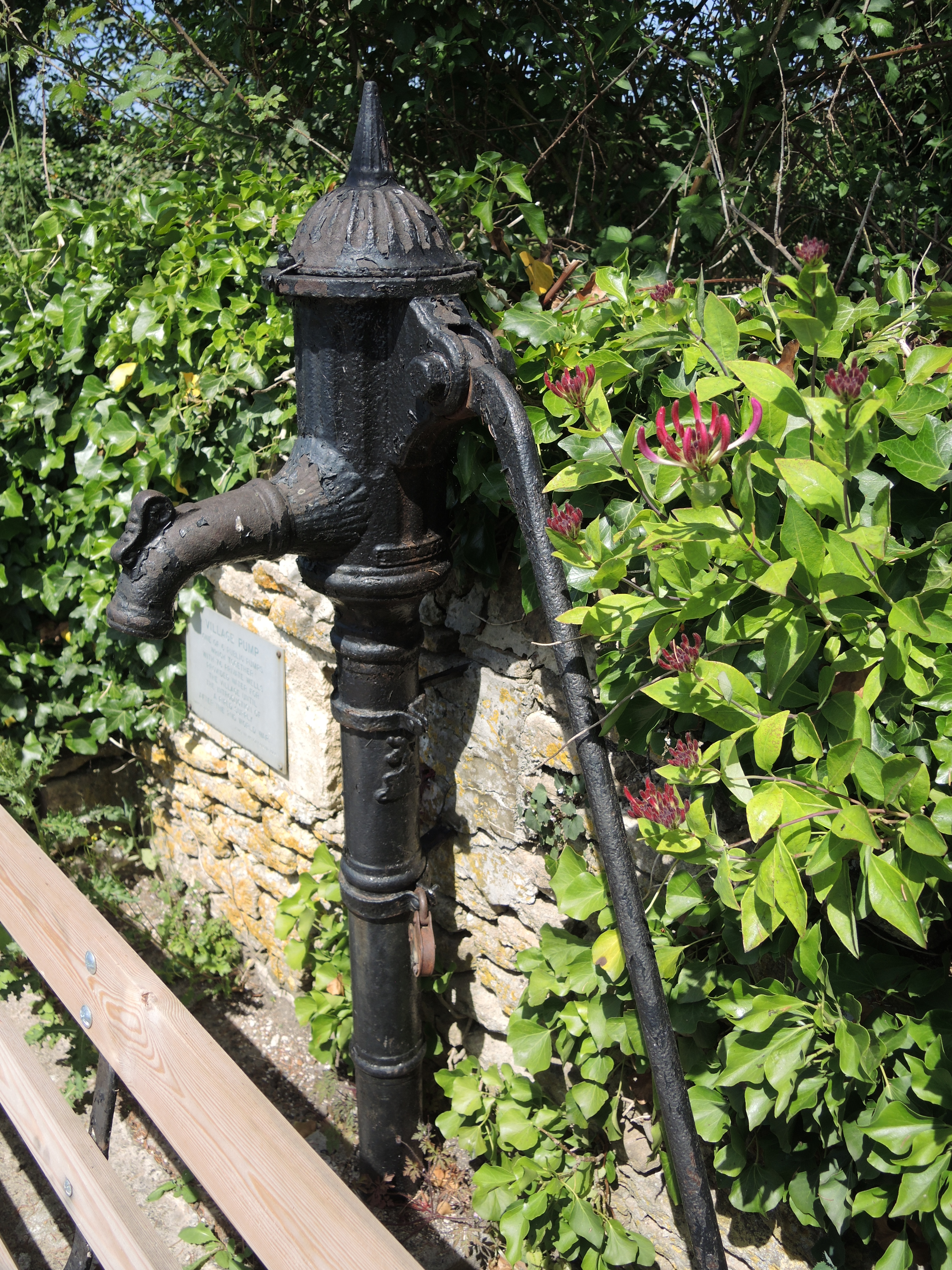
One of Atworth's surviving village pumps

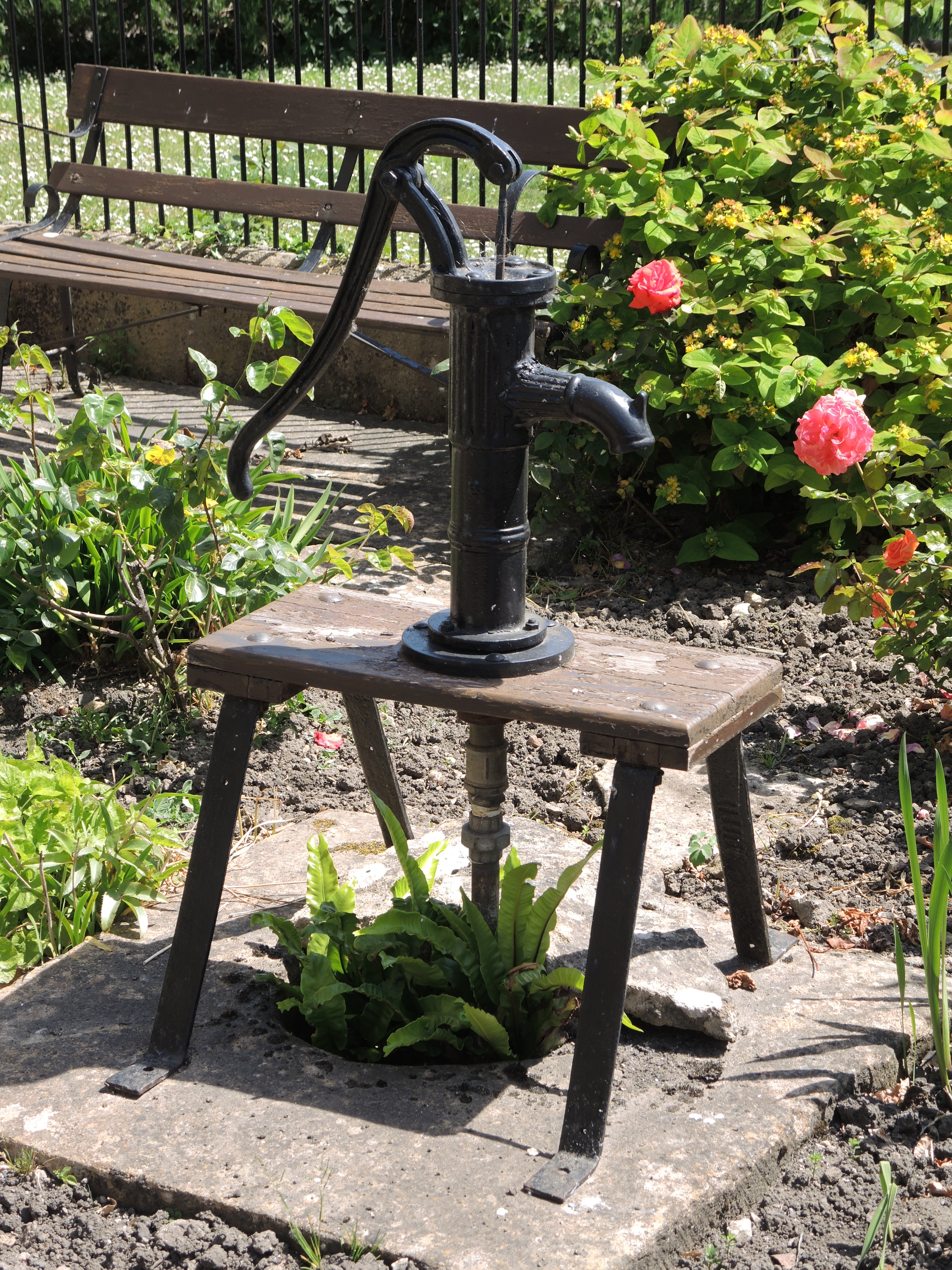
Another surviving village pump in Atworth

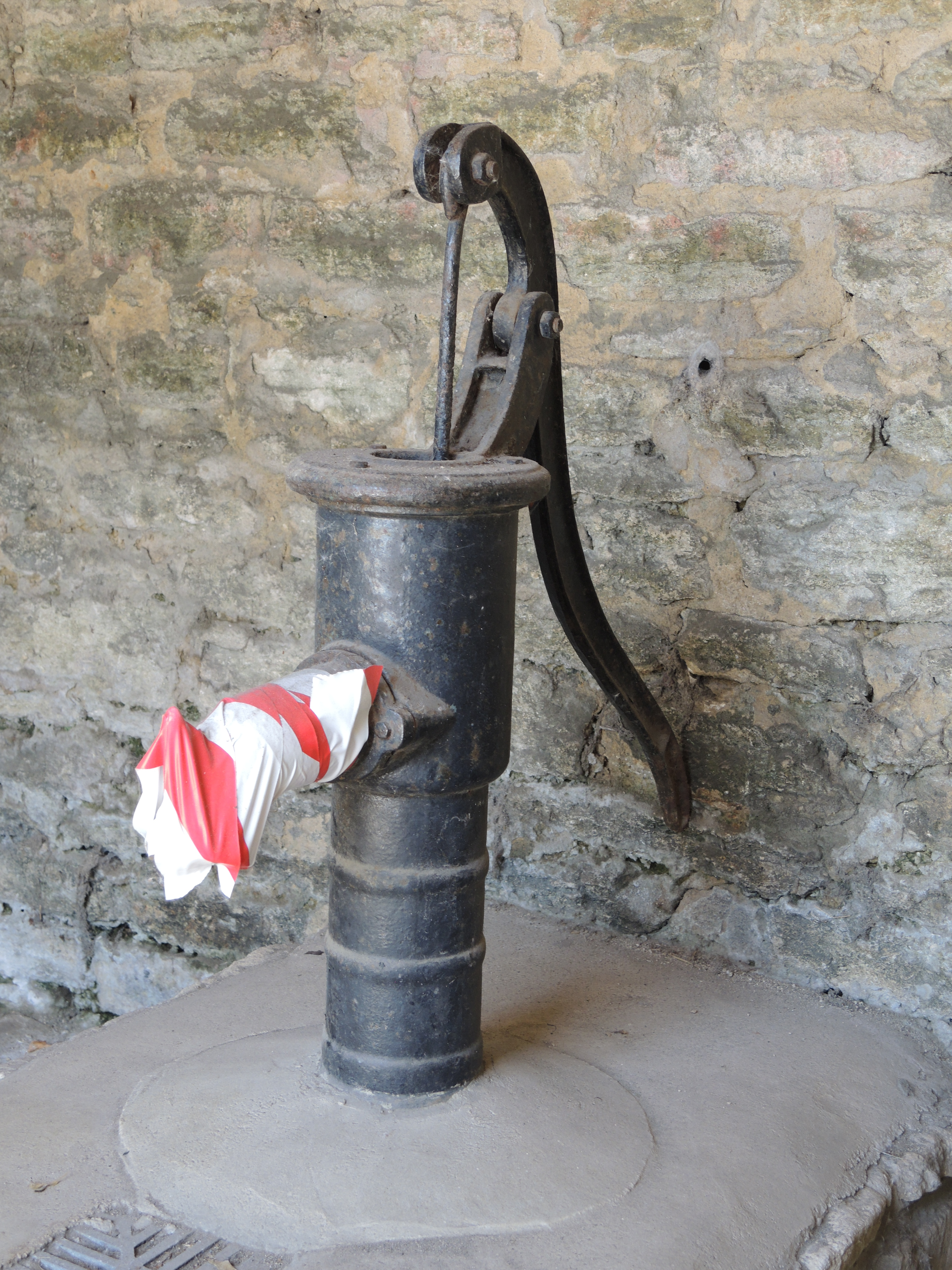
A village pump with a broken spout

== Freedom of the Parish ==
The following people and military units have received the Freedom of the Parish of Atworth.

=== Individuals ===
- David Webb, former chairman of Atworth Parish Council: April 2014.
