= Gifford Hall =

Grade II* listed house

Coordinates: 51°22′43″N 2°10′54″W

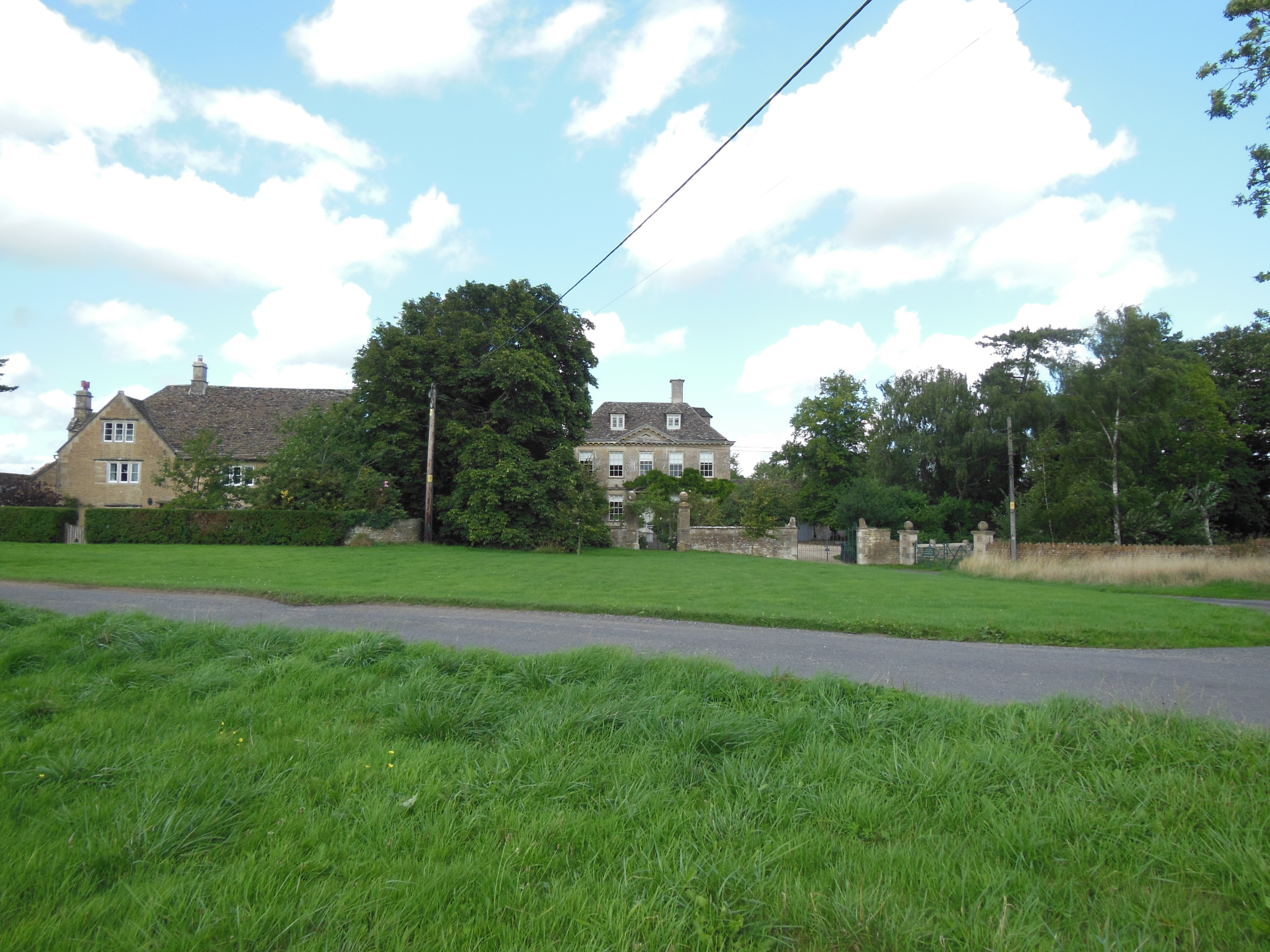
Gifford Hall (right)

Gifford Hall is a Grade II* listed house on the Common at Broughton Gifford, Wiltshire, England. It dates from around 1700 and is limestone ashlar with a hipped stone slate roof with stone stacks. It was built for the Harding family.
