= Mary Forster =

British watercolour painter (1853–1885)

Emma Judith Mary Forster
- Born: 6 December 1853
- Died: 2 May 1885 (aged 31)
- Known for: Painting
- Spouse: Samuel Hill Smith Lofthouse (m. 1884)

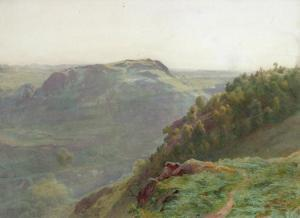
A Valley Scene by Mary Forster

(Emma Judith) Mary Forster (1853–1885) was a British water-colour painter.

== Life ==
Forster was born on 6 December 1853. She was the daughter of Thomas Barton Watkin Forster and Emma Stewart (born Galbraith), a landscape-painter, of Holt Manor, Bradford-on-Avon, Wiltshire. Her father was an amateur painter who had exhibited since 1859 and he and his daughter would go on sketching trips to locations that included France and Wales. Forster exhibited at the Royal Academy in 1876, 1878 and 1880.

In 1884 she became an associate of the Royal Institute of Painters in Water Colours. On 3 June 1884 she married Samuel Hill Smith Lofthouse who was a barrister who went on to be an honorary secretary to the Bar Committee and an assistant recorder. She only briefly exhibited under her married name as she died on 2 May 1885 in Lower Halliford on the Thames during childbirth. Her brief career was marked by an exhibition of 26 of her works later that summer and a brief obituary in the Dictionary of National Biography.
