= Great Chalfield =

Village in Wiltshire, England

Coordinates: 51.368°N 2.202°W

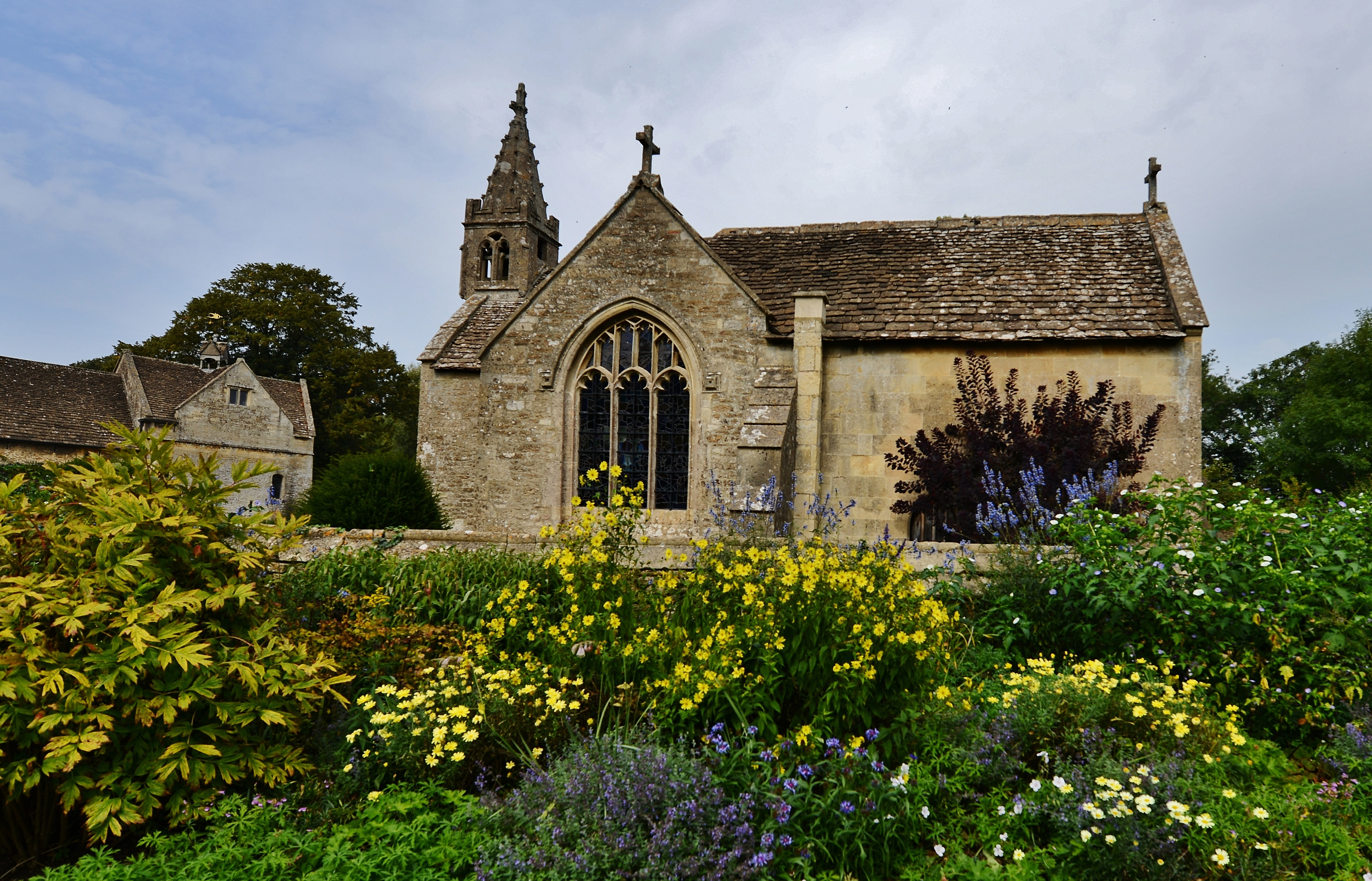
- All Saints' Church, Great Chalfield

- Location within Wiltshire
- OS grid reference: ST860632
- Civil parish: Atworth
- Unitary authority: Wiltshire
- Ceremonial county: Wiltshire
- Region: South West
- Country: England
- Sovereign state: United Kingdom
- Post town: MELKSHAM
- Postcode district: SN12
- Police: Wiltshire
- Fire: Dorset and Wiltshire
- Ambulance: South Western
- UK Parliament: Melksham and Devizes

Great Chalfield, also sometimes called by its Latin name of Chalfield Magna, formerly East Chalfield and anciently Much Chaldefield, is a small village and former civil parish, now in the parish of Atworth, in west Wiltshire, England. Its nearest towns are Melksham, about 3 miles (4.8 km) away to the northeast, and Bradford-on-Avon, at about the same distance to the southwest.

The village has a notable manor house, Great Chalfield Manor.

== History ==
At the time of the Domesday survey (1086) it was found that the manor of Chalfield had belonged to Wallef in the time of King Edward and possessed half a mill worth eighteen pence. This suggests that the two Chalfields (Great and Little, or East and West) shared a water-mill which stood on the stream which lies between them. A corn mill was operating at Great Chalfield in 1645 while it was occupied by a Parliamentary garrison.

The 15th-century manor house, Great Chalfield Manor, is a Grade I listed building. It was given to the National Trust in 1943, with nine acres of land and an endowment fund, by Major R. F. Fuller, the lord of the manor.

In 1676, Great Chalfield had only eighteen residents. In 1881 the parish had a population of 34. The civil parish was abolished in 1884 and its area incorporated into the new parish of Atworth.

A detailed parish history was published by the Wiltshire Victoria County History in its volume 7 (1953).

== Church ==
The small Church of England parish church, adjacent to the manor house and approached through the gatehouse of the manor, is dedicated to All Saints and has a chancel, a nave, a vestry, a south chapel, a bell-cote crowned by a short octagonal spire, and a porch on its west side. Of the original 14th-century church only part of its nave survives, a new chancel having been built about 1480, when the porch and south chapel were added. The present vestry was added to the east of the chapel in 1775.

The single bell was cast in 1627. There are traces of wall paintings and of panels depicting the life of St Katherine, which were described in 1760 before being whitewashed over. The vestry screen may date from the late 15th century, and the oak pulpit is late 17th century. The organ case is richly decorated and looks medieval but is modern. The church was designated as Grade I listed in 1962.

The income of the rectory was low, and in 1953 it was stated that no rector had resided at Great Chalfield for many years. The benefice was united with Broughton Gifford in 1956, and the incumbent was to live at Broughton Gifford; from 1974 the united benefice was held in plurality with Holt. Today the church is part of the benefice of Broughton Gifford, Great Chalfield and Holt.

The parish registers survive for the following dates: christenings 1545–1991, marriages 1608–1993, burials 1581–1985.

== Notable people ==
In the 15th century Thomas Tropenell (c. 1405–1488) built much of the small village of Great Chalfield, including the manor, where he lived, and amassed a large landed estate. The Tropenell Cartulary manuscript, still kept at Great Chalfield Manor, was compiled for him as a record of his property acquisitions.

John Lewis (1685–1761), an antiquarian and diarist, was rector of the parish from 1713 to 1761

In 1809, the antiquary Richard Warner was appointed rector of the parish. He may never have resided, but in 1830 The Edinburgh literary journal noted "Some of our readers may perhaps ask Who is the Rev. Richard Warner? We can only answer, that he is the Rector of Great Chalfield, Wilts".

== Bibliography ==
- Augustus Welby Northmore Pugin, in Examples of Gothic architecture (1821), A historical account of the Manor House and Church at Great Chalfield, Wiltshire online.
- Thomas Larkins Walker, The History and Antiquities of the Manor House and Church of Great Chalfield, Wiltshire, illustrated by Twenty-eight Plates of Plans, Elevations, Sections, Parts at large, and a Perspective View (1837)
- H. P. Pafford, ed., Accounts of the parliamentary garrisons of Great Chalfield and Malmesbury, 1645–1646 (Wiltshire Record Society, vol. 2, 1940)
