= Tropenell Cartulary =

The Tropenell Cartulary is an English medieval manuscript cartulary compiled for Thomas Tropenell (c. 1405 – 1488), a Wiltshire landowner, in the 15th century.

== History ==
A cartulary is a medieval manuscript, usually taking the form of a bound book or a roll, in which original documents have been copied out or summarized. The Tropenell Cartulary was compiled during the reign of Edward IV and records Tropenell's steady progress as a landowner seeking to enlarge his estates, not without battles along the way.

The document consists of a single large bound volume, written on vellum, and its principal purpose is to establish Tropenell's title to his manors and other estates, copying out a large number of deeds, charters, and other documents, most of which would otherwise have been lost to posterity. Unusually, the volume is still kept at Great Chalfield Manor, where it was created, its ownership having descended with the house through the centuries.

== Editions ==
- John Silvester Davies, ed., The Tropenell cartulary: being the contents of an old Wiltshire muniment chest, 2 vols. (Wiltshire Archaeological and Natural History Society, 1908)
