= Simon Burton (physician) =

English physician

Simon Burton, M.D., F.R.C.P. (c. 1690–1744), was an English physician.

== Life ==
Burton was born in Warwickshire about 1690, being the eldest son of Humphrey Burton, of Caresly, near Coventry. His mother was Judith, daughter of the Rev. Abraham Bohun, He was educated at Rugby School, and at New College, Oxford, where he proceeded B.A. 29 November 1710; M.A. 26 May 1714; M.B. 20 April 1716; and M.D. 21 July 1720. After practising for some years at Warwick, he removed to London, where he established himself in Savile Row, and obtained a large practice. He was admitted, 12 April 1731, a candidate of the Royal College of Physicians, of which he became a fellow on 3 April 1732.

On 19 October, in the following year Burton was appointed physician to St. George's Hospital, and subsequently royal physician in ordinary. He was one of the physicians who attended Alexander Pope in his last illness. He had a dispute on that occasion with Dr. Thomas Thompson, a well-known quack, and reference is made to it in the satire One Thousand Seven Hundred and Forty-Four, a Poem, by a Great Poet lately deceased. Burton survived Pope somewhat less than a fortnight, and died, after a few days' illness, 11 June 1744, at his house in Savile Row.
