= Broughton Gifford =

Village in Wiltshire, England

Coordinates: 51.371°N 2.175°W

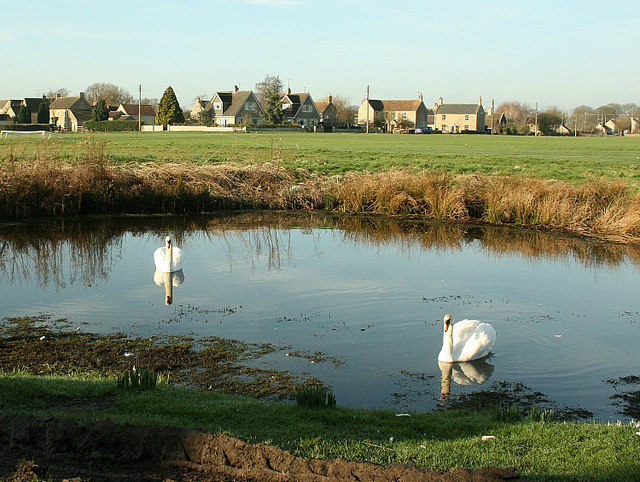
- Pond on Broughton Gifford common

- Location within Wiltshire
- Population: 851 (in 2011)
- OS grid reference: ST879635
- Unitary authority: Wiltshire
- Ceremonial county: Wiltshire
- Region: South West
- Country: England
- Sovereign state: United Kingdom
- Post town: Melksham
- Postcode district: SN12
- Dialling code: 01225
- Police: Wiltshire
- Fire: Dorset and Wiltshire
- Ambulance: South Western
- UK Parliament: Melksham and Devizes
- Website: Parish Council

Broughton Gifford is a village and civil parish about 1.5 miles (2.4 km) west of Melksham in Wiltshire, England. The parish includes the hamlets of Norrington Common and The Common.

== History ==
The name Broughton derives from the Old English brōctūn meaning 'settlement by a brook'. The affix Gifford derives from John Giffard, who held the village in 1281.

Formerly much of Broughton Gifford and the surrounding area was covered with woodland. Much of this was felled during the First and Second World Wars. Villagers long used the common to graze their livestock and grow their crops. Although the common was not included when the rest of the parish's lands were inclosed in 1783, eventually its agricultural uses died out.

== Railway ==
The Wessex Main Line railway was opened across the south-east of the parish in 1848, following the Avon valley. In October 1905 a small station, Broughton Gifford Halt, was opened for the newly introduced steam railcar service between Chippenham and Trowbridge. The halt was south-east of the village at the Mill Lane bridge, near the road between Melksham and Bradford-on-Avon; it was closed on 7 February 1955 but the line remains open.

== Geography ==
The village has two parts. The lower village has the church, the school and the village hall. There are also two housing estates and some detached houses in this part.

The higher part, known as The Common, is a large area of open land surrounded by houses. As of 2008, there were three ponds on the Common, inhabited by a paddling of ducks during their breeding season. At one end of the Common are the Bell public house, the football pitch, and the bowling green.

The River Avon forms a natural boundary to the south and east of the parish.

== Local government ==
The civil parish elects a parish council. It is in the area of Wiltshire Council unitary authority, which is responsible for most significant local government functions.

Unusually, the parish shares some land in common with the parish of Melksham Without.

== Religious sites ==
=== Parish church ===
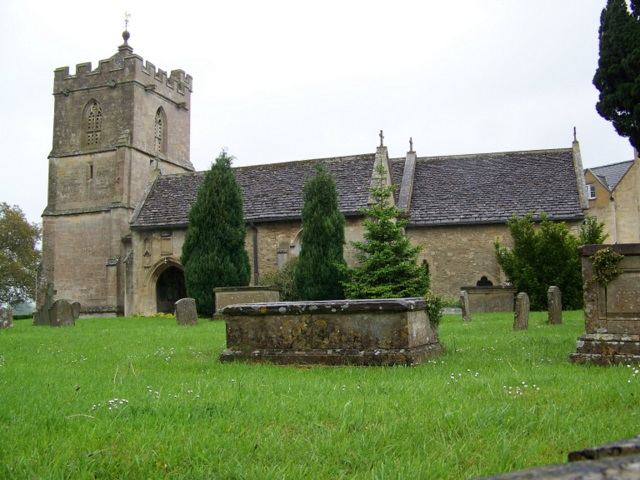
Parish church

The Church of England parish church of St Mary the Virgin, at the south end of the village, is from the 13th century and is a Grade I listed building. Additions in the 14th century included the south chapel, and the tower was added in the 15th. The rectory was built in 1848 to designs of T.H. Wyatt, and the church was lightly restored by G.G. Scott in 1878.

St Mary's is part of the united benefice of St Katherine's at Holt, together with All Saints at Great Chalfield.

=== Chapels ===
A Particular Baptist chapel was built in 1806 on the east side of the common, and is still in use.

A Wesleyan Methodist chapel was built in 1828 and replaced by a larger building in 1907. The chapel closed c. 2008 and is now a private home.

== Notable buildings ==
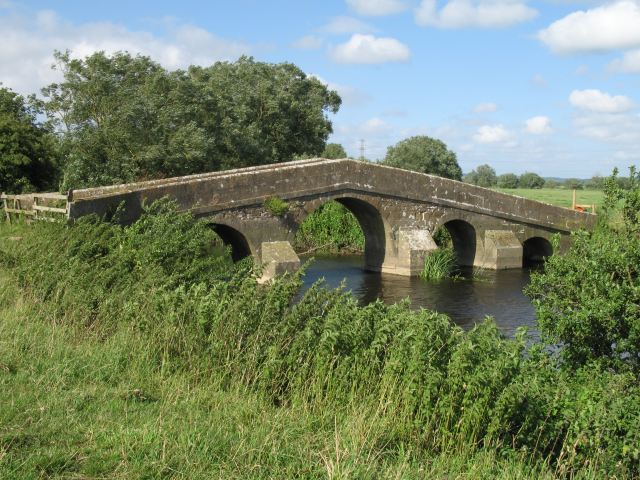
Packhorse bridge over the Avon

Three houses are Grade II* listed:

- Gifford Hall, c.1700, The Common
- Manor House, early 17th century, on the road to The Common
- Monkton House, 1647, south of the village, by the Avon

In March 2015 Mr Daniel Gerber, of Gifford Hall, obtained a decision in the High Court quashing a planning permission granted by Wiltshire Council for a £10.5 million solar farm erected by Norrington Solar Farm Limited and Terraform Power. This decision was then overturned, allowing the solar farm to remain, some distance to the north of Gifford Hall.

A packhorse bridge dating from 1725 spans the River Avon to the south of Broughton Gifford, providing a route (now a public footpath) to the hamlet of Whaddon.

== Amenities ==
The village has a primary school, St Mary's, a short distance north of the church. Its first building dates from 1856, when it became a National School following the rebuilding of an earlier charity school. The school became Voluntary controlled in 1952 and was remodelled and extended in 1975.

Broughton has two public houses: the Fox and Hounds in the centre of the village, which reopened after refurbishment in October 2022 after being closed for many years, and the Bell On The Common, on the edge of the open area known as the Common. There is also a bowls club which was established in 1961, and a village hall.

== Sculptures ==
Broughton Gifford is home to a war memorial in the form of an obelisk.

== Bibliography ==
- Pevsner, Nikolaus; Cherry, Bridget (revision) (1975) [1963]. The Buildings of England: Wiltshire. Harmondsworth: Penguin Books. pp. 150–151.
