= Barnwell (surname) =

Barnwell is a surname. Notable people with the surname include:

- Angela Barnwell (1936–1965), British swimmer
- Bill Barnwell (born 1984), American sportswriter
- Brian Barnwell, American lawyer
- Charles Frederick Barnwell (1781–1849), British antiquarian and museum curator
- Chris Barnwell, (born 1979), Baseball infielder
- Edward Barnwell, (1813–1887), British antiquarian and schoolmaster
- Frank Barnwell, (1880–1938), pioneering aeronautical engineer
- Harold Barnwell, (1878–1917), Aircraft pioneer
- John Barnwell, (born 1938), British former soccer player and manager
- John Barnwell (colonist), (1671–1724), Irish emigrant to South Carolina
- John Barnwell (cricketer), (1914–1998), First-class cricketer
- John Barnwell (senator) (1748–1800), soldier and public official from South Carolina
- Juliette Walker Barnwell (died 2016), Bahamian educator and public administrator
- Malcolm Barnwell, (born 1958), American football player
- Marcia Sherlon Barnwell, Vincentian politician
- Michael Barnwell, (born 1943), First-class cricketer
- Middleton Barnwell, (1882–1957), Bishop of Idaho
- Robert Barnwell, (1761–1814), South Carolina revolutionary and statesman
- Robert Woodward Barnwell, (1801−1882), US-American politician
