= Harnwell =

Harnwell is a surname. Notable people with the surname include:

- Ben Harnwell, founder of Dignitatis Humanae Institute
- Gaylord Harnwell (1903–1982), American educator and physicist
- Jamie Harnwell (born 1977), Australian soccer player

== See also ==
- Barnwell (surname)
