= Barnwell =

Barnwell may refer to:

== People ==
- Barnwell (surname)

== Places ==
- Barnwell, Alberta, Canada
- Barnwell, California, USA
- Barnwell, Cambridgeshire, a suburb in north-east Cambridge, England
  - Barnwell Priory
- Barnwell, Northamptonshire, England
- Barnwell, South Carolina, USA

== Other uses ==
- Barnwell chronicler, the writer of thirteenth-century Latin chronicle named after the priory at Barnwell near Cambridge
- Barnwell School, Stevenage, England

== See also ==
- Banwell, Somerset, England
- Barwell, Leicestershire, England
