= Ebenezer Chapel, Melksham =

Ebenezer Chapel
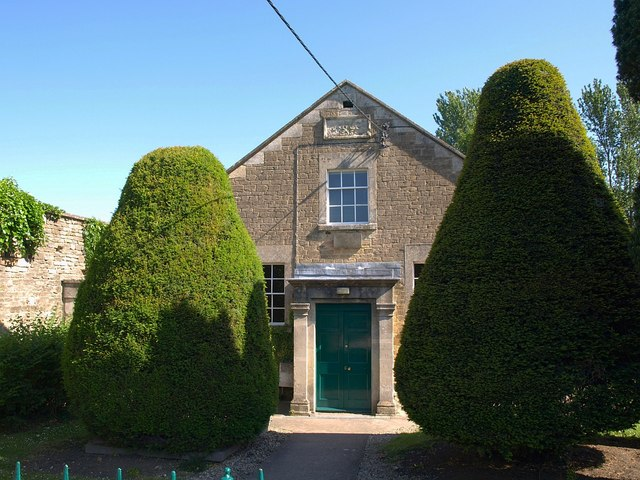
- The chapel
- Ebenezer Chapel
- 51.3753°N 2.13756°W
- OS grid reference: ST 90522 64036
- Location: Union Street, Melksham, Wiltshire
- Country: England
- Denomination: Baptist
- Website: https://www.ebenezerchurchmelksham.org/

History
- Status: chapel
- Founded: 1835

Architecture
- Completed: 1835

Listed Building – Grade II
- Reference no.: 1021748

The Ebenezer Chapel is a Baptist place of worship in the town of Melksham in the English county of Wiltshire. The chapel was built in 1835. It has been a Grade II listed building since 1985.
