= Andy Park (Mr. Christmas) =

English electrician styling himself "Mr. Christmas"

Andy Park (born 16 March 1963) is an electrician from Melksham, Wiltshire, England, who styles himself "Mr. Christmas" after claiming to have celebrated Christmas Day every day since 14 July 1993.

== Personal life ==
Over the years Park has sent himself more than 235,500 Christmas cards.

In 2005, he released a single entitled "It's Christmas Every Day", with a video featuring Mike Read and produced by Andy Whitmore.

He claims that each day he eats breakfast (turkey sandwich and mince pies), then goes to work, until returning around at lunchtime to eat a full roast turkey dinner before watching a recording of the Queen's Christmas speech, sherry in hand.

In an interview published in 2006, Park was quoted as saying that, over the previous 13 years, he had consumed 4,380 turkeys (one a day), 87,600 mince pies (20 a day), 2,190 pints of gravy (half a pint a day), 26,280 roast potatoes (six a day), 30,660 stuffing balls, 219,000 mushy peas, 4,380 bottles of champagne, 4,380 bottles of sherry and 5,000 bottles of wine. However, in 2001, he was warned by his doctor that the diet was affecting his health after his weight increased to 19 stone (270 lb; 120 kg).

Mr Christmas also sent in his song via post to The Scott Mills show on BBC Radio 1 and was opened live on air on 9 August 2018. It was played until listeners text in requesting the song to be stopped. Chris Stark and Scott Mills exchanged talks over how it could be a number one if it was recorded in a studio.

== In the media ==
On 15 December 2007, in an interview on the BBC Radio 4 programme Saturday Live, Park said he was still celebrating every day.

On 22 December 2009, he appeared on Talksport radio. He was a guest on the Ian Collins' Late Show to discuss his lifestyle.

In 2009, Park appeared in former Radio 1 DJ Mike Read's Christmas single, "My Christmas Card To You".

On 8 December 2015, Park appeared on the Channel 5 documentary Crackers about Christmas. The show explains how Park wanted his single to reach Christmas number one and he still follows his daily routine now in 2015, however, following recent reports in the Daily Mirror, he has decided to stop celebrating daily after Christmas 2015 due to wiping out his savings and being at risk of losing his home. However, after just two weeks of abstention, Park returned to celebrating every day, citing his love for the holiday being too great.
