= Melksham Town Hall =

Municipal building in Melksham, Wiltshire, England

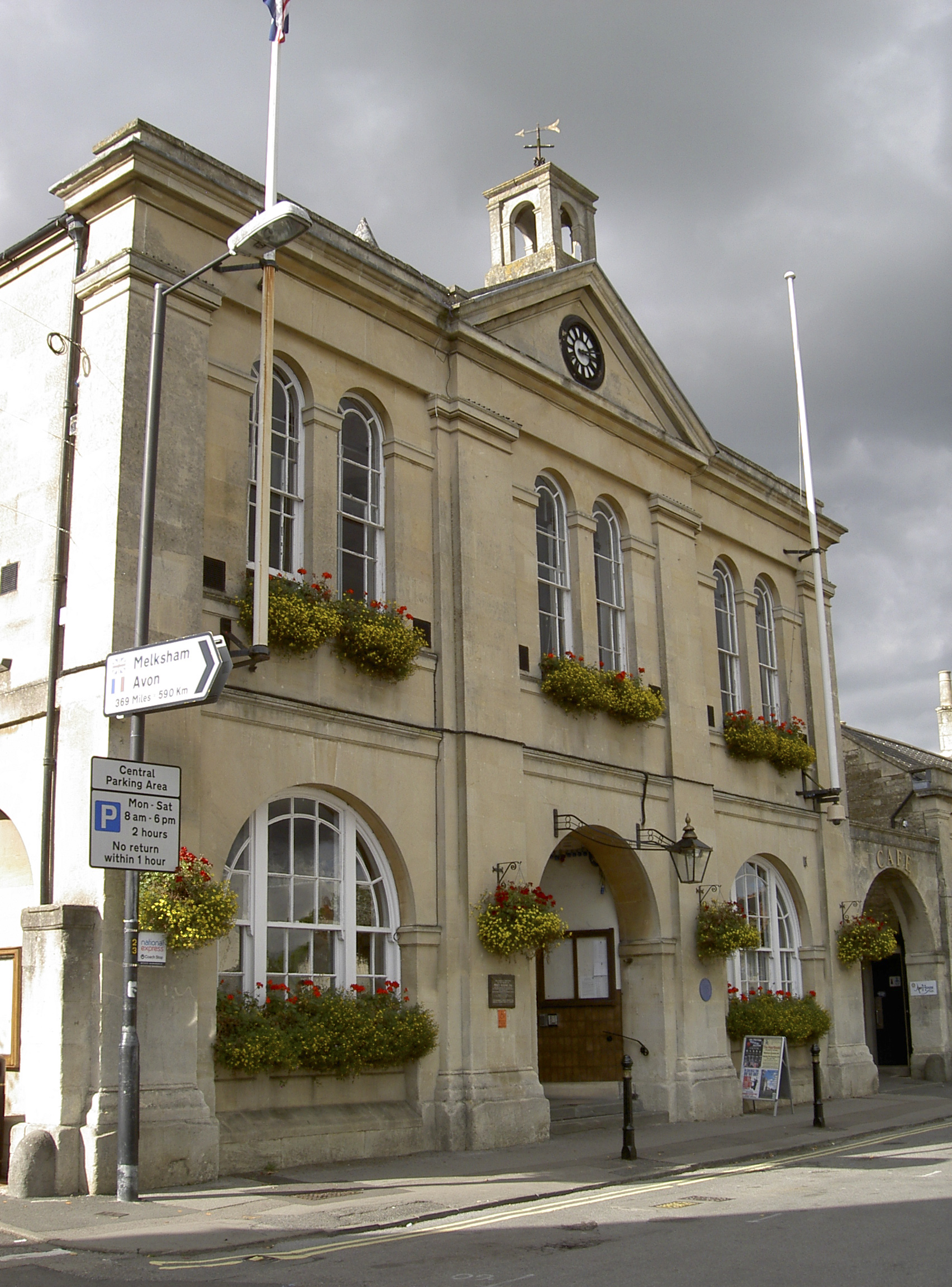
- Melksham Town Hall

- Shown in Wiltshire
- 51.3716°N 2.1388°W
- Location: Market Place, Melksham

History
- Built: 1847

Site notes
- Architect: D. Jones
- Architectural style: Italianate style

Listed Building – Grade II
- Official name: Town Hall
- Designated: 29 September 1950
- Reference no.: 1194263

Melksham Town Hall is a municipal building in the Market Place in Melksham, Wiltshire, England. The structure, which was built as a cheese market and is now the home of Melksham Town Council, is a Grade II listed building.

== History ==
The west side of the Market Place had originally formed part of the orchard of Place House, a manor house which had been erected by Henry Brouncker in the mid-16th century. His son, also named Henry Brouncker, became one of the members of parliament for Westbury in 1572, for Devizes in 1584, 1586, and 1589, and for Dorchester in 1601. The house itself was completely demolished in 1864.

The orchard site was acquired by the directors of the Melksham Market Company in 1846 as the proposed location for a cheese market. The new building was designed by D. Jones of Bradford-on-Avon in the Italianate style, built in ashlar stone at a cost of £3,350 and was completed in 1847. The design involved a symmetrical main frontage with three bays facing onto the Market Place; the central bay, which slightly projected forward, featured an opening on the ground floor flanked by full-height Doric order pilasters supporting an entablature and a pediment with a clock in the tympanum. The other bays on the ground floor originally also contained openings flanked by full-height pilasters while the bays on the first floor each contained a pair of tall round-headed windows. Pevsner was critical of the tall windows on the first floor, noting that the building was equipped "with lights so extremely elongated as pleased the forties only." There was a belfry with a weather vane at roof level, and a cheese store was erected behind the cheese market.

The horns and part of the skull of an unusually large ox, which had been recovered from the River Avon in 1838, was placed in the cheese market for safe-keeping in 1856. The building was used as a drill hall by the Melksham Volunteer Rifle Corps from 1860, leading to suspension of the cheese market. It was used as a venue for meetings of the local board and for county court hearings from 1889, and, after the Melksham Market Company was wound up in 1898, both the cheese market and the cheese store were acquired by Charles Awdry, who was treasurer of King's College Hospital as well as a Deputy Lieutenant of Wiltshire.

After significant population growth, largely associated with Melksham's status as a market town, the area became an urban district in 1894. By 1907 the cheese store was being used as a drill hall by a detachment of B Squadron, the Royal Wiltshire Yeomanry and, in 1911, the suffragettes, Annie Kenney and Mildred Mansel gave a speech in support of women's suffrage there. In 1914, the new council decided to acquire both buildings and to convert the cheese market into a town hall and the cheese store into an assembly hall. The conversion of the cheese market included the insertion of Diocletian windows into two of the openings on the ground floor. Internally, the principal rooms are a committee room on the ground floor, with fine oak panelling, and a council chamber on the first floor, lit by the tall windows.

The assembly hall at the rear was subsequently converted to an events venue, where performers have included rock bands Mungo Jerry, in April 1971, and Thin Lizzy, in March 1972. The town hall continued to serve as the headquarters of the urban district council for much of the 20th century but ceased to be the local seat of government after the enlarged West Wiltshire District Council was formed in 1974. It subsequently became the offices and meeting place of Melksham Town Council.

To the right of the former cheese market and linked to it by an arch matching the three round-headed openings is a smaller two-storey building, in matching ashlar and completed in the same year, 1847. This was at one time the town's fire brigade headquarters, and has been used as offices since at least 1985.
