= Warminster Journal =

Weekly newspaper in Warminster, England

- Type: Weekly newspaper
- Format: Tabloid
- Owner(s): Coates & Parker Ltd
- Founded: 1881
- Headquarters: Warminster
- Circulation: unaudited
- Website: www.warminsterjournal.co.uk

The Warminster Journal is a weekly newspaper published in Warminster, Wiltshire in South West England. The paper serves the west Wiltshire towns of Warminster and Westbury as well as the villages of the Wylye Valley, Chitterne, Mere, Chapmanslade, Corsley, and Horningsham.

== History ==
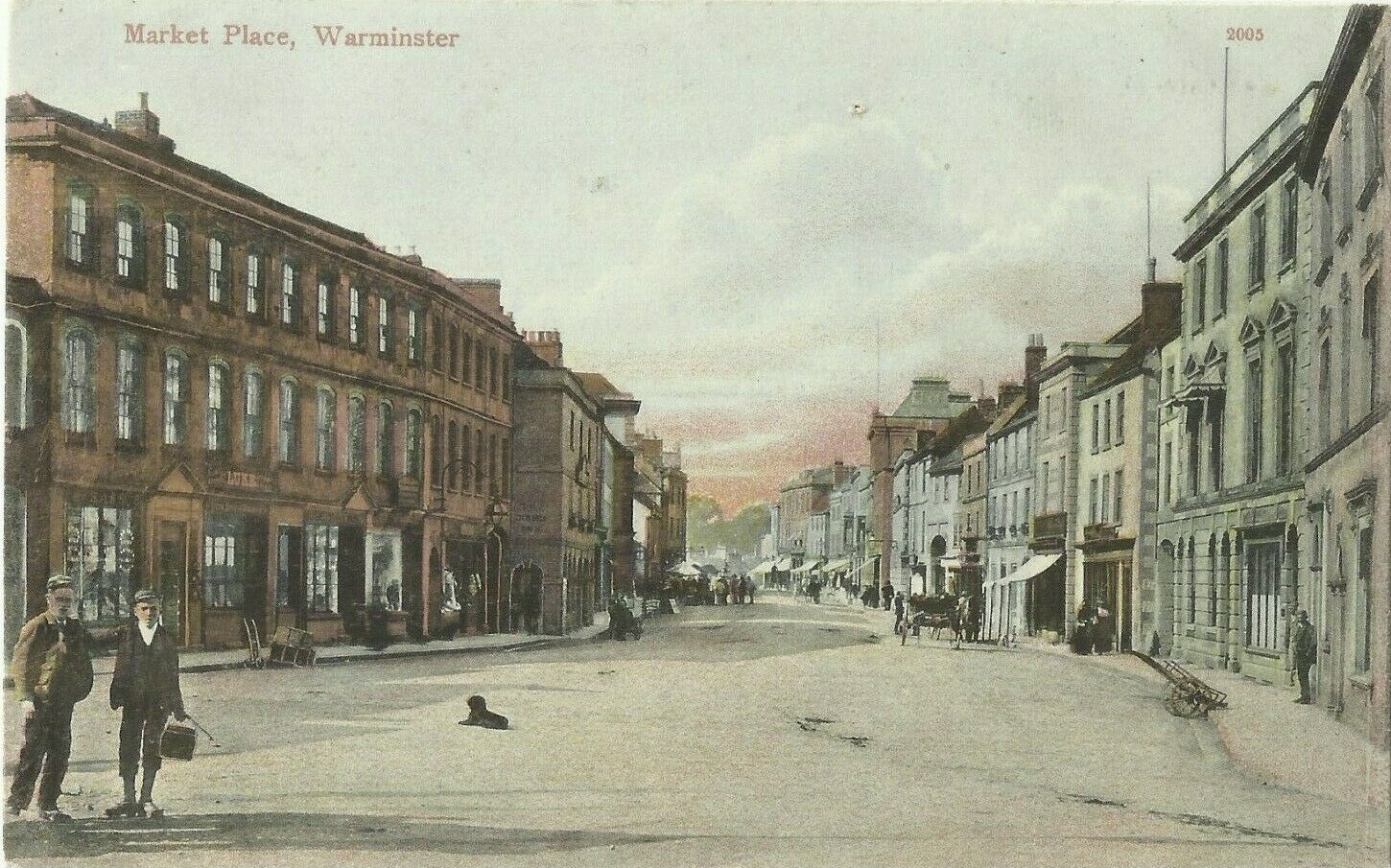
Market Place, Warminster, published by Alfred Coates c. 1905

The newspaper's founder, Benjamin Walter Coates, was a son of the Rev. John Coates, master of King James's School, Almondbury. B. W. Coates moved to Warminster in the 1860s and in 1876 bought an existing printing and stationery business. Coates was interested in running a newspaper, but Warminster already had the Warminster Herald, founded in 1857.

A Conservative and a loyal member of the Church of England, in 1881 Coates finally launched the Warminster and Westbury Journal and Wilts County Advertiser as a weekly broadsheet, after a substantial investment in new staff and machinery. The first issue was dated Saturday 19 November 1881, and for twelve years the new paper was in competition with the Warminster Herald. In 1884, both newspapers were published weekly and priced at one penny, and the Journal was noted as having a Conservative affiliation, while the Herald was non-aligned. The Herald ceased publication in 1893. Coates retired as editor in 1898 and was succeeded by his 28-year-old younger son Alfred Coates, who edited the Journal for sixty years. In 1900, Samuel Hillier Parker, originally from Sunderland, joined the firm as an assistant. When he married in 1903, he gave his occupation as bookseller’s assistant. In 1912, Alfred Coates made him a partner. Apart from a single year beginning during the First World War, the paper has appeared weekly since 1881. Due to key staff leaving to join the armed forces, publication was suspended in April 1918 and did not begin again until 15 August 1919. However, the firm's business as stationers continued.

The issue of the Journal of 4 July 1903 announced a forthcoming one-night visit to Westbury by Buffalo Bill's show "Wild West and Rough Riders of the World". The paper of 18 July 1903 said this was due to Westbury's improved railway service.

Samuel Parker died in 1935, and Alfred Coates continued the newspaper, printing and stationery business until 1958, when he retired, selling Coates & Parker to Charlie Mills. Mills died in 1970, leaving the business to his wife and daughter, Elsie and Gladys Mills. In 2021, his grandchildren Ray Shorto and Diana Watkins were joint editors of the newspaper.

The circulation was stated in 1989 as 5,600.

In December 2024, the paper ceased publication, then was sold to Wiltshire Publications who stated "The company is hoping to resume publishing the Warminster Journal in March".
