= Wiltshire Publications =

Wiltshire Publications Ltd is a family-owned newspaper publisher with titles in west Wiltshire and east Somerset, England. It owns the Melksham Independent News in Melksham, White Horse News in Westbury, Frome Times in Frome and Warminster Journal in Warminster.

== Operations ==
From August 2000, Wiltshire Publications printed its own newspapers after the purchase of an L&M Pacer/Linonews web offset press. A commercial printing division was set up, offering commercial printing of newspapers and other publications. As well as newspaper printing, Wiltshire Publications has undertaken commercial printing for a local supermarket group, electoral addresses for political parties and wrapping paper for a fish and chip outlet. Currently (January 2025) their newspapers are printed by Mortons of Horncastle.

=== Newspapers ===
The White Horse News covers Westbury and the surrounding area. As of 2018, 10,000 copies are distributed every fortnight in Westbury and the surrounding villages – Bratton, Dilton Marsh, Hawkeridge, Heywood, Westbury Leigh and Erlestoke. It has the largest circulation of any newspaper in the Westbury area, and is the only newspaper delivered to houses in the surrounding villages.

The Frome Times covers the Somerset town of Frome. Over 13,400 copies are distributed fortnightly in the town and it has the largest circulation of any Frome newspaper.

The Melksham Independent News covers Melksham and the surrounding villages. The paper was printed for the first time on 2 April 1981 under the Melksham News title. It was run by Ian and Susan Drew until July 1987 when they sold the business. By 1990, Melksham News had ceased to trade and the Drews decided to return to Wiltshire and resurrect the paper, which was renamed Melksham Independent News. In 1996 and 2011, the newspaper received a Civic Award from Melksham Town Council for services to the community. As of 2018, 13,700 copies are distributed every fortnight – the largest circulation of any newspaper in the Melksham area.

In January 2025, the company acquired the Warminster Journal from Coates & Parker Ltd.
