= Melksham Oak Community School =

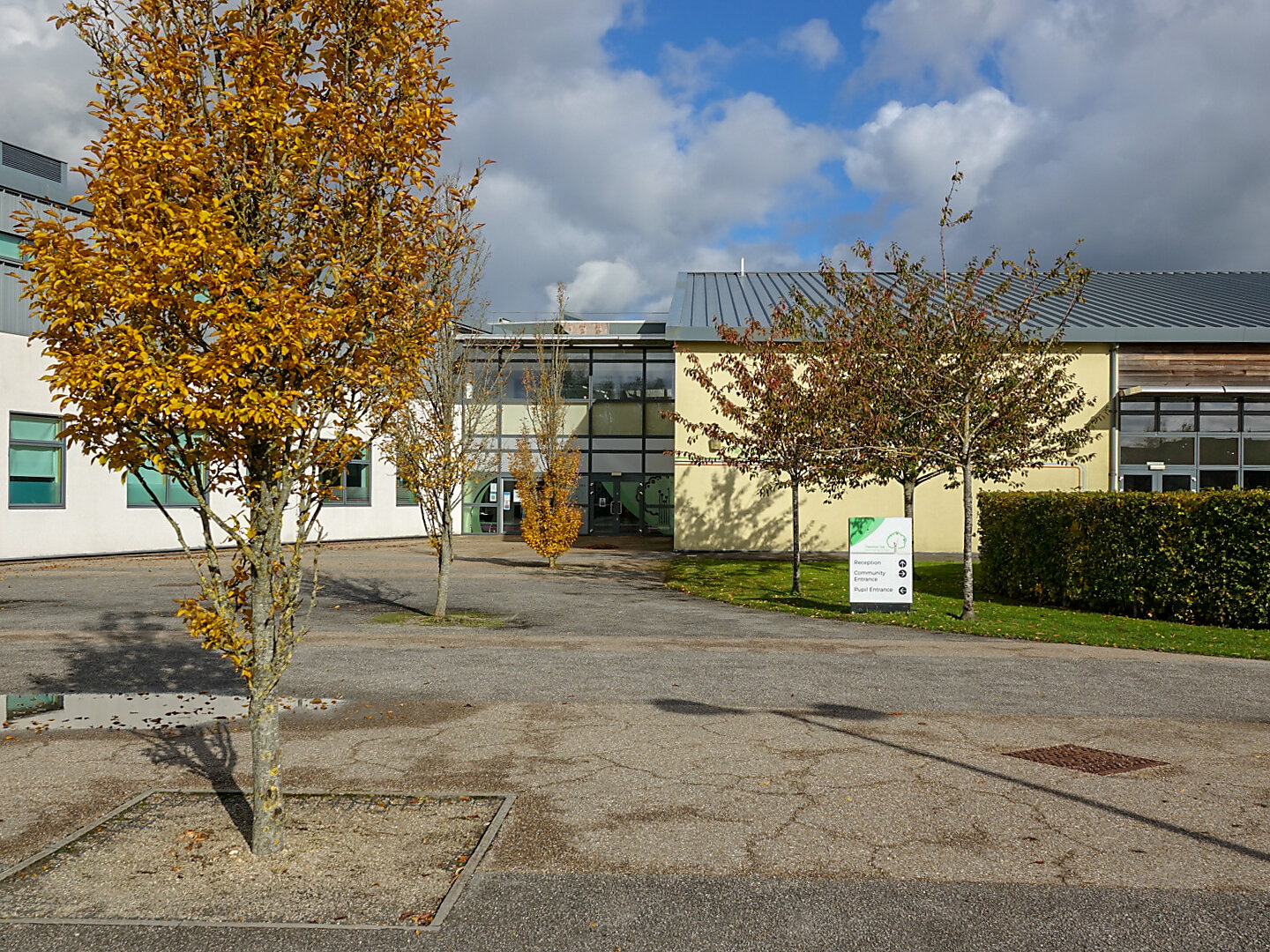

Location
- Bowerhill; Melksham, Wiltshire, SN12 6QZ; England; 51°21′37″N 2°07′06″W

Information
- Type: Academy
- Motto: Raising Aspirations, Learning for Life, Success for All
- Established: 2010
- Local authority: Wiltshire Council
- Department for Education URN: 146344 Tables
- Ofsted: Reports
- Headteacher: David Cooper
- Gender: Mixed
- Age: 11 to 18
- Enrolment: 1,282 (February 2024)
- Houses: Wellington, Hurricane, Lancaster, Spitfire
- Website: www.melkshamoak.wilts.sch.uk

Melksham Oak Community School is a mixed secondary school and sixth form in the south-east outskirts of Melksham, Wiltshire, England, for students aged 11 to 18.

== History ==
The school opened on 12 July 2010, having been created under the Building Schools for the Future programme to replace The George Ward Technology College.

At first a community school administered by Wiltshire Council, Melksham Oak Community School converted to academy status in April 2015. The school continues to coordinate with Wiltshire Council for admissions.

In August 2018, the school became part of the White Horse Federation (TWHF), a multi-academy trust which runs primary and secondary schools in Wiltshire, Berkshire, Oxfordshire and Gloucestershire.

In October 2022, Melksham Oak attained an Ofsted rating of "Good", improving upon its previous "Requires Improvement" rating in April 2017.

In April 2024, TWHF dismissed all of the school's governors without warning and replaced them with a smaller Interim Academy Board, explaining that "Melksham Oak is on an improvement journey and TWHF recognised that Melksham Oak needed an updated transition plan." Later the same month, TWHF announced that the school's head-teacher, Haris Hussain, was to "move to another role", and the head of Devizes School, David Cooper, would become the executive headteacher of both schools. Cooper commented "By working together, we can achieve greater than the sum of our parts".

== House system ==
Melksham Oak's house system was established in 2013 and consisted of four houses: Sirius (green ), Castor (yellow), Polaris (blue) and Omega (red).

In September 2022, Melksham Oak's house system was reformed. It still consists of four houses: Wellington (blue), Hurricane (yellow), Lancaster (green) and Spitfire (red), all named after RAF aircraft. The names were first voted on by the students, with the teachers and student council voting from the choices with the highest vote tally. With the new house system, more emphasis was put on the houses. Every week, points are awarded in teamwork-based house competitions on Fridays. A flagpole in the playground flies the flag of the house that is leading in points that week. The house challenges culminate in the summer with the school's annual sports day, which is another opportunity to win points.

== Uniform ==
Melksham Oak's School uniform consists of a white collared shirt, a navy V-neck with the school's logo, a navy, yellow, black and white striped tie, black formal trousers or a black knee-length skirt and black formal shoes made of a leather or faux leather material. Skirts must be worn with black or navy tights.

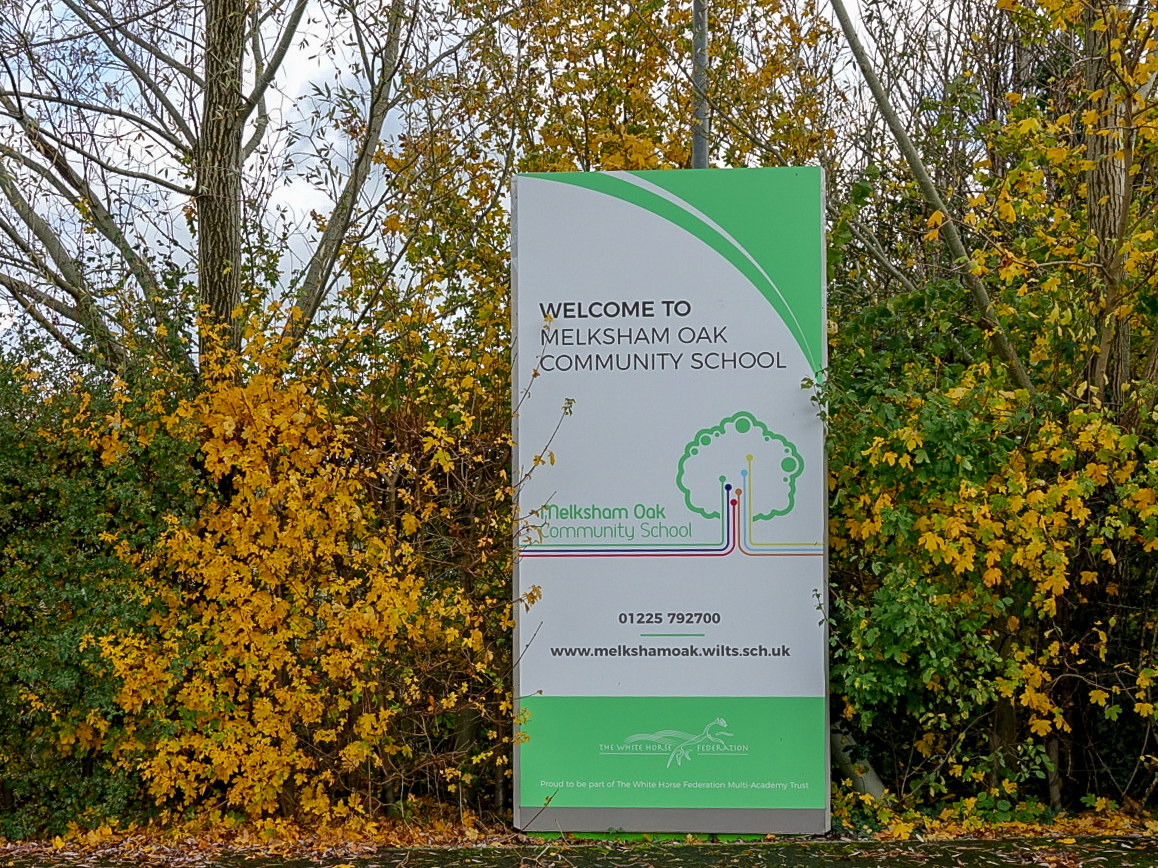
School sign with logo
