= St Michael's Church, Melksham =

St Michael's, Melksham
- Church of St Michael and All Angels
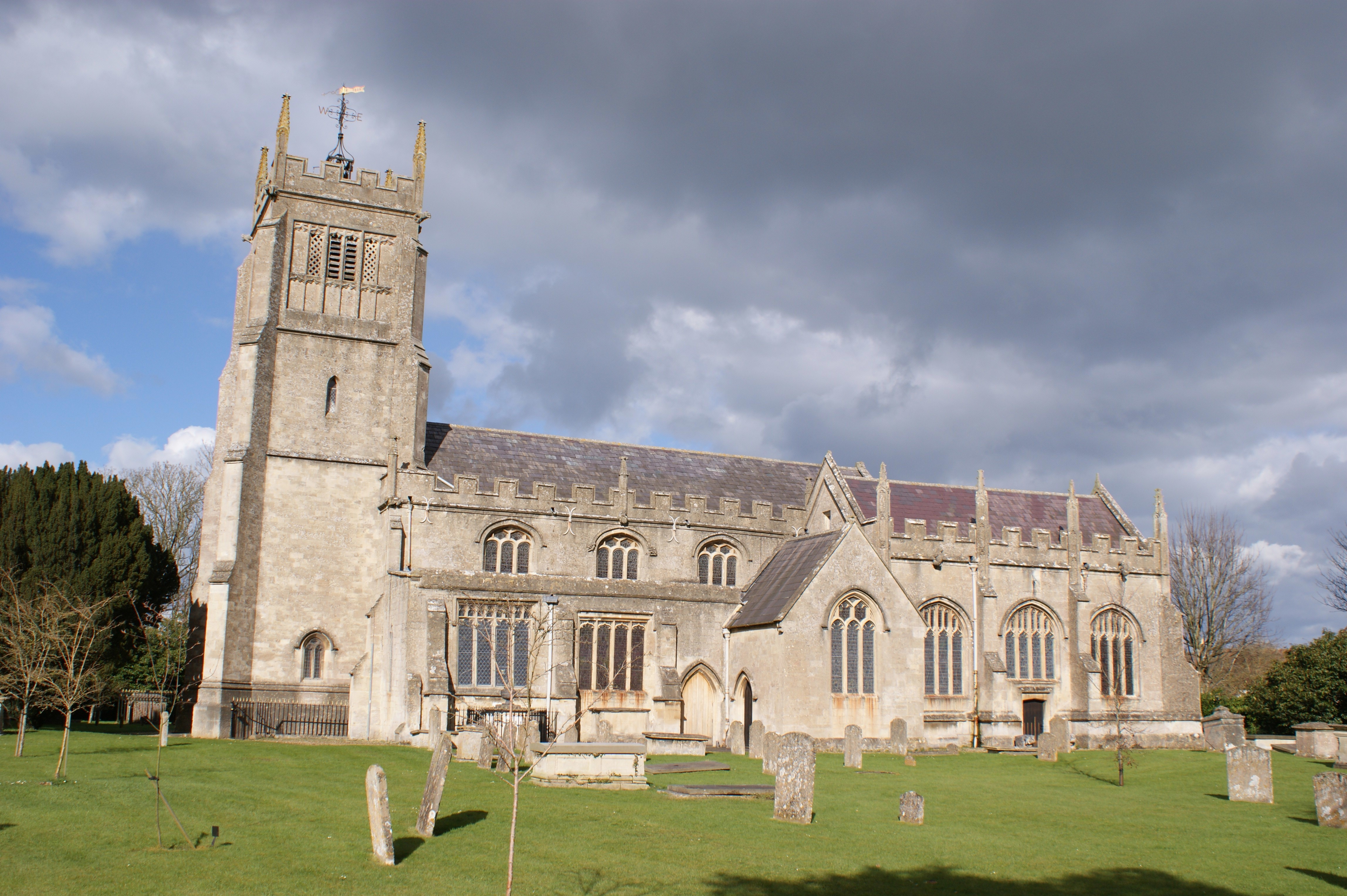

- Location in Wiltshire
- 51.3726°N 2.1409°W
- OS grid reference: ST 90288 63732
- Location: Melksham, Wiltshire
- Country: England
- Denomination: Anglican
- Website: www.melksham.church

History
- Status: Parish church

Architecture
- Functional status: Active
- Style: Perpendicular
- Years built: 12th, 14th–16th centuries, 1845

Administration
- Province: Canterbury
- Diocese: Salisbury
- Archdeaconry: Wilts
- Deanery: Bradford on Avon
- Parish: Melksham

Clergy
- Rector: Rev Charlie Thomson

Listed Building – Grade II*
- Reference no.: 1021707

St Michael's Church is the Church of England parish church in the town of Melksham, Wiltshire, England.

The church stands some 200 metres northwest of the town's marketplace. With 12th-century origins, the building was altered and enlarged in the 14th and 15th centuries, and restored in the 19th. It is a Grade II* listed building.

== History ==
The Domesday Book in 1086 recorded a church at Melchesha. In 1220 the living became a possession of the canonry of Salisbury Cathedral, continuing to the present day.

== Architecture ==
The church has a chancel and five-bay nave, with north and south aisles and north and south chapels, and a west tower.

Pevsner wrote: "... it is a big church, and so it is all the more remarkable that its Norman predecessor was just as big." The chancel dates from the 12th century, evidenced externally by a string course decorated with cylindrical billet, and internally by the outlines of decorative arcades on the north and south walls, together with a remnant of an arch in the northeast corner.

The church was enlarged in the 14th century, and in the mid-15th a clerestory was inserted and a chapel was added on the south side of the chancel. The Lady Chapel was built later that century at the east end of the south aisle, and was linked to the holders of Melksham manor, at that time the Brounckers; in the 13th century the manor had been granted to Amesbury Abbey. The chapel was refitted in 1909.

Extensive remodelling in 1845 by T.H. Wyatt included moving the four-stage 16th-century tower from the crossing to the west end, and adding a vestry and chapel on the north side. In 1881 the chancel was restored. The fine carved limestone reredos of 1894 is by C.E. Ponting, and the carved oak chancel screen is of the same date. Stained glass in the nave and chancel is by Ward and Hughes, 1884, and the Lady Chapel has glass of 1897 by Kempe.

The tower carries ten bells. Eight were recast by John Taylor & Co in 1924, and two were added in 2026.

== Churchyard ==
A chest tomb from the early 19th century is Grade II* listed; many further tombs and memorials are Grade II listed.

== Parish ==
From the 13th century, chapelries of Melksham were at Seend and Erlestoke, the latter some seven miles distant; for a short time from the 14th century there was another at Shaw. Each of these places gained their own parishes in the 19th century.

Chapels of ease were built in the northern Forest area of Melksham (St Andrew, 1876) and at Beanacre, now in Melksham Without civil parish (St Barnabas, 1886; the 14th-century stone font came from St Michael's). Today these two churches, together with St Michael's, are served by the Melksham Team Ministry.

In 1954, the southernmost part of Melksham parish, namely the area south of the Devizes branch line, was transferred to the parish of Steeple Ashton with Semington.

== Notable clergy ==
- Bohun Fox, vicar 1697–1750, author of two anti-Quaker pamphlets (1707); founded and endowed a school for poor boys. His charity continued beyond 1953 but is no longer extant.
- Robert Martineau, curate 1938–1941, later Bishop of Huntingdon and Bishop of Blackburn
- Hugh Dickinson, curate c.1957, later Dean of Salisbury
