= Edward Barnwell =

British antiquarian and schoolmaster

Rev. Edward Lowry Barnwell
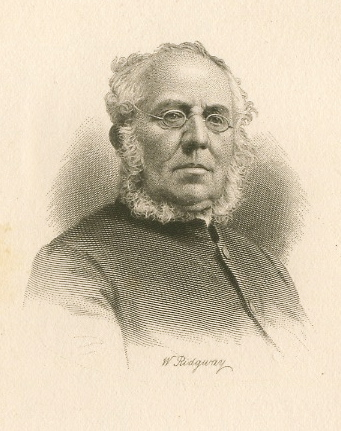
- Born: 1813
- Died: 9 August 1887; Melksham, Wiltshire
- Education: Bath Grammar School; Dr Charles Burney’s Academy; Balliol College, Oxford; Jesus College, Oxford
- Scientific career
- Fields: Archaeology; Medieval architecture; History of Wales
- Workplaces: Headmaster Ruthin School

Edward Lowry Barnwell (1813 – 9 August 1887) was a British antiquarian and schoolmaster who was headmaster of Ruthin School, Denbighshire for 26 years.

== Life ==
Edward Barnwell was the third son of Charles Frederick Barnwell, a former Fellow of Caius College, Cambridge. His father was descended from the Barnwells of Mileham, Norfolk. His mother was the daughter of Rev. John Lowry, Rector of Clogherny in County Tyrone and had connections with the Irish aristocracy and the Perrot family of Herefordshire. He was educated at Bath Grammar School and then in a school at Greenwich which had been established by Dr Charles Burney. He went up to Balliol College, Oxford and gained a first class degree in Mathematics.

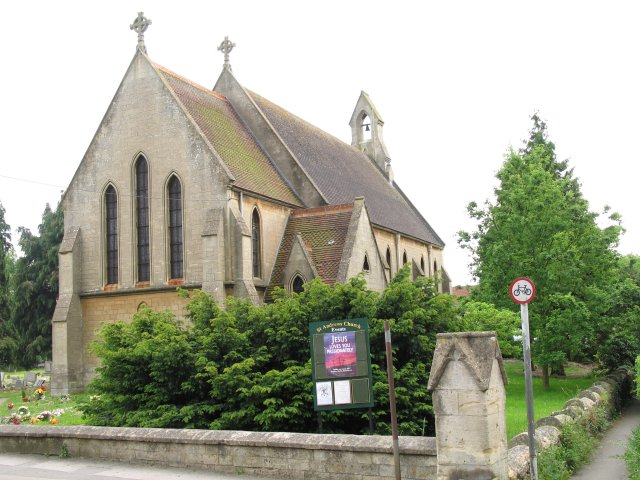
St Andrews Church, Melksham Forest, financed by the Rev E L Barnwell

In 1836 he was awarded a Scholarship at Jesus College, Oxford and was ordained by the Bishop of Oxford, before becoming a curate at Malvern. He was appointed headmaster of Dean Goodman’s Ruthin School in 1839. In 1846 Barnwell married Matilda, daughter of the Rev C J Chapman, of St Peter Mancroft Norwich. Barnwell was headmaster of Ruthin School for 26 years and retired in 1865. In 1866 he purchased Melksham House in Melksham, Wiltshire. In the Forest area of that town he financed a new church, St Andrew’s, and contributed towards the cost of a new rectory and parish school.

== Cambrian Archaeological Association ==
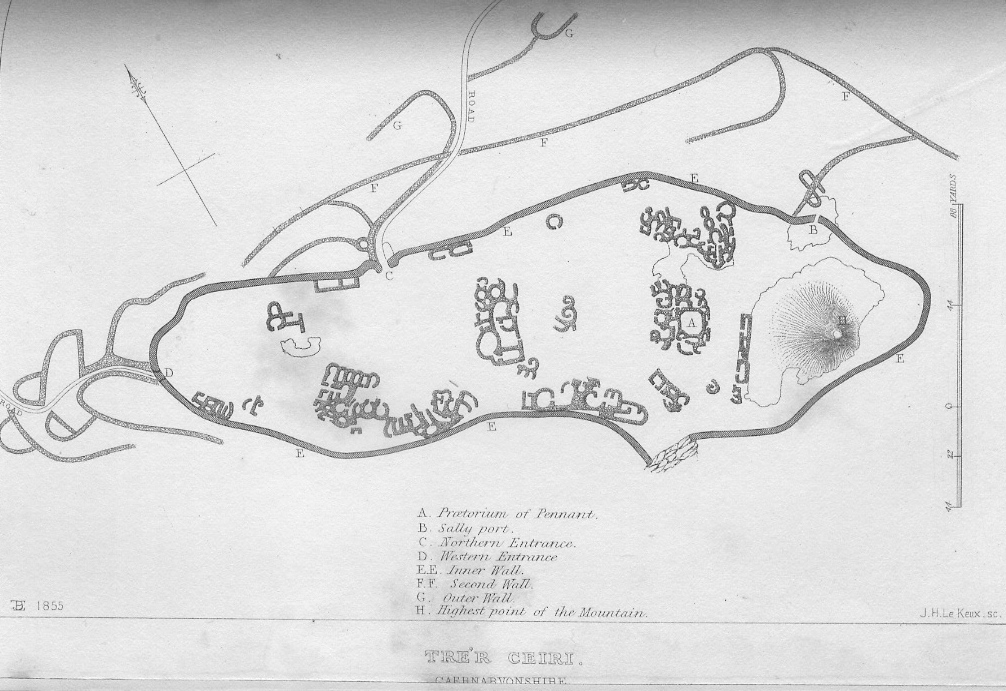
Barnwell's survey of Tre'r Ceiri, Caernarfonshire. Arch Camb Vol 2 1872 pg21

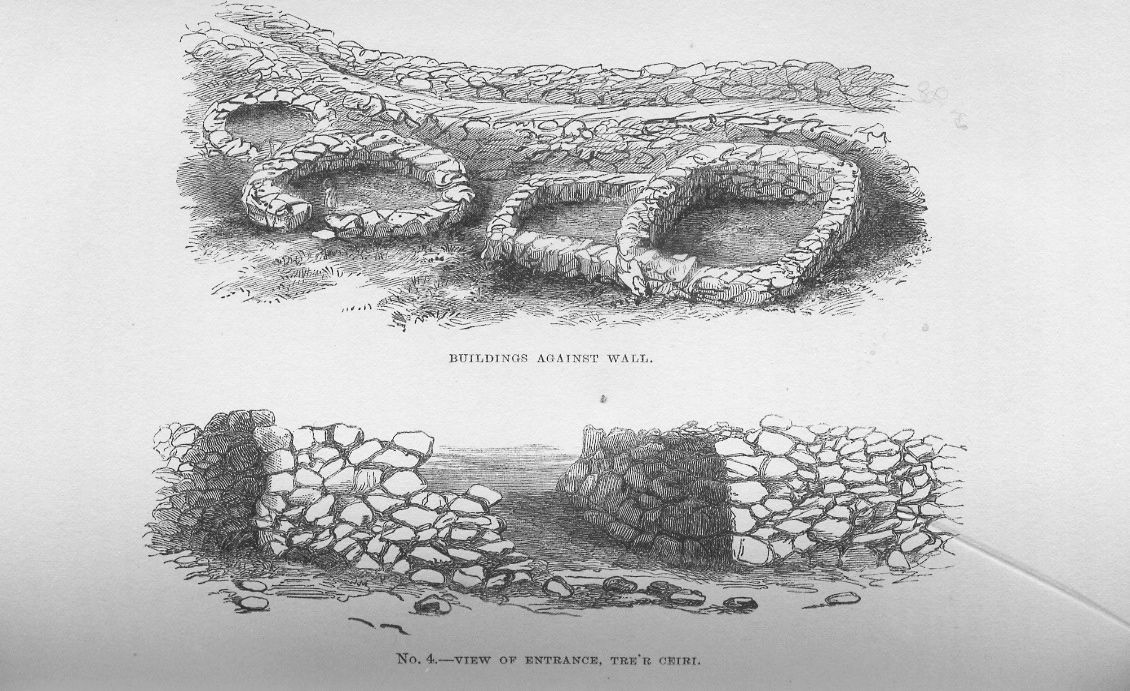
Stone Hut circles at Tre'r Ceiri. Arch Camb Vol 2 1872 21

Barnwell was a founding member of the Cambrian Archaeological Association at the Aberystwyth meeting in 1847. He served as the joint general secretary from 1855 to 1875, and as Treasurer from 1875 to 1884; in that year he was made a Vice President of the Society in recognition of his long service. Between 1855 and 1884 he contributed 102 articles and notes on a wide range of subjects to Archaeologia Cambrensis.

His main interests were archaeology, vernacular architecture, medieval history and genealogy. He had a particular interest in prehistory and can be seen as a founding figure in the study of Welsh Prehistory. His last article in Archaeologia Cambrensis "On Some South Wales Cromlechs" disputed some of the assertions in Ferguson's recently published "Rude Stone Monuments of all Countries" and provided an overview of chambered tombs in Wales. He collected artefacts and he was an expert on Bronze Age metalwork, publishing a number of hoards including that from Guilsfield in Montgomeryshire. He also published a general survey of the early finds in Montgomeryshire which was included in the Proceedings of the Powysland Club. His survey of the late Iron Age site at Tre’r Ceiri, near Nefyn in Caernarfonshire, provides useful information about the state of the site at that time.

== Publications ==
Published in Archaeologia Cambrensis

- 1855 "Remarks on an Iron Celt found on the Berwyn Mountains, Merionethshire", Vol 1 p. 150.
- 1856 "Records of the Lordship of Dyffryn Clwyd and Ruthin Castle"
- 1859 "Roman Roads in Denbighshire"
- 1864 "Bronze Implements"
- 1867 "Domestic Architecture of South Wales", Vol 13, pp. 193, 163.
- 1869 "Cromlechs in North Wales", Vol 15, pp. 118-
- 1871 "Tre’r Ceiri", 5th Ser Vol 1, p. 66
- 1872 "Some details of the Broadwood Find"
- 1874 "French Megalithic Remains"
- 1875 "The Rhosnesney Bronze Implements"
- 1875 "The Pembrokeshire Cliff Castles"
- 1875 "The Caergwrle Cup"
- 1877 "Pembrokeshire Houses"
- 1884 "On Some South Wales Cromlechs"
