= Melksham =

Town in Wiltshire, England

Coordinates: 51.371°N 2.138°W

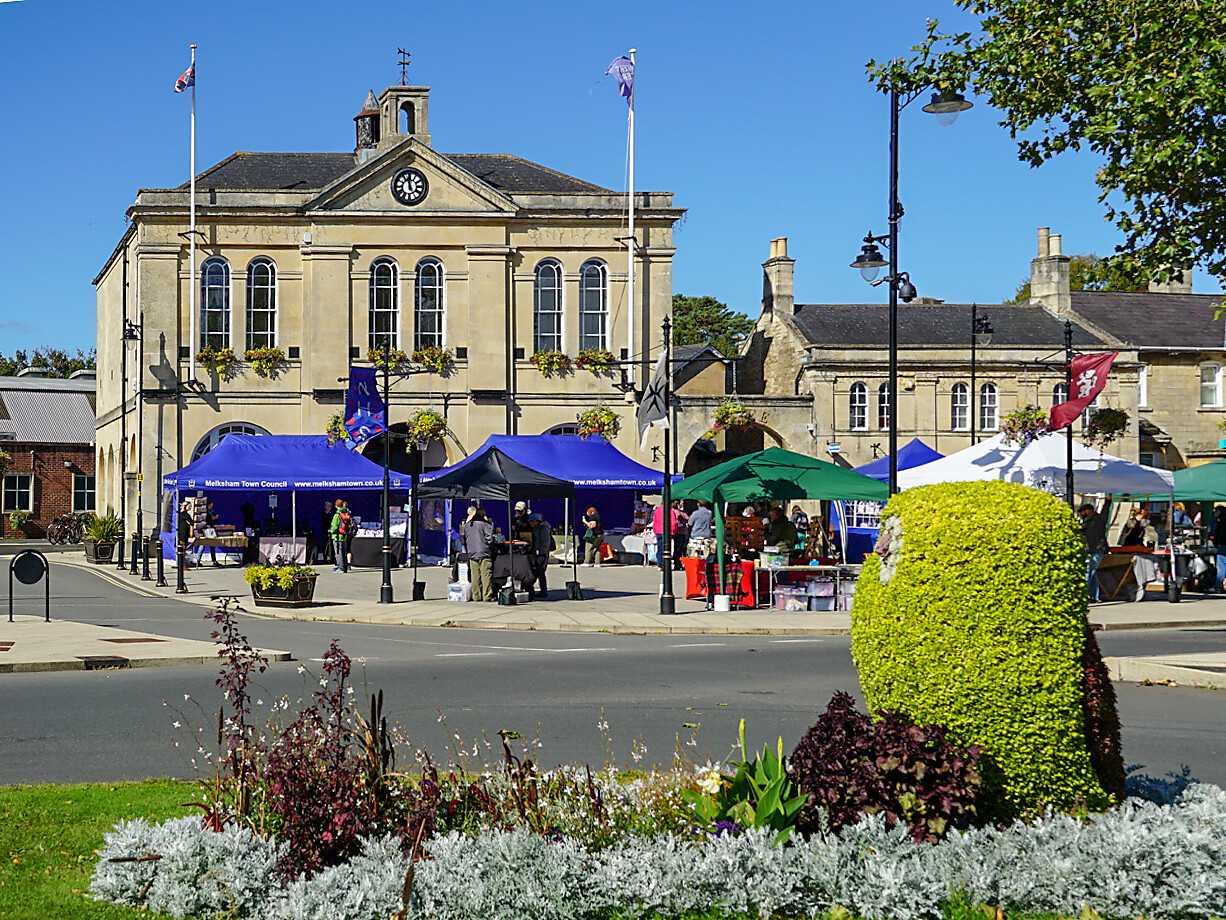
- Melksham Town Hall and marketplace

- Location within Wiltshire
- Population: 18,113 (2021)
- OS grid reference: ST9063
- Civil parish: Melksham
- Unitary authority: Wiltshire
- Ceremonial county: Wiltshire
- Region: South West
- Country: England
- Sovereign state: United Kingdom
- Post town: Melksham
- Postcode district: SN12
- Dialling code: 01225
- Police: Wiltshire
- Fire: Dorset and Wiltshire
- Ambulance: South Western
- UK Parliament: Melksham and Devizes
- Website: www.melkshamtown.co.uk

Melksham (/ˈmɛlkʃəm/) is a town and civil parish on the River Avon in Wiltshire, England, about 4.5 miles (7 km) northeast of Trowbridge and 6 miles (10 km) south of Chippenham. The parish population was 18,113 at the 2021 census.

== History ==
=== Early history ===
Excavations in 2021 in the grounds of Melksham House found fragments of locally made pottery from the early Iron Age (7th to 4th centuries BC). There is evidence of settlement continuing into the later Iron Age and Roman periods, including Roman clay roof tiles.

Melksham developed at a ford across the River Avon. The name is presumed to derive from "meolc", the Old English for milk, and "ham", a village. On John Speed's map of Wiltshire (1611), the name is spelt both Melkesam (for the hundred) and Milsham (for the town itself).

Melksham is also the name of the Royal forest that occupied the surrounding of the area in the Middle Ages.

=== Landowners ===
In 1268, Henry III of England gave the manor of Melksham to Amesbury Abbey for the souls of his late cousins Eleanor, Fair Maid of Brittany and Arthur I, Duke of Brittany.

In 1539 the prioress and nuns of Amesbury surrendered to the king their Melksham estates, which they had held for some 250 years. This property, which consisted of the lordship of the manor and hundred, was in 1541 granted to Sir Thomas Seymour. He then sold it to Henry Brouncker, who also had lands nearby at Erlestoke. At some uncertain date, perhaps about 1550, Brouncker built a residence for himself near Melksham church on the site of an earlier mansion. This was known as Place House.

Three generations of the family lived here: Henry Brouncker the founder, (d.1569), his son, Sir William, and his grandson Henry. On the death of this last Henry, about 1600, it became manifest that the Brouncker estate was heavily encumbered, and in the course of the next twenty or thirty years, all the property was alienated with the exception of Erlestoke, where William Brouncker, the heir, retired with his wife Anne, daughter of Sir John Dauntesey. Meanwhile, Place House was occupied for ten or eleven years by Henry Brouncker's widow and her second husband, Ambrose Dauntesey. After their death, in 1612, the house apparently was occupied by the steward, and afterwards it was conveyed to Sir John Danvers, who married into the family, in 1634. Danvers died in 1655 and the lordship of Melksham passed to his son, who then conveyed the estate to Walter Long the Younger, of Whaddon. The lordship remained in the Long family, who were descended from the first Henry Brouncker, until the early part of the 20th century, having passed to the 1st Viscount Long of Wraxall.

=== Melksham Bank ===
An announcement was made in the Bath Chronicle in June 1792 of the establishment of the Melksham Bank by the firm of Awdry, Long & Bruges. In November 1813 the misquoting of part of an advertisement in two London newspapers caused panic amongst the bank customers, many of whom quickly withdrew their money, reportedly causing "some bustle" among the partners of the bank. There was further trouble in 1812, when the bank was listed on a Parliamentary Paper of the House of Commons under the title "Country Banks Becoming Bankrupt".

Moule's bank became the North Wilts Banking Company in 1835, which merged in 1877 to form Capital and Counties Bank. The latter developed a nationwide branch network and was taken over by Lloyds Bank in 1918.

=== Masonic Lodge ===
The Chaloner Lodge of Freemasons (no.2644) was named after its first Worshipful Master Richard Godolphin Walmesley Chaloner, 1st Baron Gisborough, who, when not in London, resided at Melksham House. He was the brother of the 1st Viscount Long. The lodge was consecrated on 27 February 1897, with the first meeting scheduled for 4 pm 19 March, held at the town hall. Writing from London while attending his Parliamentary duties as MP for Westbury, he complained that this date was inconvenient due to his having to be at Melton Mowbray to ride in the House of Commons point to point steeplechase the next day. Despite this, the meeting went ahead and Chaloner initiated 13 of the candidates, returning to London overnight by train, getting virtually no sleep before his ride in the steeplechase early the next morning, resulting in him twice falling heavily from his horse. Later while deciding what extra furniture the lodge required, he asked that he have a special footstool, as his chair was high and his feet "dangled unpleasantly".

=== The Spa ===
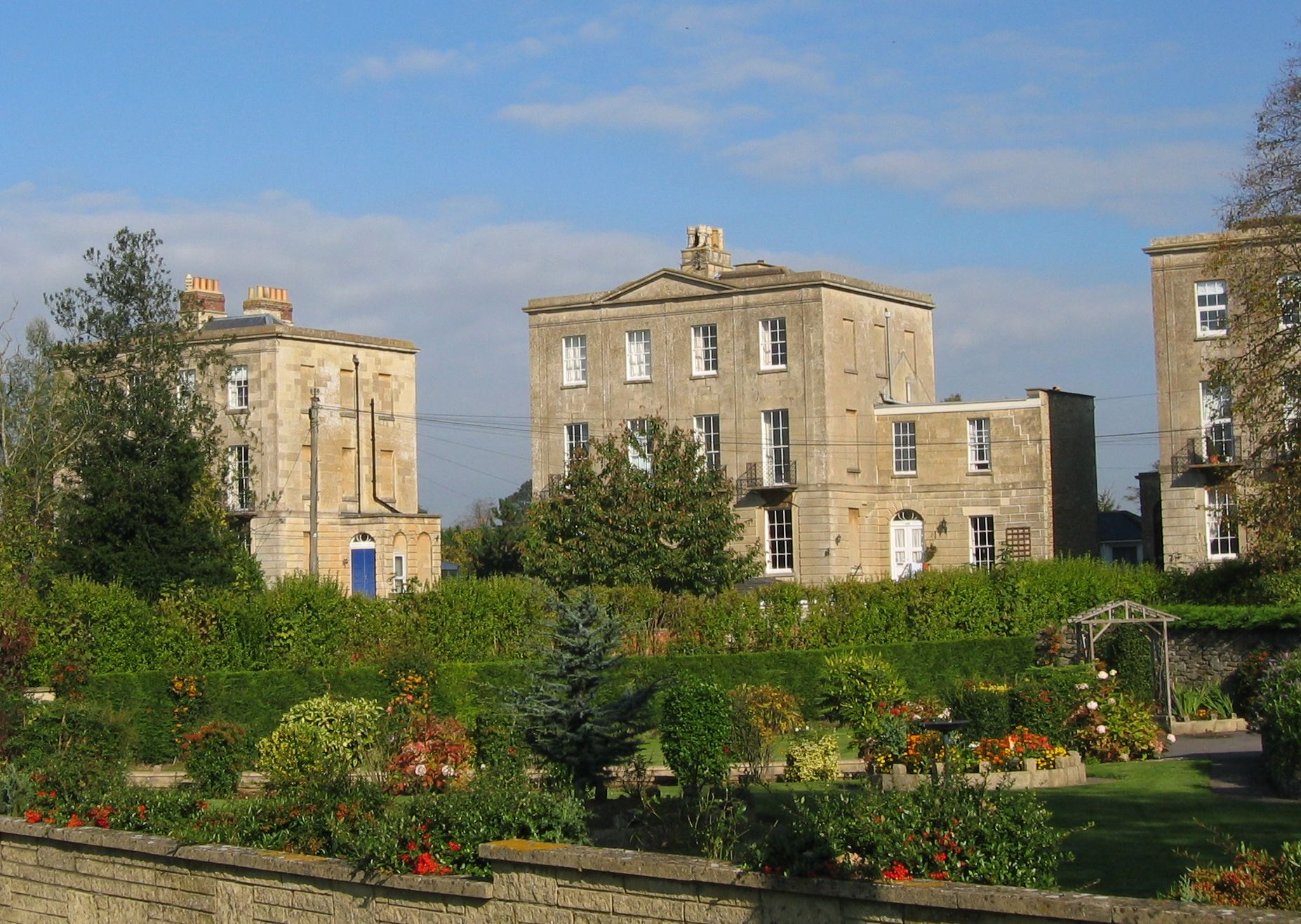
The Spa features large stone lodging houses

In 1815 the Melksham Spa Company was formed by a group of 'respectable gentlemen', with names such as Methuen, Long and others, all of whom had done very well from the now declining textile industry. Their aim was to promote a spa, after abortive attempts to find coal had uncovered two springs. As a consequence they built six large three-storeyed, semi-detached lodging houses forming a crescent, a pump room and hot and cold private baths. This suburban area at the southern end of the town is now known as The Spa, belonging to the civil parish of Melksham Without. A plan for a similar crescent on the north side never materialised. Simultaneously an Act was obtained to 'improve the pleasing town of Melksham' by paving and improving its footways and cleansing, lighting and watching the streets. The spa was not as successful as had been hoped, due in part to the popularity of the waters at nearby Bath.

== Buildings and structures ==
There are two Grade II* listed structures in the parish: St Michael's Church and one of the chest tombs in its churchyard.

Pevsner wrote that "the only rewarding part of Melksham is by the church". Melksham House, south of the church, is early 18th century but largely rebuilt after a 1920 fire and adapted for use as a sports and social club. Southwest of the church, a 15th-century tithe barn was remodelled into a school by G. E. Street in 1878; the school left the premises in 1973 and the building is now residential.

The area around Canon Square, north of the church, has several Grade II listed houses and cottages, among them a former vicarage dating from the late 17th century, remodelled in 1877 by Street and now divided into two residences. There is also a small two-storey roundhouse, built in the late 18th century for the wool industry.

The town's four-span bridge over the Avon is from the late 18th century.

== Religious sites ==
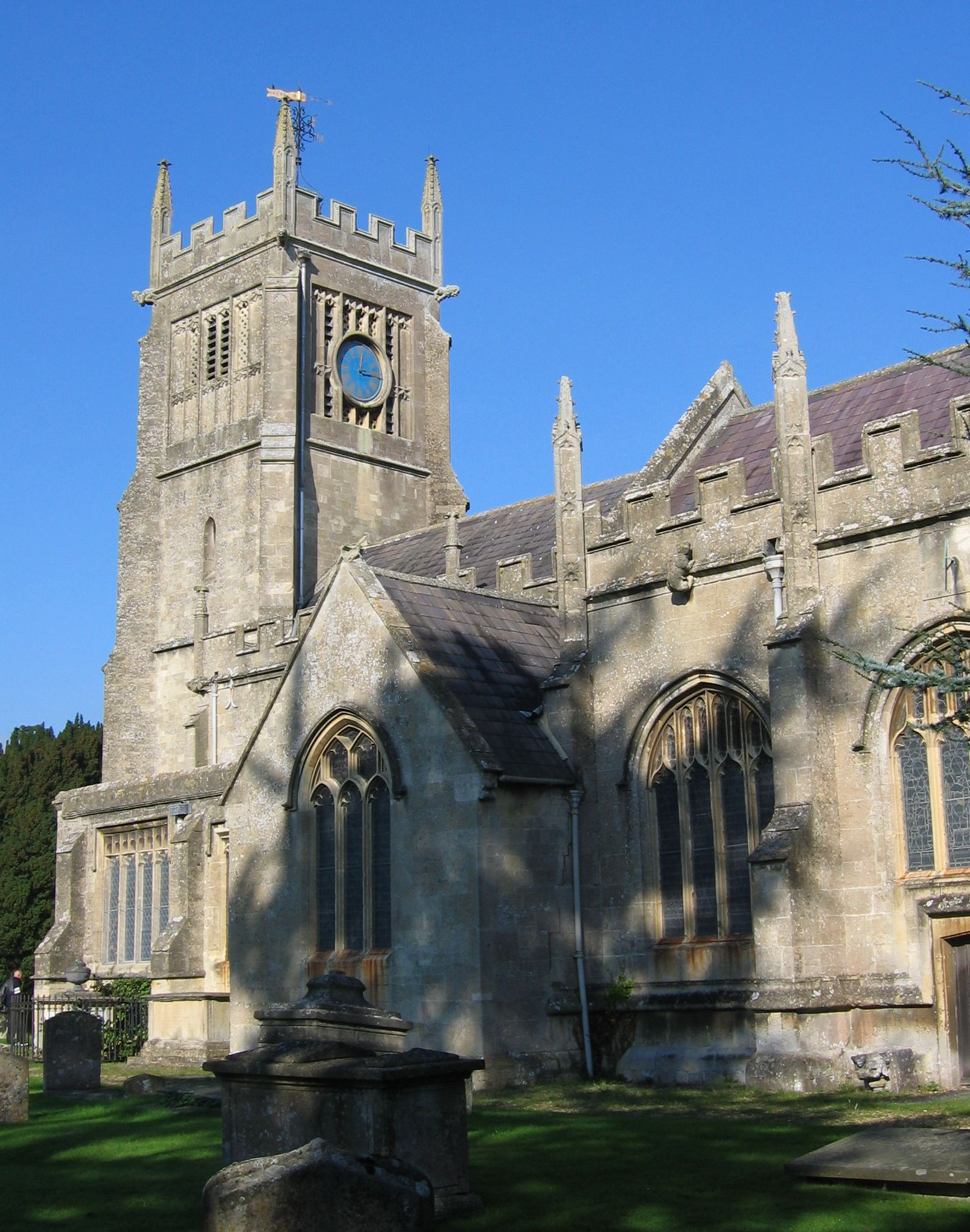
St Michael's Church was begun in the 12th century

A church was recorded at Melksham in the Domesday Book of 1086. The parish church of St Michael and All Angels has 12th-century origins, and was enlarged in the 14th, 15th and 16th centuries; in 1845 it was restored by T. H. Wyatt and is now a Grade II* listed building. As the town expanded, in 1876 St Andrew's church was built in Early English style to serve the Forest area to the northeast of the town.

A Baptist chapel was erected at Old Broughton Road in 1714, and replaced with a larger building on the same site in 1776 which was enlarged in 1839. In 1850 there were 165 members, and 340 children attended the Sunday School. In 1909, school buildings were completed on land in front of the chapel.

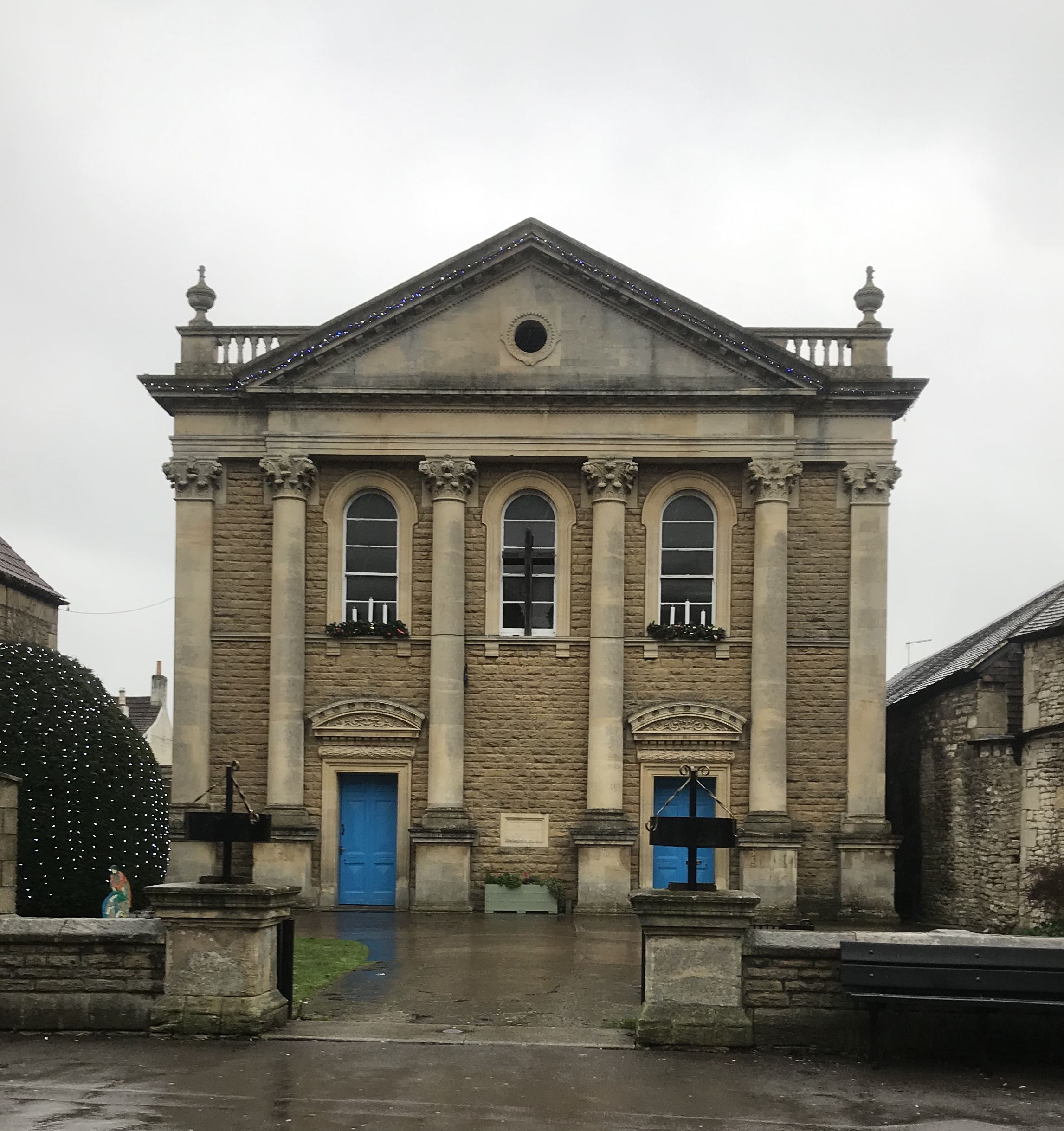
Melksham United Church

Ebenezer Baptist Church, Union Street, was built in 1835 by Particular Baptists. A Methodist chapel was built on the High Street in 1872, its two-storey front having four large Corinthian columns and a cornice with oculus. This became the United Church after the union of the Methodists and Congregationalists in 1976, and the Congregational church off the Market Place closed.

A Catholic church, St Anthony of Padua, was built in pale brick to the south of the town centre and opened in 1939. An independent congregation built Queensway Chapel in the eastern suburbs in 1967.

Melksham has a long history of Quakerism, beginning with meetings nearby at Shaw in the 17th century. A meeting-house was built in 1698 at what is now King Street, and rebuilt on the same site around 1777 (or 1734). Quakerism declined in the 19th century but the Melksham meeting continued until 1950. The meeting-house was sold in 1958 and was used as a Spiritualist church for a time; in 2015 the building was restored and converted into offices.

== Governance ==
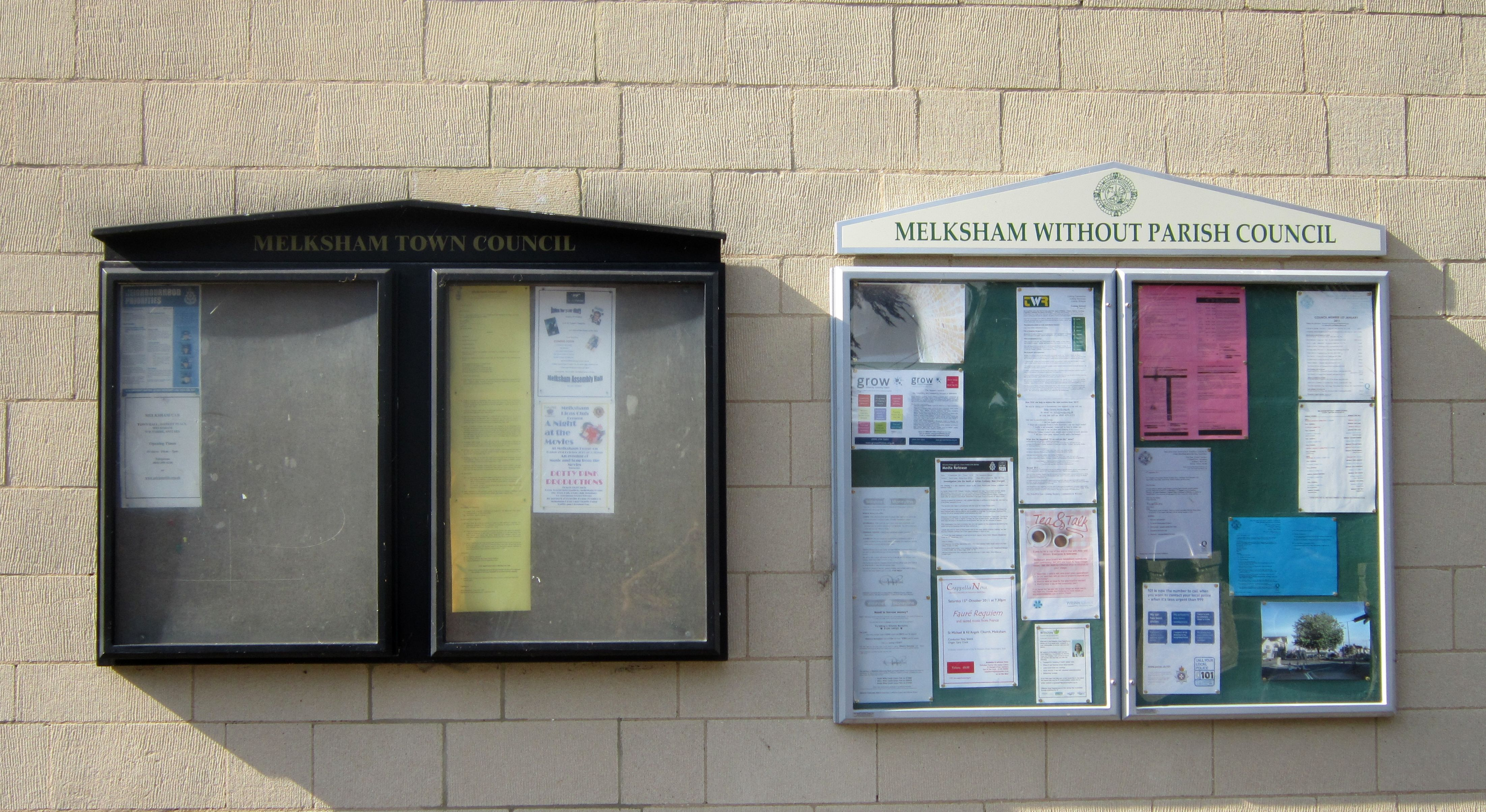
The two Melksham councils' noticeboards at the Town Library

Until 1974 the town was managed by Melksham Urban District Council, based at Melksham Town Hall. It was then managed by West Wiltshire District Council, but since the abolition of West Wiltshire in 2009, the most significant local government functions (including schools, roads, social services, recycling, emergency planning, leisure services, housing, development control and waste disposal) have been carried out by Wiltshire Council, a unitary authority.

Melksham civil parish is divided into four electoral divisions, each electing one member to Wiltshire Council. These are Melksham Forest, Melksham East, Melksham South, and Melksham Without North & Shurnold; the latter extends north beyond the parish to include Whitley, Shaw and Beanacre.

The civil parish has a town council, Melksham Town Council, with fifteen members elected by four wards: East, Forest, North and South. The councillors elect one of their number as Mayor of Melksham for a one-year term. As well as having a consultative role, the town council runs the Assembly Hall events venue. Since 2019–2020 it is responsible for the town's play areas and King George V playing field, after transfer of ownership from Wiltshire Council. The council came into national news in 2026 when a photo of a Melksham Independent News reporter was attached to a punchbag in the offices of the council.

The outskirts of Melksham, and most of the surrounding rural communities, are administered by another parish council, Melksham Without.

For Westminster elections, Melksham is part of the Melksham and Devizes constituency, which was created following a boundary review and first contested at the 2024 general election, when it was won by Brian Mathew for the Liberal Democrats.

== Geography ==
The civil parish of Melksham includes Melksham Forest, formerly a separate settlement 0.8 miles (1.3 km) to the northeast and now a suburb of the town. It has an Anglican church (St Andrew's, 1876) and had a Methodist chapel (1905 to before 2010).

The parish of Melksham Without includes several villages and suburbs of Melksham:

- Bowerhill, a large residential community generally considered as separate from Melksham, with a large industrial area
- Hunter's Meadow, a 2020s development north of Bowerhill
- Berryfield, a village south of and adjacent to Melksham, often considered part of the town
- Beanacre, a village to the north, again often considered as a northern suburb of the town.

== Demography ==
In the 19th century, the population of Melksham parish increased from 4,000 at the 1801 census to 5,800 in 1851, then declined to 2,100 in 1891. Numbers increased slowly in the first half of the 20th century and more rapidly in the second half, rising to 14,204 by 2001. The 2011 census saw a modest increase to 14,677.

The wider built-up area – which includes Berryfield and Bowerhill, both in Melksham Without parish – had a population of 19,357 at the 2011 census.

== Economy ==
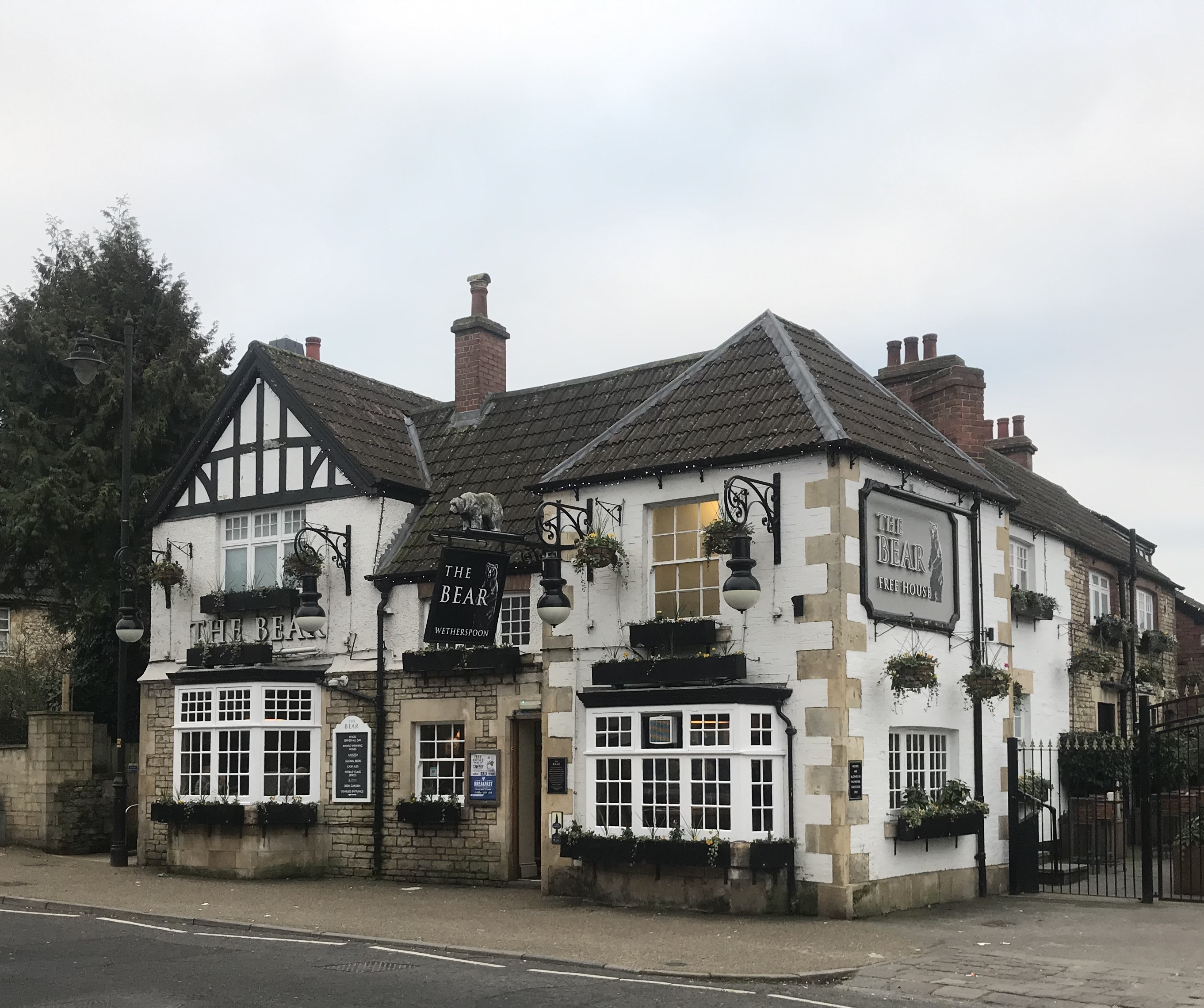
The Bear, Melksham

The Shell Guide to Wiltshire, published in 1968, characterised the town as "with the exception of Swindon the most industrialized in the county". Today, Melksham has varied industries including Avon Rubber, which previously owned the Avon Tyre plant on a riverside site in the town centre. The plant became the home of Cooper Tire & Rubber (a subsidiary of the American Goodyear company) and was a major employer in the town, producing Cooper Avon and Avon Tyres brands until the site closed at the end of 2023. In 2000, Avon Rubber moved to a large purpose-built facility 3 km (1.9 mi) to the south of the town near Semington, employing over 300 on products such as gasmasks.

Also to the south of the town, an area of light industry at Bowerhill is partly on the site of the former RAF Melksham training schools. Modern buildings here include regional headquarters designed by Sir Nicholas Grimshaw for the American office furniture maker Herman Miller, and the UK headquarters of Knorr-Bremse, designer and manufacturer of railway braking systems.

Melksham has a number of pharmacies, high street clothes shops, charity shops and privately run individual stores. It has five supermarkets: Asda, Sainsbury's, Waitrose, Lidl and Aldi.

== Culture and community ==
Melksham has an Assembly Hall and the Rachel Fowler Centre, while many of the surrounding villages have community halls which offer a wide variety of activities. Melksham Oak Community School offers a variety of sporting and cultural facilities to the community of Melksham.

The town has an annual 'Party in the Park' which usually takes place in July. It includes a fair with rides and amusements, a fireworks display, a stage hosting musical and dance acts and a carnival parade through the town with floats promoting local businesses and clubs and raising money for charity.

== Media ==
Local news and television programmes are provided by BBC West and ITV West Country. Television signals are received from the Mendip TV transmitter.

Melksham Independent News is the town's family-owned independent newspaper, established in 1981. Over 13,700 copies of the paper are distributed across the town and surrounding villages biweekly. The town is also served by the regional newspapers, Gazette and Herald and Wiltshire Times.

Local radio stations are BBC Radio Wiltshire on 104.3 FM, Heart West on 102.2 FM, and Greatest Hits Radio South West on 107.5 FM.

== Sport and leisure ==
Melksham Community Campus, built by Wiltshire Council on a central site next to Melksham House, opened in 2022. It provides a swimming pool, library, sports centre and council offices.

Melksham has a non-League football club, Melksham Town F.C., who play at the Oakfield Stadium on Eastern Way, which opened in January 2017. In 2018 the club won promotion from the Western League to the Southern League. Melksham Rugby Union Club also play at the Oakfields complex, on separate pitches.

The Wiltshire School of Gymnastics is at Bowerhill. Melksham has a cricket club who play their home matches at the Melksham House ground. The club has both youth and adult teams; in the 2019 season their Saturday side competed in Division 4 of the Wiltshire County Cricket League following promotion in 2018.

== Transport ==
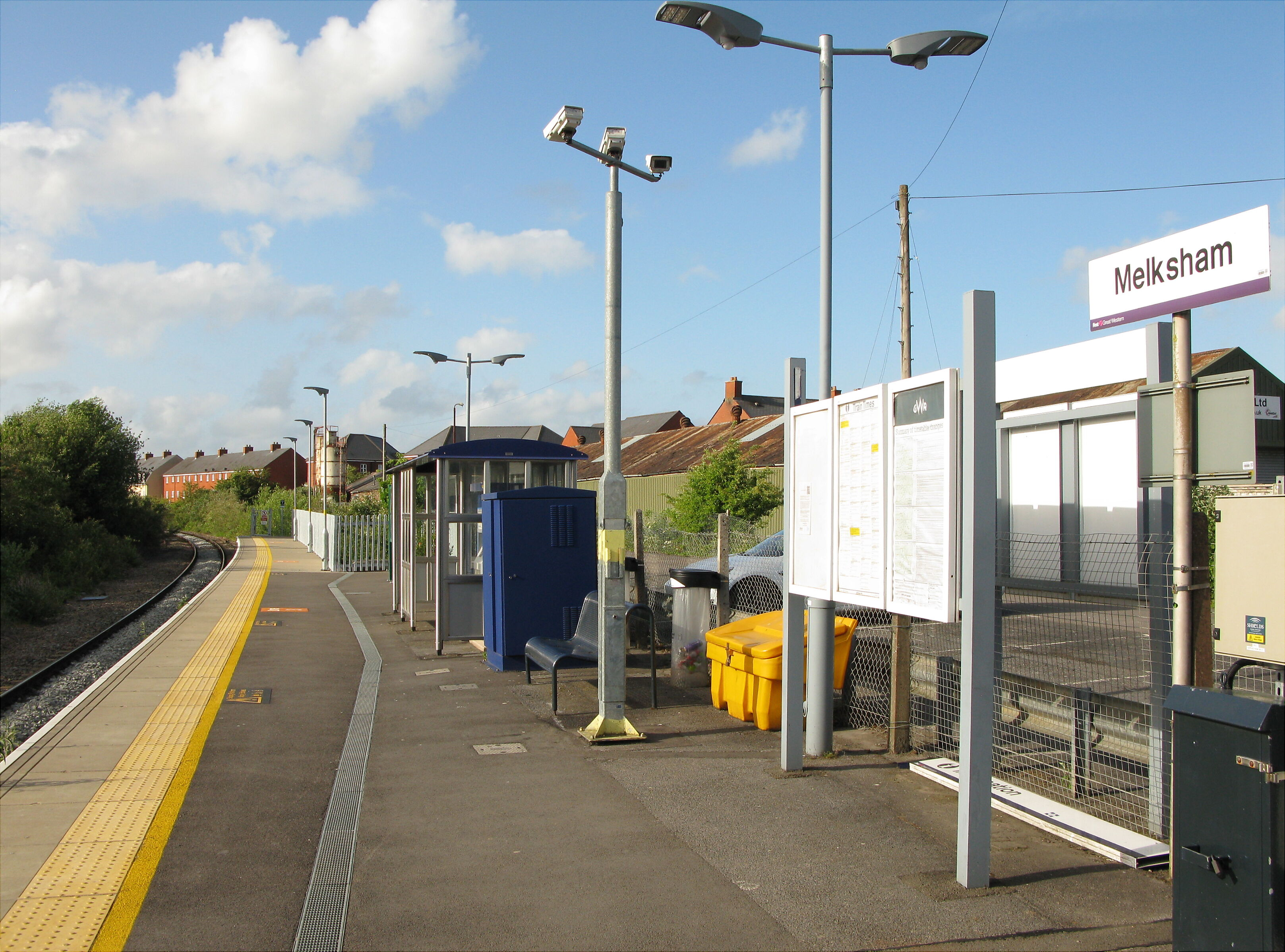
Melksham station in 2020

Melksham railway station, on the branch of the Wessex Main Line from Chippenham to Trowbridge, has services roughly every two hours in each direction on weekdays. Trains are operated by Great Western Railway, with services marketed as the 'TransWilts line' between Westbury and Swindon.

Melksham is served by bus companies including Faresaver and First West of England.

The town is on the north–south A350 primary route from the M4 motorway (Junction 17, near Chippenham) to Poole on the south coast. In February 2020, the central government gave approval for a £125m re-routing of the A350 to the east of Melksham.

== Education ==
Primary schools within Melksham parish are:

- Aloeric Primary School
- Forest & Sandridge C of E Primary School
- The Manor C of E VC Primary School (formerly Lowbourne Junior, St Michaels School)
- River Mead School (formerly King's Park Primary School, Lowbourne Infants School)

Primary schools near the town include:

- Bowerhill Primary School
- Churchfields Primary School, Atworth
- Seend C of E Primary School
- Shaw C of E Primary School
- St Mary's Broughton Gifford Primary School

There is one secondary school in the Melksham catchment area: Melksham Oak Community School opened in 2010 at Bowerhill, replacing The George Ward Technology College which served the community for over 50 years.

Stonar School, an all-ages independent day and boarding school, is nearby at Atworth.

== Naming of prehistoric species ==
Melksham is the namesake for a prehistoric crocodile species discovered in the town. Ieldraan melkshamensis, or the Melksham Monster, was 10 ft long and was an apex predator in the waters around the UK during the Jurassic period. It was the only known member of the Ieldraan genus. The fossilized remains of one of the species had been in the possession of the Natural History Museum since 1875, until a team from the University of Edinburgh led by Davide Foffa classified it in 2017 as a distinct species.

== Notable people ==
- Edward Barnwell (1813–1887), schoolmaster, archaeologist and antiquarian, owned Melksham House from 1866 and financed the building of St Andrew's church in the Forest area of the town
- Matthew Bound, footballer
- Edmund Wright Brooks (1834–1928), Quaker philanthropist
- John Fowler (1826–1864), agricultural engineer
- Ken Gill (1927–2009), trade union leader and caricaturist, born and brought up in Melksham
- Sidney Goodwin (1910–1912), born in Melksham, child victim of the sinking of the Titanic together with his parents and five siblings
- James Hurn, cricketer
- Julia de Lacy Mann (1891–1985), economic historian, principal of St Hilda's College, Oxford; retired to Melksham, was president of the West Wiltshire Historical Society
- Robert Martineau, Anglican bishop; curate in Melksham from 1938
- Phil McMullen, writer, music critic, events organiser
- Henry Moule (1801–1880), pioneer of the earth closet
- Horace Newte, writer, born in Melksham
- Andy Park, known as "Mr. Christmas"
- Diana Ross, children's author, lived at Shaw for many years
- Brad Scott, MMA fighter
- John Dunlop Southern, cricketer
- George Thicknesse, 19th Baron Audley, died, and is buried, in Melksham
- Ann Yearsley (ca. 1753–1806), poet; died in Melksham
