= The George Ward Technology College =

The George Ward School
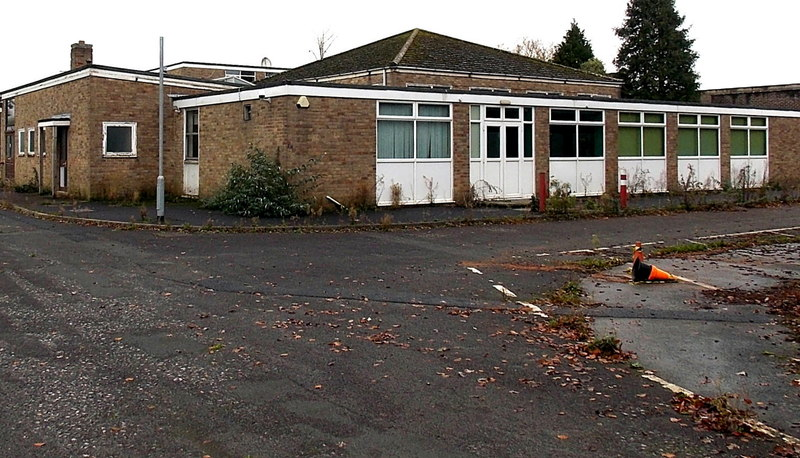

Location
- Shurnhold; Melksham, Wiltshire, SN12 8DQ; England; 51°22′57″N 2°09′01″W

Information
- Local authority: Wiltshire
- Department for Education URN: 126448 Tables
- Ofsted: Reports
- Gender: Coeducational
- Age: 11 to 18
- Enrolment: 1428

The George Ward Technology College was a medium-sized comprehensive school in Melksham, Wiltshire, England between 1953 and 2010. A maintained co-educational secondary school, it catered for pupils aged 11 to 18. Wiltshire County Council was the Local Authority for the school.

The school's last Ofsted report, published in February 2010, assessed the school as "inadequate", "performing significantly less well than in all the circumstances it could reasonably be expected to perform." The school was subsequently given a notice to improve.

== History ==
The school opened in September 1953 as Shurnhold School with accommodation for 800 pupils, on the north-west outskirts of Melksham, on the road to Shaw. It was the first post-war secondary school in Wiltshire.

Shurnhold was a secondary modern school. Its name changed to George Ward School on its transition to a comprehensive school. The school was named after Alderman George Ward who served as the first Chairman of Governors from the opening of the school until he died in February 1969. By 2006, the school had over 1400 pupils.

In 2006, the George Ward School was selected for replacement by a new school under the Building Schools for the Future programme. It was replaced by Melksham Oak School which opened on a new site, south-east of the town, in June 2010. The George Ward site was sold for a housing development named George Ward Gardens.
