= Melksham House =

Historic house in Melksham, Wiltshire, England

Coordinates: 51.3713°N 2.1409°W

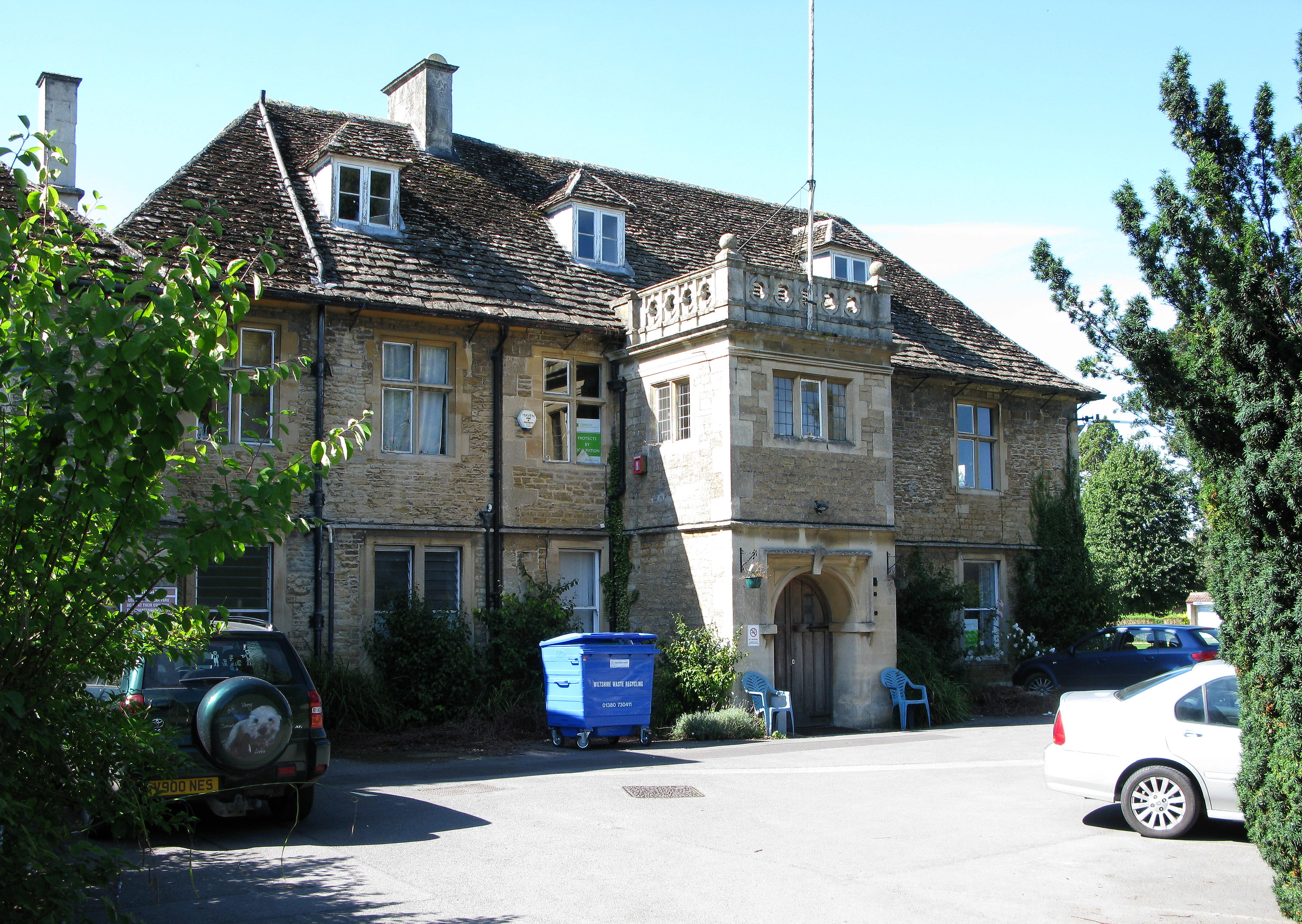
Façade of Melksham House, 2016; the two-storey porch is a 19th-century addition

Melksham House is an 18th-century Grade II listed house in the centre of Melksham, Wiltshire, England. It is owned by Wiltshire Council and is the home of Melksham House School, for children and young people with complex needs.

== History ==
Henry III granted the manor of Melksham to Amesbury Abbey, who held it until the Dissolution. A path across the churchyard provided access to St Michael's Church from the manor house.

The house stands 164 yards (150 m) west of the Market Place. It was built in the early 18th century, although records show a building on this site from about 1608. In 1699, Richard Coxeter sold the property to Sir Walter Long, after which time various replacements and extensions were added over the years, while the house continued in the ownership of the Long family.

During the 19th century the house had a succession of owners, including (from 1866) Edward Barnwell, schoolmaster, archaeologist and antiquarian, who financed the building of St Andrew's church in the Forest area of the town. After the house was bought in 1895 by Charles Awdry of Shaw Hill House, the Blathwayt family were tenants – among them George Blathwayt, appointed High Sheriff of Wiltshire in 1916.

In 1920, the house and surrounding 25 acres (10 ha) was in the ownership of the Avon Rubber Company, purchased for use as the company club and sports centre for the "social welfare of their employees". The formal opening of the club took place on 11 December 1920, but just days later a fire broke out destroying much of the house, and all that could be salvaged was the façade which has remained intact to this day. The damaged part of the house was rebuilt in a manner more suited to a sports club. In 1963, Nikolaus Pevsner wrote that the house was "... alas so much pulled about that it cannot count any longer as a C17 building". The house was designated as Grade II listed in 1985.

In 1997, Avon Rubber sold its tyre interest to Cooper Tire & Rubber Company of Findlay, Ohio, United States, and included in this sale was Avon's 35-acre (14 ha) manufacturing site in Melksham and the Melksham House sports and social club. The house and the surrounding site were sold in 2011 to Wiltshire Council, and in 2021 work began to redevelop it into a "campus" of council and health services, including a sports hall, swimming pool and library. A two-year renovation and enlargement of the building began in 2023, to prepare it for use as a school.

The sports ground on the southern part of the site was the home of Melksham Town F.C. from 1926, and was also used by Melksham Rugby Club. In January 2017, to enable the building of the campus, both clubs moved to new facilities at Oakfields on the eastern edge of the town. Melksham Cricket Club continue to have their ground to the south of the modern building.

=== Melksham House School ===
Melksham House School opened in September 2025. It is run by the Swindon-based Brunel Academies Trust and provides specialist primary and secondary education for children and young people from the age of 4 to 16 with complex social, emotional and/or mental health or medical needs. There are up to 42 primary places and 25 secondary places.
