= Marcia Sherlon Barnwell =

Saint Vincent and the Grenadines politician

Senator
- In office 29 December 2015 – 29 January 2019
- Appointed by: Frederick Ballantyne
- Preceded by: ?
- Succeeded by: Israel Bruce

Personal details
- Party: New Democratic Party
- Education: McGill University

Marcia Sherlon Barnwell is a Vincentian lawyer and politician who served in the House of Assembly of Saint Vincent and the Grenadines from 2015 until 2019. A member of the New Democratic Party, she served as an opposition senator, a position appointed by the governor-general.

Prior to entering politics, Barnwell was a barrister with a focus in education, human rights, and community development. She was the recipient of a Chevening Scholarship in 2000 and 2001, and also received a professional certificate in parliamentary governance from McGill University.

Among her actions in parliament, Barnwell questioned Prime Minister Ralph Gonsalves over the "alleged beating of a person in police custody". She left office at the end of her term in January 2019.
