= Juliette Walker Barnwell =

Bahamian educator and public administrator

Juliette Juanita Walker Barnwell (–September 11, 2016) was a Bahamian educator and public administrator in the Bahamian Ministry of Education. Barnwell was the first Bahamian Secretary to the Governor General. After Barnwell retired from her government position, she assumed the role of the Chairwomen of the National Council for Older Persons in November 2011.

== Early life and education ==
Juliet Walker was the daughter of Claudius R. Walker and Mable Walker. She grew up in a family that was heavily involved with campaigning for universal suffrage and majority rule in The Bahamas.

== Career ==
=== Educator ===
Barnwell continued her parents legacy of public service with a career as an educator and public administration. She began her career in education as a teacher at Xavier's College, Southern Senior School and Harold Road Secondary. She also taught courses in protocol, communications and ethics for the public sector.

Barnwell transferred to an administrative positions first in the Curriculum Division, then to the Management Division and later to a position of Personnel Officer in the Ministry of Education. She held positions on the executive board of the Bahamas Union of Teachers and was the Chairwomen of the Bahamian National School Board.

=== Organizations ===
Barnwell was president of the Bahamas Cooperative League and Director and President of the Public Worker's Cooperative Credit Union.

She advanced to the position of Bahamian Secretary to the Governor-General.

== Later life and death ==
After Barnwell retired as Secretary to the Governor General, she assumed the position of the Chairwomen of the National Council for Older Persons in November 2011. Barnwell died in September 2016
