= Charles Frederick Barnwell =

English museum curator and antiquary

Charles Frederick Barnwell FRS (1781 in Lawshall – 22 March 1849 in St Giles, London) was an English museum curator and antiquary.

The second son of Frederick Barnwell, Barnwell was christened on 12 March 1781 in Lawshall. He matriculated at age 16 on 25 May 1797 at Gonville and Caius College, Cambridge, where he graduated B.A. (11th Wrangler) 1802 and M.A. 1805. He was a Fellow of Gonville and Caius College from 1803 to 1805. He was elected F.R.S. in 1809. Barnwell resided at Brentwood, Essex and then at Bath, Somerset until 1823. He was Assistant Keeper of the Department of Antiquities, British Museum from 1826 to 1844. In 1827 he was elected a Fellow of the Society of Antiquaries.

Barnwell married Jane Lowry, who was a daughter of Rev. John Lowry, Anglican Rector of Clogherny Parish in County Tyrone and had connections with the Anglo-Irish aristocracy and the Perrot family of Herefordshire. Their marriage produced seven children, one of whom was Edward Barnwell.
