= Braydon =

Civil parish in Wiltshire, England

Coordinates: 51.593°N 1.921°W

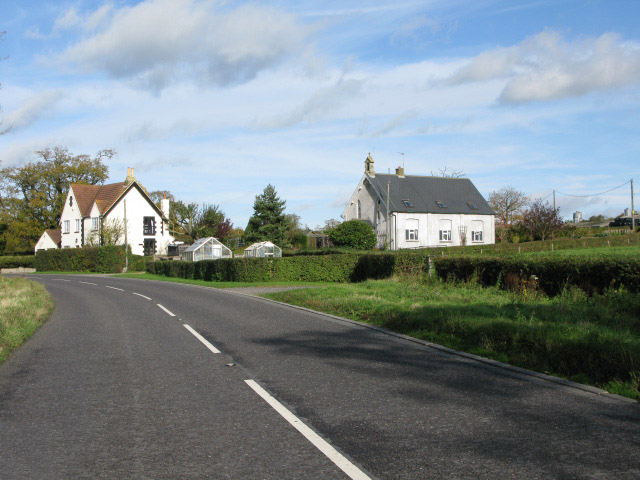
- Houses on the B4696, including the former church

- Location within Wiltshire
- Population: 467 (in 2021)
- OS grid reference: SU056882
- Unitary authority: Wiltshire
- Ceremonial county: Wiltshire
- Region: South West
- Country: England
- Sovereign state: United Kingdom
- Post town: Swindon
- Postcode district: SN5
- Dialling code: 01666
- Police: Wiltshire
- Fire: Dorset and Wiltshire
- Ambulance: South Western
- UK Parliament: South Cotswolds

Braydon is a civil parish in north Wiltshire, England, about 6 miles (10 km) northwest of Swindon, between Purton and Minety. A thinly-populated farming area with no settlements apart from the farms, it is best known for sharing its name with Braydon Forest.

The River Key rises in the parish and flows north-east to join the Thames. Ravensroost Wood, in the far west of the parish, is a nature reserve managed by Wiltshire Wildlife Trust.

== History ==
Evidence has been found of prehistoric people, including a Neolithic axehead and a possible Palaeolithic flint tool.

Historian Andrew Breeze considers the area to be the site of the little-documented Battle of Badon, a setback for the Anglo-Saxon settlement of Britain in the late 5th century or early 6th. He proposes that it was fought around Ringsbury Camp, an Iron Age hillfort on high ground a short distance beyond the east boundary of the modern parish.

In 903, the rebel Saxon Æthelwold of Wessex and the Viking raiding-army from East Anglia raided Braydon and the surrounding area.

In the Middle Ages, Braydon was a tithing of Purton and belonged to the Duchy of Lancaster, giving rise to the name of Duchy Wood, and passed to the Crown with the rest of the Duchy. Red Lodge was a royal hunting lodge until the land was developed in the 17th century; the brick-built 16th-century structure survives, altered in the 20th century and now three dwellings. The southern boundary of the tithing was the medieval road from Purton to Malmesbury, which was part of a route from Oxford to Bristol; today this is an unclassified road.

In 1826, the Crown exchanged Braydon for other land and it thus came into the ownership of the 3rd Earl of Clarendon, who had previously leased it. In 1829 the estate was sold to Joseph Neeld of Grittleton, at which time it consisted of 1,357 acres (5.49 km^{2}) divided into several farms, called Battle Lake, Cock's Hill, Duchy, Maple Sale, Park Gate with Roebuck, Pound House, Raven's Roost, Red Lodge, and White Lodge. In 1901 the Neeld estate was broken up, and by 1910 about half of Braydon belonged to Mr J. E. Ward, whose granddaughter Elizabeth Ward owned Red Lodge, Pound and Coxhill farms in 2010.

A small school was built in 1858 and became a National School in 1876. The school closed in 1933 owing to falling pupil numbers.

In 1866, Braydon became a civil parish separate from Purton.

== Religious sites ==
The tithing and now the civil parish have always been part of Purton ecclesiastical parish. A small chapel of ease was built in 1868, and later moved to a site near the Ashton Keynes road (now the B4696). The church closed in the 1970s and became a private house.

Braydon Methodist chapel was built in 1889, just over the south-west boundary of the parish. It is a "tin tabernacle" constructed with corrugated iron, and is still in use as of 2016.

== Braydon Forest ==
In the year 688, Cædwalla, king of the West Saxons, granted Abbot Aldhelm of Malmesbury Abbey thirty hides on the eastern side of Braydon Wood (de orientali parte silve Bradon).

At its greatest extent, Braydon Forest covered about a third of the area of Wiltshire, but over the centuries most of it was slowly cleared, and by 1773 little remained in this area. Woodland from 19th-century plantations today covers around 20 percent of the parish.

== Governance ==
With its tiny population, Braydon is considered too small to merit a parish council and has instead a parish meeting. Most significant local government functions are now carried out by Wiltshire Council, a unitary authority. For Westminster elections, Braydon is part of the South Cotswolds constituency.
