= Purton =

Village in Wiltshire, England

Coordinates: 51.588°N 1.867°W

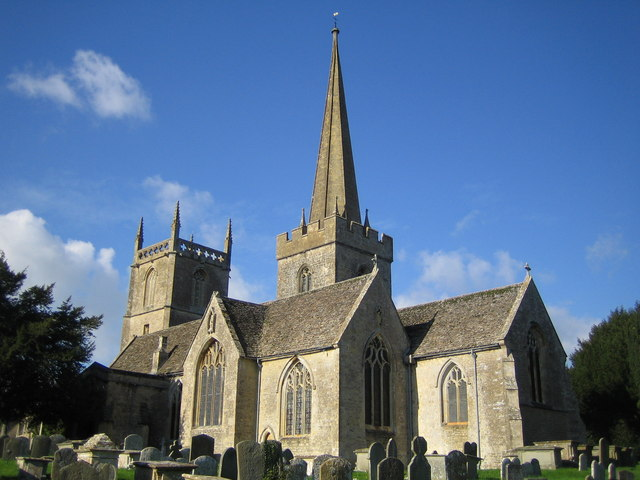
- St Mary's Church, Purton

- Location within Wiltshire
- Population: 6,798 (2021)
- OS grid reference: SU093877
- Civil parish: Purton
- Unitary authority: Wiltshire
- Ceremonial county: Wiltshire
- Region: South West
- Country: England
- Sovereign state: United Kingdom
- Post town: Swindon
- Postcode district: SN5
- Dialling code: 01793
- Police: Wiltshire
- Fire: Dorset and Wiltshire
- Ambulance: South Western
- UK Parliament: South Cotswolds
- Website: Parish Council

Purton is a large village and civil parish in north Wiltshire, England, about 4 miles (6 km) northwest of the centre of Swindon. The parish includes the village of Purton Stoke and the hamlets of Bentham, Hayes Knoll, Purton Common, Restrop, The Fox and Widham.

The 13th-century parish church, St Mary's, is unusual in having two towers, one with a spire.

== History ==
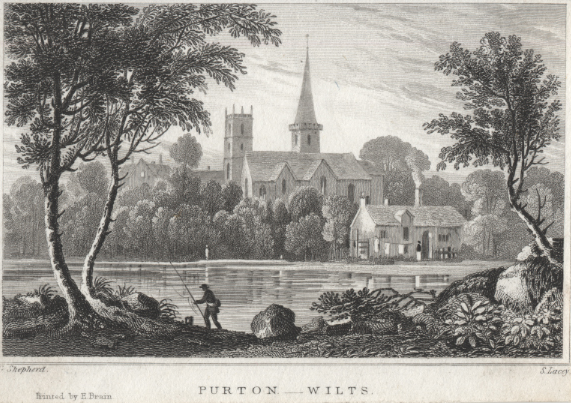
Purton in a copper engraving of about 1830

The toponym Purton is derived from the Old English pirige for "pear" and tun for "enclosure" or "homestead".

=== Early history ===
Ringsbury Camp has evidence of settlement during the Neolithic period but is considered to be an Iron Age hill fort dating from about 50 BC. There is a suggestion that the remains of a Roman villa lie under the soil at Pavenhill, on the Braydon side of Purton. At The Fox on the east side of the village, grave goods and bodies from a pagan Saxon cemetery have been excavated.

The earliest known written record of Purton dates from AD 796 when the Saxon King Ecgfrith of Mercia gave 35 hides from Purton to the Benedictine Malmesbury Abbey. The Abbot of Malmesbury continued to be the chief landlord of Purton throughout Saxon and Norman times, suggesting that an earlier church stood at Purton.

The ancient royal hunting forest of Bradon stretches out to Minety in the west. In ancient times it encompassed about 30,000 acres.

=== Civil War ===
It is thought a battle took place during the English Civil War in the Restrop area. A cannonball was discovered in the area and several place names refer to a battle, including the alternative name of Restrop Road, Red Street (which may signify the road was covered in blood) and Battlewell. A mile away are Battle Lake in Braydon Wood, and Battlelake Farm.

=== 19th century ===
The Cheltenham and Great Western Union Railway which runs south-east to north-west through the parish was opened in 1841, and was absorbed by the Great Western Railway in 1843. Purton station opened in 1841 to the north of the village, in the hamlet of Widham. The station closed in 1963 but the line remains open.

The tithing of Braydon, in the west of the parish, became a separate civil parish in 1866.

=== Second World War ===
There are a number of concrete pillboxes in the parish, which were part of the defences of Southern England during the Second World War. They form part of the GHQ Line Red, along which an anti-tank trench also ran, between Ballards Ash near Royal Wootton Bassett and the River Ray near Blunsdon railway station.

RAF Blakehill Farm, north of Purton Stoke, was a RAF Transport Command station that operated from 1944 until 1946; its site, mostly in Cricklade parish, has returned to farmland. United States troops were stationed in Braydon Wood, and attended dances at the Angel Hotel. Anti-tank devices (chains across the road, set in concrete blocks) were installed on the parish boundary across Tadpole Bridge that spans the River Ray. The Cenotaph on Purton High Street is a memorial to those who died in both world wars.

=== Local studies ===
Volume 18 of the Wiltshire Victoria County History, published in 2011, covers Purton.

== Governance ==
Purton Parish Council is the first tier of local government and is responsible for public open spaces, footpaths, and the upkeep of the cemetery; the council is a consultee on planning applications within the parish. All other local services are provided by the Wiltshire Council unitary authority. For Westminster elections, the parish falls within the South Cotswolds constituency.

Purton electoral ward covers the parishes of Purton and Braydon. The population of the ward taken at the 2011 census was 4,271.

== Geography ==
The River Key, a tributary of the Thames, crosses the parish near Purton Stoke.

The village is a linear settlement along the old road between the historic market towns of Cricklade, 4 miles (6.4 km) to the north, and Royal Wootton Bassett, 3 miles (4.8 km) to the south. It is now on a minor road, 3 miles (4.8 km) from junction 16 of the M4 motorway. The village is on the brow of a hill, with views across to Cricklade and the Thames floodplain. Nearby, the area once covered by Braydon Forest stretches out to Minety in the west.

Ridgeway Farm, a 700-house development of the early 21st century which extends Swindon's western suburbs, is in the east of the parish.

== Religious sites ==
The Church of England parish church of St Mary the Virgin appears at one time to have been dedicated to Saint Nicholas. The building is from the 13th, 14th and 15th centuries and was restored by William Butterfield in 1872. In 1955 it was designated as Grade I listed.

There was a Friends' meeting house at Purton Stoke during the late 17th century and early 18th century.

There was a Congregational chapel, licensed in 1829, where the Scout Hut is now in Purton High Street. Congregational use ceased in the 1920s and it was demolished in 1969.

There were two Methodist chapels in Purton village. The Primitive Methodist chapel was built at Upper Square in 1856 and enlarged in 1893; the Wesleyan Methodist chapel at Play Close was built in 1882, replacing a smaller chapel from the 1870s. By 1969, after declines in numbers, the two congregations united. The Play Close chapel was renovated and reopened in 1973 as Purton Methodist Church, then the Upper Square chapel was sold for residential use.

There was a Methodist church opposite Dairy Farm in 1832 at Purton Stoke. It was demolished in 1868 and rebuilt in Pond Lane. This building was sold in 2011 and converted for residential use.

== Notable buildings ==
In addition to the Grade I listed parish church, the parish has four Grade II* listed houses, each built in limestone rubble.

In Purton village, College Farmhouse is from the early 17th century. It has two storeys with attic, and a five-window front. The parlour has 17th-century panelling, and the wooden overmantel is carved with the Hyde arms and the date 1626; the house belonged to the father of Edward Hyde, 1st Earl of Clarendon.

Pound Farmhouse is an L-shaped 17th-century farmhouse, north of Widham on the road to Purton Stoke. Pond Farmhouse, south of Purton Stoke, is from the 16th, 17th and 18th centuries and is on an earlier moated site. Restrop House is from the late 16th century or early 17th. Its five-bay front has a two-storey porch, with the end bays also brought forward, and mullion-and-transom windows.

== Education ==
Bradon Forest School is the area's secondary school. It was built in 1962 and caters for pupils from Purton parish, Lydiard Millicent, Cricklade, Ashton Keynes and West Swindon. The school is in the centre of the village, south of the High Street.

On an adjacent site, St Mary's Church of England Primary School was opened in 2012, funded by the government's Primary Capital Programme and built on the site of the former junior school. Previously the school was split between two sites, with infants taught in the original Victorian building which opened in 1861 while juniors were in nearby buildings which opened in the early 1970s, along with the school's swimming pool.

In the east of the parish, Ridgeway Farm CE Academy (a primary school) was built in 2016 to serve the newly developed housing area.

Until 1978, Purton Stoke had its own primary school, on the Purton to Cricklade road, which opened in 1894 and at its peak had 100 pupils. However, numbers dropped continually from the 1930s when older pupils began to be educated in Purton, until there were only around 30 pupils left in the 1970s. The school closed in 1978. The building is now used by the Jubilee Gardens Project, a charity which provides education and training for adults with learning difficulties.

== Amenities ==
Village amenities include several shops, a sub-post office, a farm shop, a cafe, a dairy farm stand selling milk, meat and other local produce, a library with a small museum above, one Hair salon, public houses and takeaways, a GP's practice, dentist and veterinary surgery. The village has grown such that its retailers are not all concentrated in one centre. A few shops are on the main road at the junction with Pavenhill, called the Upper Square, and a few are around the bend in the road near the village hall called the Lower Square.

== Nature reserves ==
There are four Wiltshire Wildlife Trust nature reserves in the parish:

- Brockhurst Meadow is at the end of Brockhurst Lane, just below Ringsbury Camp. A rushy hay meadow with signs of ridge and furrow farming. Wildlife includes multiple wildflowers of wet meadows: ragged robin, sneezewort, meadowsweet, marsh thistle, common spotted orchid, heath spotted orchid, adder's-tongue fern, sedge species and the insects which feed on them such as the marbled white butterfly. grid reference SU069869.
- Blakehill Farm, partly in Purton parish, is the former RAF Blakehill Farm airfield from the Second World War. Its grasslands are habitat for mammals including roe deer and brown hare, birds including kestrel, skylark, wheatear, whinchat and stonechat and butterflies include small copper and brown hairstreak. The trust bought the site from the Ministry of Defence to form a large meadow of about 600 acres (240 ha), and opened it to the public in 2005. It rears a small quantity of organic grade beef, usually rare breeds such as longhorn cattle. These cattle ensure grasses and other common plants do not begin to dominate over the other rarer plants. grid reference SU073923.
- Stoke Common Meadows are at the end of Stoke Common Lane in Purton Stoke. A small wood and grasslands, with ancient hedgerows and ditches. The meadows are habitat for many wildflowers including pepper saxifrage, sweet vernal-grass, heath spotted orchid, adder's-tongue fern (Ophioglossum), bugle, ox-eye daisy and common knapweed. Some of the fields are a Site of Special Scientific Interest. grid reference SU070904.
- Red Lodge Pond is at the beginning of Red Drive in Braydon Wood, just off the B4042 road between Braydon Crossroads and Minety Crossroads. The reserve includes a large pond and a small meadow with a concrete platform in the middle: the remains of an old sawmill. Wildlife includes plants such as water horsetail, common spotted orchid; and woodland butterflies including Eurasian white admiral and silver-washed fritillary. grid reference SU054888.

Restrop Farm and Brockhurst Wood is a Site of Special Scientific Interest. It is at the end of Mud Lane, or at the end of Brockhurst Lane, but is mainly private land. Brockhurst Meadow is part of the farm.

== Public houses ==
There are four pubs in the parish:

- Angel Hotel in the High Street, thought to be the oldest pub in the village, dating from 1704.
- Royal George at Pavenhill, the west end of the village.
- The Bell at Purton Stoke and the
- Purton Red House on Church Street.

There is one members club: The working men's club, now Purton Club, on Station Road.

Several former pubs in Purton have closed:

- Blue Pig was on Purton's boundary at the Brinkworth to Minety and Purton to Garsdon crossroads near to Ravensroost Wood. It closed in the late 20th century.
- Forester's Arms was next door to the Royal George in Pavenhill. It closed in 1904.
- Another pub called the Forester's Arms was situated on the parish boundary at Common Platt. It closed in 2010.
- Fox Inn served the Fox area.
- Railway Hotel was renamed the Ghost Train after British Railways closed Purton railway station in 1963. The pub closed in 2008.
- Hope Inn at the Collins Lane junction was closed in 1995 and was the Elmgrove Saddlery before the building was turned into flats.
- Live and Let Live in Upper Pavenhill had the best views of any pub in the parish, looking over the Braydon area. It closed in 1967.
- Mason's Arms was in a house in the Upper Square. It was a pub until 1945.
- New Greyhound in Pavenhill. It closed in early 2008.
- Queen's Arms was near the sub-post office in the High Street.

== Sports and leisure ==
Purton has a Non-League football team, Purton F.C., who play at the Red House. Purton Youth Football Club caters for a wide range of ages and is based at Bradon Forest School.

Purton has a tennis club, based in the centre of the village. The cricket club, founded in 1820, claims to be the oldest in Wiltshire; their first team play in Division 1 of the Wiltshire County Cricket League. A bowls club has also existed in the village since 1970.

== Notable people ==
People connected with Purton include:

- Samuel Glasse (1735–1812), cleric and supporter of the Sunday school movement, born at Purton, son of Richard Glass, vicar of the parish
- James Kibblewhite, national running champion of the 1880s and 1890s, born in Purton in 1866
- The Reverend John Papworth (1921–2020), clergyman, writer and activist, lived at Purton in later life
- Desmond Morris (1928–2026), zoologist and author, lived at Purton as an infant
- Dave Gregory, long-time guitarist and keyboard player in the English rock band XTC, spent his childhood in the village
- Billie Piper (born 1982), singer and actress, attended Bradon Forest School

=== Local families ===
==== Maskelyne ====
In the Tudor period the Maskelyne family were significant landlords and landowners in Purton, having inherited rights granted by the last abbot of Malmesbury Abbey to the Pulley or Pulleyne family, from whom they descended on the distaff side. By 1679, the Maskelyne family had the right to be buried in the south transept of the church, and there are several memorials there. The Reverend Dr Nevil Maskelyne (1732–1811) was appointed Astronomer Royal in 1765, a position he held until death; his tomb is in the churchyard.

==== Hyde and Ashley-Cooper ====
The Royalist statesman and author Edward Hyde, who was returned as MP for the nearby Wootton Bassett constituency in the 1630s, lived at College Farm in the centre of Purton. It is likely that his daughter Anne Hyde, first wife of James II, also lived here for a time. After serving Charles II during his years of exile under the Commonwealth and Republic, Hyde later became Lord Chancellor of England, was ennobled as Earl of Clarendon, and appointed Chancellor of the University of Oxford.

Hyde's Whig arch-rival, Sir Anthony Ashley-Cooper, 1st Earl of Shaftesbury, also had property in Purton parish. The Ashley-Cooper family held the advowson of St. Mary's parish church until 1960.

==== Sadler ====
By the late 19th century and into the early part of the 20th century, other local families had risen to the gentry level after becoming significant landowners in the parish. Among these was James Henry Sadler, Esq., D.L., J.P., (1843–1929) who, though a Purton native, lived in nearby Lydiard House until his death. A strict but generous benefactor, Sadler gave the cricket ground and Working Men's Institute to the village. Described as the last unofficial "Squire of Purton", his father was Dr Samuel Champernowne Sadler, F.R.C.S., of Purton. In 1859 or 1860 Dr Sadler had the Pump House built at Salt's Hole, a natural mineral water spring near Purton Stoke, used for medicinal purposes since the Middle Ages and possibly earlier. Under Dr Sadler and subsequent owners, attempts were made to develop this natural attraction as Purton Spa, and to market the spring waters for their healing qualities.

== Sources and further reading ==
- Fox-Strangways, Charles Edward; Woodward, Horace Bolingbroke (2010) [1895]. The Jurassic Rocks of Britain. London: Geological Survey of Great Britain. p. 340. (on Salt's Hole)
- Kelly, Edward Robert, ed. (2009). Wiltshire. Newcastle upon Tyne: Cambridge Scholars' Publishing. p. 263. ISBN 978-1-150-19690-4. (on Purton Spa)
- Kelly, Susan E (2005). Charters of Malmesbury Abbey. Oxford: Oxford University Press. pp. 279–281. ISBN 0-19-726317-8. (on the ancient parish boundaries of Purton)
- Richardson, Ethel M (2009) [1919]. The Story of Purton; A Collection of Notes and Hearsay. Pranava Books. ISBN 978-1-152-48914-1.
- Robbins, A (1991). Purton's Past. Purton: Purton Historical Society. ISBN 0-9517142-0-1.
- Stratford, Joseph (2009) [1882]. Wiltshire and its worthies: notes topographical and biographical. Whitefish: Kessinger Publishing. p. 143. ISBN 978-1-104-53101-0.
