= Ringsbury Camp =

Iron Age hillfort in Wiltshire, England

- The Roman Camp
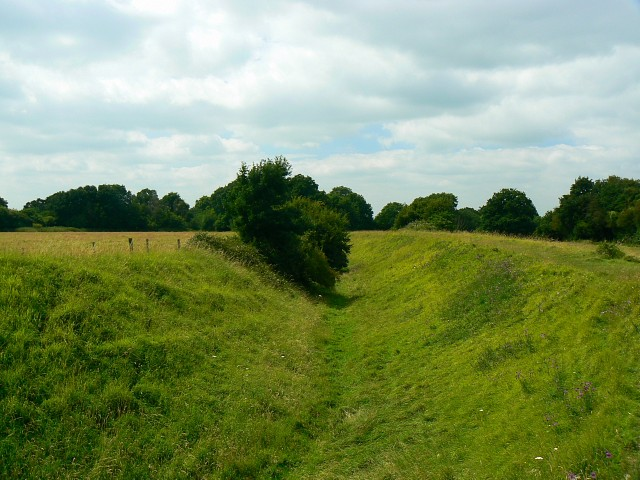

- Location within Wiltshire
- 51.5798°N 1.8932°W
- Periods: Iron Age
- Location: Purton, Wiltshire
- Region: South West England

Site notes
- Area: 8 acres (3.2 ha)
- Public access: yes, via rights of way

Ringsbury Camp is an Iron Age hill fort, thought to date from approximately the year 50BC, in the civil parish of Purton in Wiltshire, England. The site is a scheduled monument.

== Structure ==
Ringsbury is a multivallate fort, as it has a double-banked structure. In all about 3.4 hectares (8.4 acres) are enclosed by the surrounding walls. The inner bank is up to 5m high and is surrounded by a 3m deep ditch; the outer bank is 2m high and there are traces of an outer ditch.

The fort stands on the brow of an outcrop of Corallian stone, overlooking Braydon Forest to the west and with excellent views to the south and north; there is less of an incline towards the east. It is believed that to ensure visibility was not impeded the builders cleared all areas, and certainly the land towards the west, from trees. The banks are made from limestone rubble. These are not local rocks, suggesting material was transported to the camp from further afield.

The stones from the banks are very light, and are known as 'blood stones'. A reason for the lightness of the rocks was said to be blood soaking into the stones when they were used as missiles during battles; however, nowadays chemical weathering – carbonation – of the limestone is thought to account for their light mass.

== History ==
Historians have suggested that the fort may not have been used continually, but as an enclosure in times of unrest. Unrest was common in these times: the fort lies on the boundary of two old British kingdoms, and there were two major Celtic invasions in the years around which the fort was constructed. The fort is not part of the larger chain of hill forts along the Ridgeway, such as Barbury Castle, suggesting Ringsbury was an outpost. There are signs of earlier habitation of the site: Neolithic flint tools have been found within the fort.

One Iron Age coin was discovered at the site, and is currently displayed in Purton Museum.

Andrew Breeze has argued that Ringsbury Camp is the site of the Battle of Mount Badon in the late 5th century or early 6th century. He bases his case on geographical and toponymic evidence, with nearby Braydon being the Badon named by Gildas and the Welsh Annals.

== Today ==
The site was designated as a scheduled monument in 1925.

Several rights of way make the fort accessible. Ringsbury Camp can be reached most easily by walking west through fields from Battlewell and Restrop Road in Purton. The site has a grid reference of SU 075 867. Some local people refer to Ringsbury as 'The Roman Camp', although this does not reflect its earlier Iron Age heritage. Today Ringsbury is in grassland pasture, with the southern and western banks wooded. The centre of the camp, at one time, was ploughed, which may have destroyed any further artefacts waiting to be unearthed.

Ringsbury Camp is part of Restrop Farm, a biological Site of Special Scientific Interest.

== See also ==
- List of hill forts in England
- List of hill forts in Scotland
- List of hill forts in Wales
