= Laverstock ware =

Pottery produced in Wiltshire, England

Coordinates: 51°04′04″N 1°46′20″W

Laverstock ware is a type of pottery produced from the 11th to the 14th centuries near the settlement of Laverstock in Wiltshire, England. The products were distributed widely throughout southern England, including London. In modern archaeology the unique characteristics of recovered pieces allow for secure identification, thus providing dating evidence for the sites under investigation and insights into trade and transport patterns of the era. The Salisbury and South Wiltshire Museum considers its collection to be of outstanding importance.

== History and production ==
Although archaeomagnetic dating of pottery fragments found still in situ at Laverstock show dates of firing over the comparatively short period of 1230–1275, early fragments with very coarse composition have been found at Old Sarum in stratified layers dated to the middle of the 11th century. Demand for Laverstock ware was particularly high when Old Sarum was relocated to Salisbury in the 13th century and dateable examples from Salisbury, with fine-grained composition, show that production continued until the end of the 13th century, or later.

The earliest remains at the site are coarseware from the 11th century. A progressive development in technique has been identified, with more refined pieces being produced by about 1240. The tableware was lead- and tin-glazed, using galena (probably sourced from the Mendip Hills) and stannic oxide. The colouration was obtained from iron oxides. The use of stannic (tin) compounds in the glaze was specific to Laverstock ware and, using modern techniques of analysis, their presence serves to distinguish these artefacts from items produced elsewhere.

In the 13th and 14th centuries Laverstock was the centre of a prosperous ceramic industry, with baluster jugs (polychrome-glazed tall jugs) and aquamaniles being supplied to the nearby Clarendon Palace. They were also distributed all over the south of England, including London. Other, less sophisticated, products included money boxes, cookware, finials and ridge tiles (but not plain tiles), curfews (large, dished cover-plates to close off hearths at night), chimney pots and drainpipes.

== Location ==
The workshops and kilns were situated on a west-facing slope above the River Bourne, about 1 mile (1.6 km) east of Salisbury. The enterprise was probably started to cater for the requirements of the adjacent Clarendon Palace, 1 mile (1.6 km) to the east. Nine kilns have been identified, either dug into the marl of the lower slope, or excavated into the chalk higher up. The pits dug into the chalk were lined with marl, as this forms a hard lining when fired. Workshops and buildings for drying the pieces before firing were situated nearby. The marl was not suitable for pottery manufacture and the clay was carried from Alderbury, about 3 miles (4.8 km) to the south-east, or from Cockey Down, about 1.4 miles (2.3 km) to the north-east. Fuel came from managed woodland on the Clarendon estate. The site had easy access to the road between Salisbury and Winchester and by this means the products were distributed to Salisbury and beyond.

== Discovery ==
Concentrations of pottery sherds were first noticed in a field near Laverstock in 1940 and when groundworks were undertaken between 1955 and 1963 for allotments and roadbuilding, formal archeological excavations were made. In all, remains of nine kilns were found. Two had walls still standing, at heights of 2 feet (0.6 m) and 4 feet (1.2 m) respectively. The ovens were oval in plan, at about 5 feet (1.5 m) in length, with hearths or stokeholes at each end connected to the ovens by arches. The overall length was about 17 feet (5.2 m). Foundations of a nearby building were recorded, possibly the potters' workshop.

== Gallery ==
Sherds of Laverstock ware
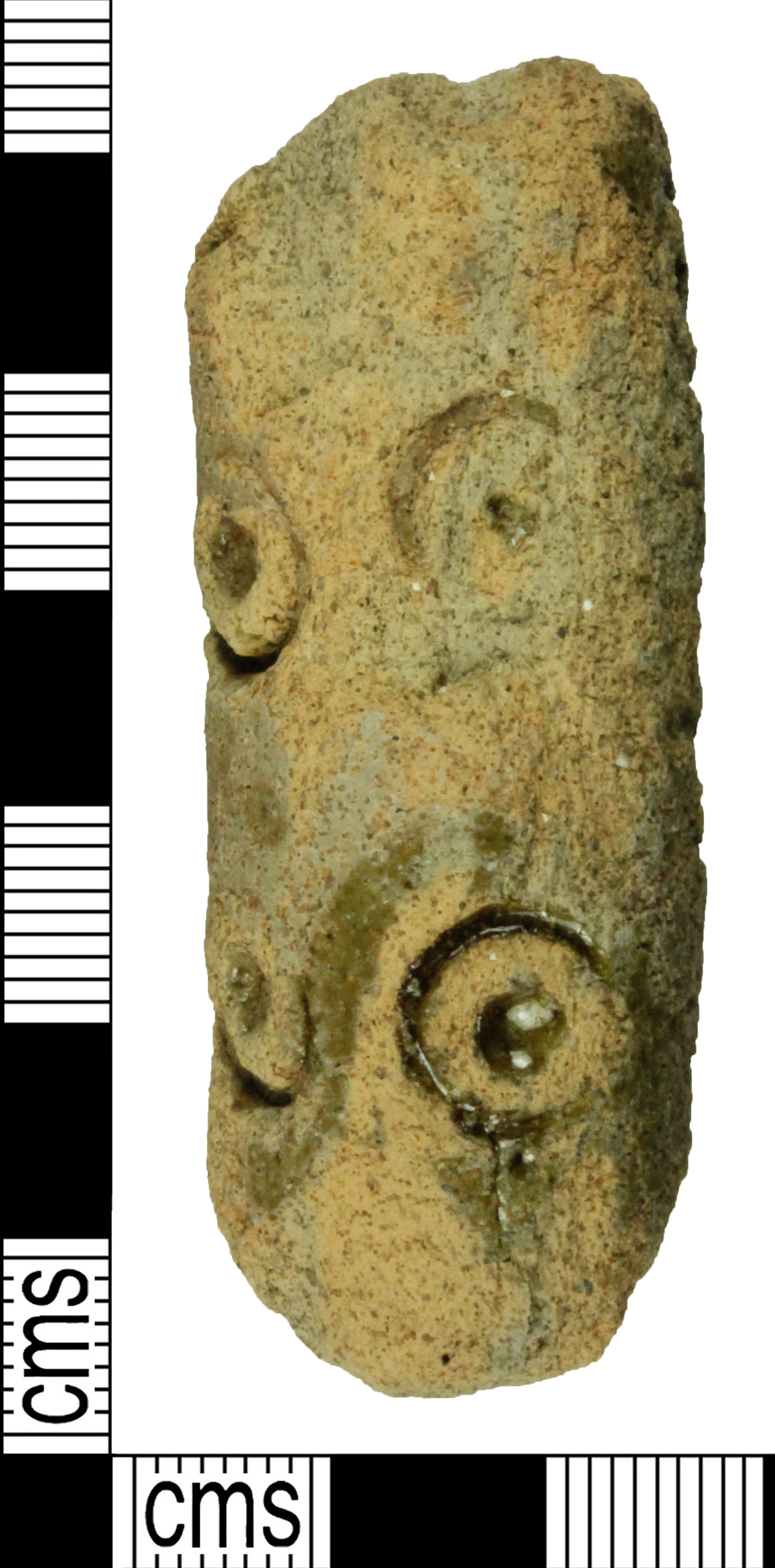
Jug handle

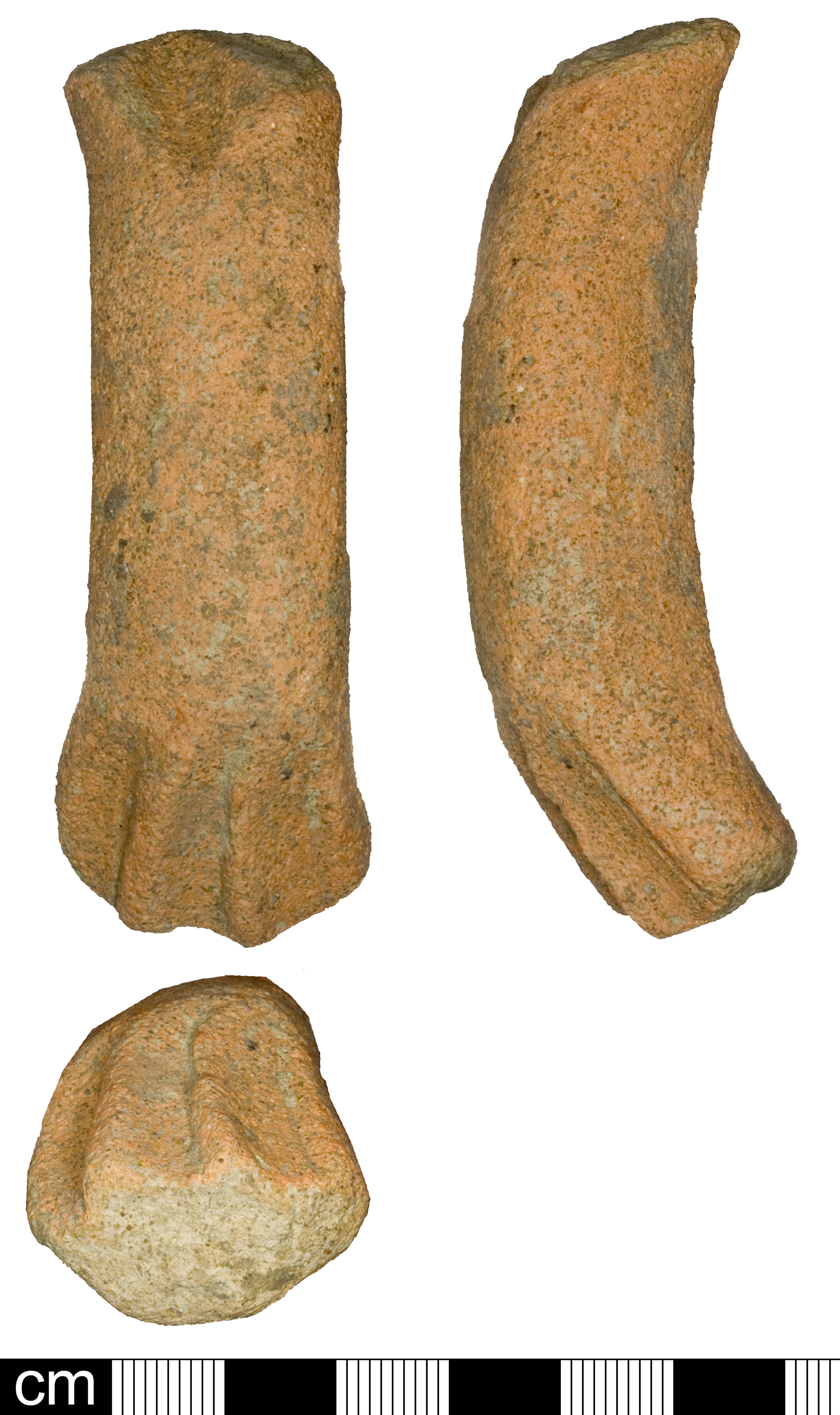
Pitcher handle

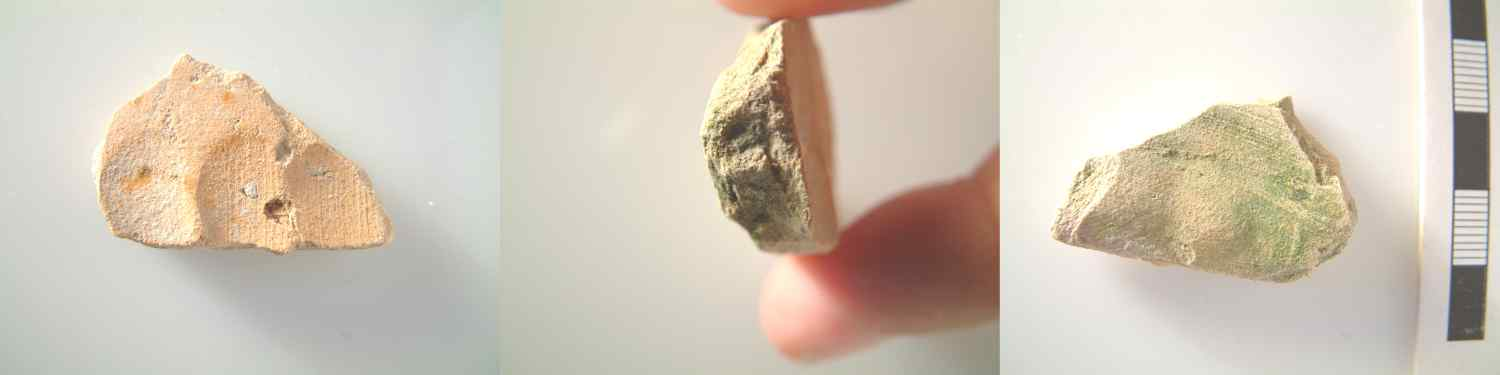
Sherd from a jug showing fine, pale fabric
