= Mike Brown (rugby union) =

England international rugby union player

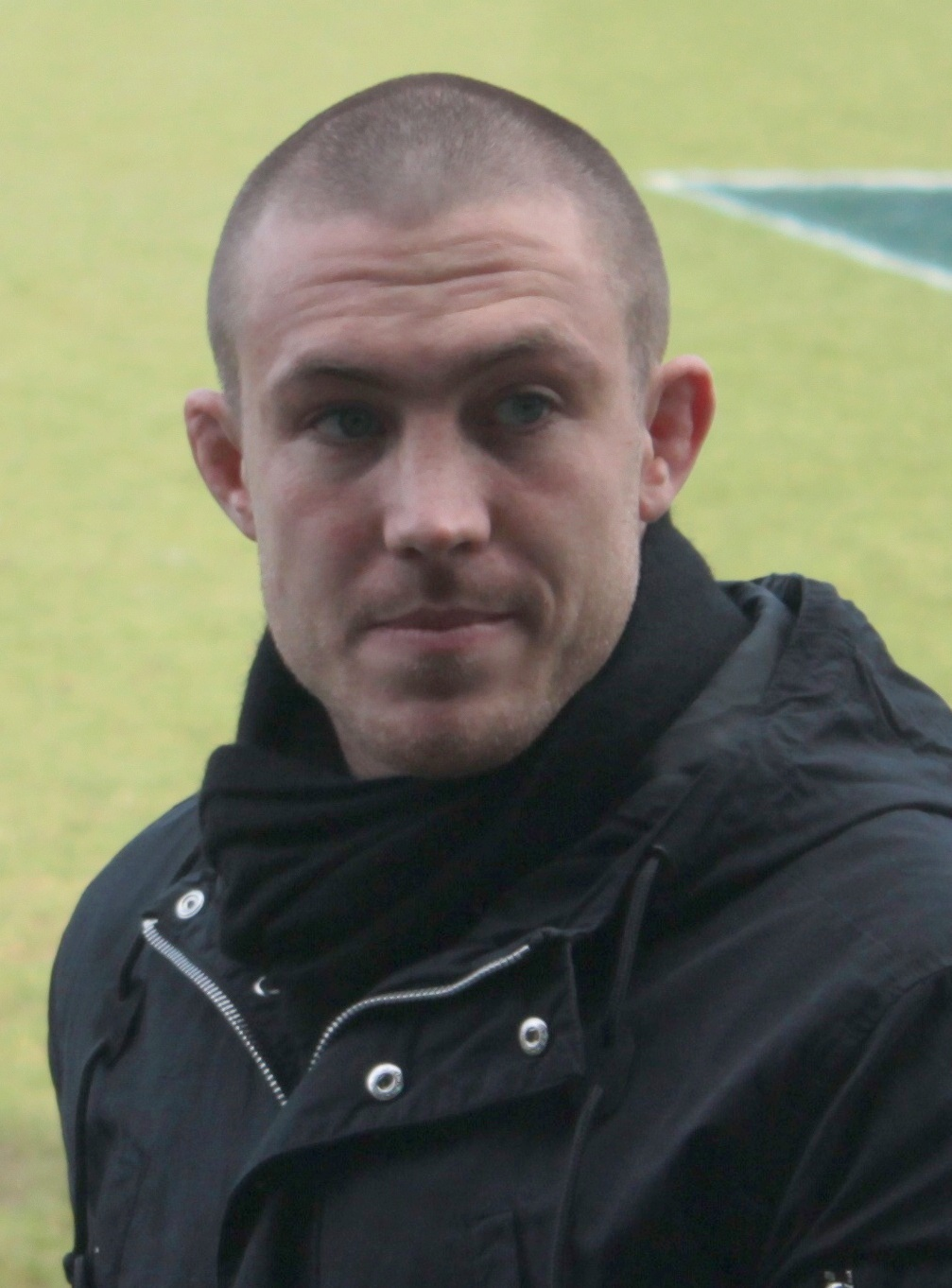
- Brown in 2013
- Born: Michael Noel Brown; 4 September 1985 (age 41) Southampton, England
- Height: 1.83 m (6 ft 0 in)
- Weight: 90 kg (14 st 2 lb; 198 lb)
- School: Peter Symonds College; Wyvern College

Rugby union career
- Position: Fullback / Wing
Youth career
- –: Salisbury
- –: Melksham RFC
Senior career
Years	Team	Apps	(Points)
2005–2021	Harlequins	382	(600)
2021–2022	Newcastle Falcons	16	(10)
2023–2025	Leicester Tigers	33	(40)
- Correct as of 15 June 2025
International career
Years	Team	Apps	(Points)
2007–2018	England	72	(65)
- Correct as of 23 June 2018

Michael Noel Brown (born 4 September 1985) is an English former professional rugby union player who played fullback or wing. Brown joined the Harlequins senior team in 2005, having played youth rugby at Salisbury and Melksham, and played 382 times for the London club. Brown began playing for England two years later and earned 72 caps. Between 2021–2022 Brown played a season for Newcastle Falcons and finished his career for Leicester Tigers. He retired with the fourth most appearances in Premiership Rugby history and eighth most tries.

During his career, he has won 3 Six Nations Championship titles with England and two Premiership titles with Harlequins.

== Early life ==
Born in Southampton, Brown was educated at Wyvern College, until aged 15 when he moved to Peter Symonds College. Having mainly played football and little rugby, he initially wanted to play fly half. Under the coaching of Mike Marchant, he changed position to fullback. This brought him to the attention of Salisbury RFC, where he moved to age 18, before a short stint at Melksham RFC.

Brown played with Melksham for one season, where his dad was a coach. He has cited his time at Melksham as one of his most enjoyable seasons playing rugby and as having contributed significantly to his maturing as a player. He gives significant praise to one individual mentor, Bobby Walsh, whom he credits for setting his standards on nutrition and conditioning.

== Club career ==
Brown made his debut for Harlequins during the 2005/06 season, scoring a try on debut in a pre-season friendly against London Irish on 12 August 2005. He was part of the England Under 21 team that won the 2006 Six Nations Grand Slam and also competed in the Under 21 World Championships later that year. Brown was discovered by Welsh rugby scout Craig Presdee-Salathiel, who contacted his friend Harlequins chairman David Morgan regarding Brown.

In the 2006–07 season, although still in a part of Harlequins' Academy side, he established himself as first choice full back. A standout season by Brown resulted in him collecting 9 tries, earning him a place on the Sky Sports Dream Team.

Brown had a successful 2010–11 season with Quins, culminating in winning the Amlin Challenge cup, beating Munster at Thomand Park on the way to the final against Stade Francais. This form continued into the 2011/12 Aviva Premiership season, resulting in a call up to the EPS squad. He started for Harlequins in their 2011–12 Premiership final victory over Leicester Tigers.

At the start of the 2019/2020 season, while still an active player, one of the bars at Harlequins’ home ground (The Stoop) was renamed in Brown’s honour.

On 4 April 2021, it was confirmed that after 16 years with the club, Brown would officially leave Harlequins and join Newcastle Falcons on a two-year deal ahead of the 2021–22 season.

In January 2023, he signed a short-term contract with Leicester Tigers. He made his debut on 19 February 2023, scoring a try in a 24–18 win against Saracens.

== International career ==
In the 2006–07 season, although still in a part of Harlequins' Academy side, he was capped by the England Saxons in the first two matches of the year.

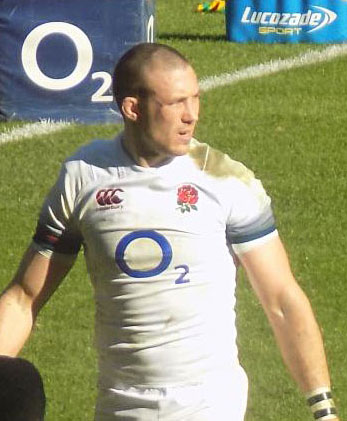
Brown playing for England, 2018

Brown got selected for the 2007 England rugby union tour of South Africa. Unaffected by a severe incidence of food poisoning within the England camp, Brown picked up his first full England cap in the record 58–10 defeat to South Africa. Brown was called into the England Saxons side that defeated Ireland A on 1 February 2008. On 1 June 2008, he started for England against the Barbarians at Twickenham in an uncapped match. On 14 June 2008, he started for England in their 37–20 defeat to New Zealand.

Brown vied with Ben Foden for the England full-back spot in 2012, coming off the bench in the victory over Scotland at Murrayfield. He spent the 2013 Six Nations playing on the left wing with Alex Goode taking the number 15 jersey. He was finally picked at fullback by Stuart Lancaster and was subsequently named England's Man of the Series following his form during the 2013 Autumn Internationals. Brown scored his first try for England in the 2014 Six Nations Championship match against France on 1 February 2014 and his second came a week later in a comprehensive 20–0 victory against Scotland. He then scored two tries and was named Man of the Match for the third time in the tournament in the 52–11 away win over Italy in Rome. In recognition of Brown's form throughout the 2014 Six Nations Championship, he was selected by the general public for the 2014 RBS Six Nations player of the championship award.

Brown was an integral part of the England team that won the RBS Six Nations Championship in 2016 and played every match in the 3–0 series win over Australia.

Brown was named Man of the Match in the England vs Wales' Six Nations game on 10 February 2018.

=== International tries ===
As of 7 July 2019

Try	Opponent	Location	Venue	Competition	Date	Result	Score
1	France	Paris, France	Stade de France	2014 Six Nations	1 February 2014	Loss	26 – 24
2	Scotland	Edinburgh, Scotland	Murrayfield	2014 Six Nations	8 February 2014	Win	20 – 0
3	Italy	Rome, Italy	Stadio Olimpico	2014 Six Nations	15 March 2014	Win	52 – 11
4	Italy	Rome, Italy	Stadio Olimpico	2014 Six Nations	15 March 2014	Win	52 – 11
5	New Zealand	Dunedin, New Zealand	Forsyth Barr Stadium		15 June 2014	Loss	28 – 27
6	Samoa	London, England	Twickenham Stadium		22 November 2014	Win	28 – 9
7	Fiji	London, England	Twickenham Stadium	2015 Rugby World Cup	18 September 2015	Win	35 – 11
8	Fiji	London, England	Twickenham Stadium	2015 Rugby World Cup	18 September 2015	Win	35 – 11
9	Ireland	London, England	Twickenham Stadium	2016 Six Nations	27 February 2016	Win	21 – 10
10	Australia	Sydney, Australia	Sydney Football Stadium		25 June 2016	Win	44 – 40
11	Samoa	London, England	Twickenham Stadium		22 November 2017	Win	48 – 14
12	South Africa	Johannesburg, South Africa	Ellis Park Stadium		9 July 2018	Loss	42 – 39
13	South Africa	Bloemfontein, South Africa	Toyota Stadium		16 July 2018	Loss	23 – 12

== Coaching career ==
In December 2025 Brown was appointed Sporting Director at Esher RFC.

== Personal life ==
Brown married long term partner, Eliza Scarlett Woodcock, the daughter of former England international footballer Tony Woodcock, in summer 2016.
