= Rosemary Squires =

English singer (1928–2023)

- Born: Joan Rosemary Yarrow; 7 December 1928; Bristol, England
- Died: 8 August 2023 (aged 94)
- Genres: Pop, jazz, big band
- Occupation: Singer
- Years active: 1940–2023

Rosemary Squires (born Joan Rosemary Yarrow; 7 December 1928 – 8 August 2023) was an English jazz, big band, cabaret and concert singer and recording artist. Her career started in 1940 with an appearance on the BBC Home Service's Children's Hour, and endured into the 21st century. Squires was also the president of the Studio Theatre in Salisbury, Wiltshire.

== Early life ==
Born in Bristol, England, Squires was the daughter of a civil servant. She took singing, guitar and piano lessons while at school at St Edmund's Girls' School, Salisbury, Wiltshire. Initially she entertained troops by singing on nearby UK and US army bases around Salisbury. With her appealing West Country burr she sang with various musical groups and with a Polish military band, all the while maintaining a job in a shop for antique books and later office work.

== Career ==
When Squires became a professional singer she performed with big bands such as Ted Heath, Geraldo and Cyril Stapleton. She also sang with the smaller jazz bands of Max Harris, Kenny Baker and appeared in the BBC Festival of Jazz at the Royal Albert Hall with the Alan Clare band. She moved from Salisbury to London in 1948 at 20 years of age. In the 1950s and 1960s, she became a regular on the BBC Light Programme (now BBC Radio 2) on programmes such as Melody Time and Workers' Playtime. Squires worked in the United States with Danny Kaye and Sammy Davis Jr., as well as appearing on the Johnny Carson Show. In 1994, Squires was part of the entertainment for Prince Edward's 30th birthday celebrations. During the 2012 Royal Diamond Jubilee year Squires undertook two countrywide tours to celebrate her own diamond jubilee in show business, including two appearances at the Royal Festival Hall.

== Television appearances ==
(incomplete list)

- 1956 in five episodes of Let's Stay Home, an Associated-Rediffusion comedy series.
- 1956 as a guest on The Nixon Line.
- 1958–59 in three episodes of After Hours, a comedy series, with Michael Bentine, Benny Lee and Clive Dunn among others.
- 1959 in Musical Playhouse, a BBC musical series.
- 1962 as a guest singer on Muziek voor U!, a Dutch music programme
- 1964 as a guest on the Arthur Haynes Show.
- 1967 in Hooray for Laughter, with Ted Ray, John Junkin and Reg Varney.
- 1976 in The Good Old Days

== Fairy Liquid jingle ==
In the 1960s, Squires recorded the "Now hands that do dishes …" jingle as part of the Fairy Liquid detergent advertisement. It continued to be used until 2000.

== Personal life and death ==
Squires returned to live in Salisbury in 1983. In 1991, she married Frank Lockyer. She continued to perform at local charity events.

Rosemary Squires died on 8 August 2023, at the age of 94. The announcement of her death was not made until 18 September, in the Salisbury Journal. Her funeral took place on 25 September. Tributes were paid on social media, with founder of Angel Radio Tony Smith recalling a time when Squires heard the station in her car and popped in for an impromptu chat on air.

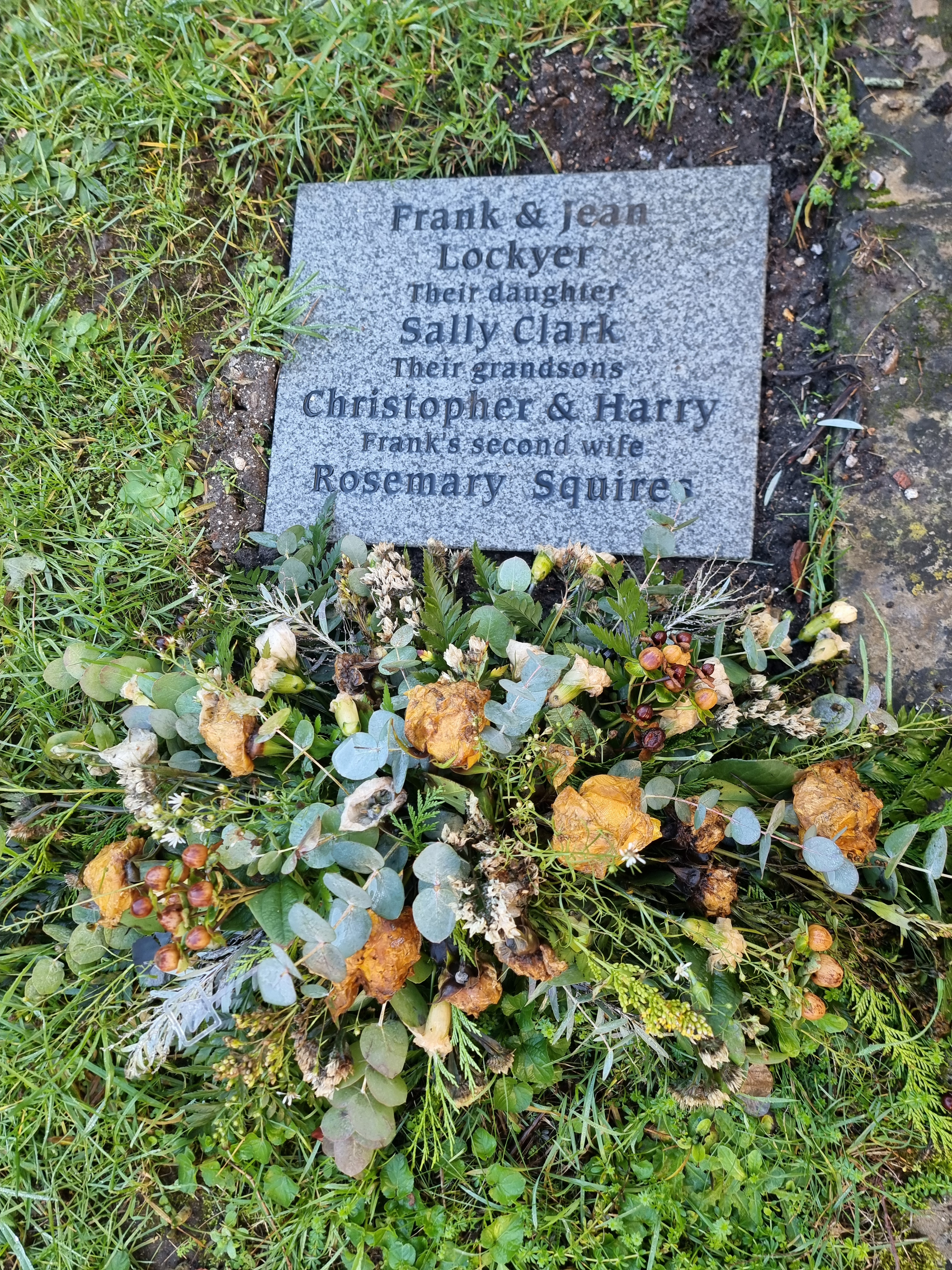
Rosemary Squires' final resting place

== Awards ==
In 1984, Squires was awarded the Gold Badge of Merit by the British Academy of Songwriters, Composers and Authors.

Squires was made a Member of the Order of the British Empire in 2004 for her services to music and charity.

In 2012, she was awarded the British Music Hall Society's Lifetime Achievement Award.

== Discography ==
=== Singles ===
- "Band of Gold", (1956, Decca)
- "You Can't Run Away With It", (1956, Decca)
- "My Love is a Wanderer" EP. (1958, MGM)
- "There Goes My Lover", (1958, HMV)
- "Happy is the Bride", (1958, HMV)
- "Rosemary" EP, (1960, HMV)
- "Our Little Doggie Ran Away", (1961, HMV)
- "Frankfurter Sandwiches" (1961 Columbia) as The Streamliners with Joanne
- "You Got" (1962, HMV)
- "Everything's Coming Up Roses" (1962, HMV)
- "Bluesette", (1964, HMV)
- "Dance Mamma, Dance Pappa, Dance" (Marriage French Style) (1965, United Artists) released only in the US as Joanne and The Streamliners
- "Once There Was You", (1967, Decca)
- "My Way" (1970, President)

=== Albums ===
- Everything's Coming Up Rosy (1963, HMV)
- Something To Remember Me By (1965, HMV)
- Time For Rosemary (1987, Sound Venture)
- My One and Only (1989)
- Swing on a Star (Meridian Records, 1994 & 2009)
- Second Spin (1999)
- The Magic of Rosemary Squires (1999 Decca Gold)
- Shine (2002)
- Ella Fitzgerald Songbook – 15 of 30 tracks (2008 Spotlite)
- Something to Remember Me By (2012, in Japan)
- Everything's Coming Up Rosy (2012, in Japan)
