= Common Platt Greyhound Track =

Greyhound racing track in Swindon, England

- Location: Purton Road, Common Platt, near Purton, Swindon, Wiltshire
- Coordinates: 51°34′52″N 1°50′28″W
- Opened: 1960s
- Closed: 1970s

Common Platt Greyhound Track was a greyhound racing track on Purton Road, Common Platt, near Purton, Swindon, England.

The racing was independent (not affiliated to the sport's governing body, the National Greyhound Racing Club) and the venue was known as a "flapping" track which was the nickname given to independent tracks. The location of the track was behind the Foresters Arms public house (now Casa Paolo) on the B4553.

The track was opened sometime in the late 1960s. Race day was Saturday evening at 6.30pm and the circumference of the track was 440 yards. It was a simple all-grass track with a 'MacWhirter' hare system and race distances of 375, 525 and 600 yards.

The track closed during the 1970s.
