= Purton Stoke =

Village in Wiltshire, England

Coordinates: 51.613°N 1.872°W

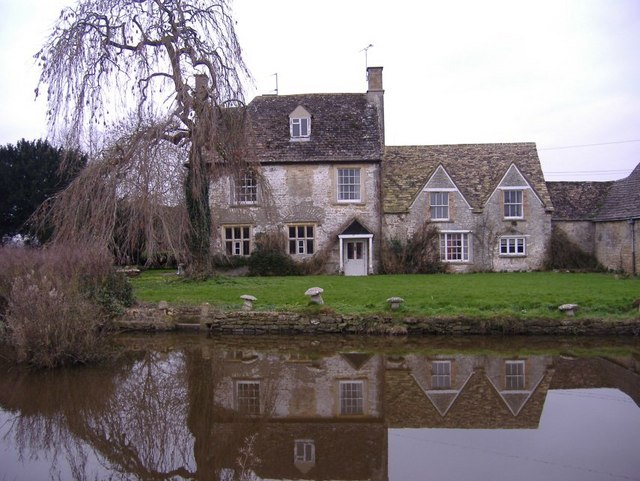
- Pond Farmhouse, Purton Stoke

- Location within Wiltshire
- OS grid reference: SU089905
- Civil parish: Purton
- Unitary authority: Wiltshire
- Ceremonial county: Wiltshire
- Region: South West
- Country: England
- Sovereign state: United Kingdom
- Post town: Swindon
- Postcode district: SN5
- Dialling code: 01793
- Police: Wiltshire
- Fire: Dorset and Wiltshire
- Ambulance: South Western
- UK Parliament: South Cotswolds
- Website: Village

Purton Stoke is a small village in north Wiltshire, England, within the civil parish of Purton. The village lies along a side road off the Purton to Cricklade road, approximately 1.5 miles (2.4 km) north of Purton village. A lane gives access to the nearby hamlet of Bentham, to the southwest.

The River Key, a minor tributary of the Thames, passes close to the west of the village.

== History ==
Pond Farmhouse, south of the village, is from the 16th, 17th and 18th centuries and is on an earlier moated site. The house is Grade II* listed.

During the First World War, the area along with the nearby village of Purton served as Army Remount Service depots. Staff included the illustrator G. Denholm Armour and Scottish-Australian balladist Will H. Ogilvie.

== Amenities ==
Purton Stoke had a Methodist chapel until 2012, when it was sold for use as a private residence. The chapel had opened in 1868, complete with outbuildings for stabling visitors' horses. The building had replaced another chapel which had been built in 1832 in Stoke Street. There was a Quaker meeting house in the village during the late 17th century and early 18th century. The village also has a public house by the name of the Bell, which is a property of the Arkell's Brewery.

Until relatively recently, Purton Stoke had its own primary and junior schools in one building. It opened in 1894 and at its peak had 100 pupils. However, numbers dropped continually from the 1930s when older pupils were educated in Purton, until there were only around 30 pupils left in the 1970s. The school closed in 1978. The building is now used for the Jubilee Gardens Project and is on the Purton to Cricklade road.

== Stoke Common Meadows ==
The Wiltshire Wildlife Trust nature reserve, Stoke Common Meadows, can be found in the vicinity. Situated at the end of Stoke Common Lane (grid reference SU 070 904), the meadows consist of a small wood and grasslands, with ancient hedgerows and ditches. Wildlife found here includes mainly wildflowers: Pepper-saxifrage, sweet vernal-grass, heath spotted-orchid, adder's-tongue fern (Ophioglossum), bugle, ox-eye daisy and common knapweed. Some of the fields are designated as a Site of Special Scientific Interest.

== 'Purton Spa' or the 'Salt Hole' ==
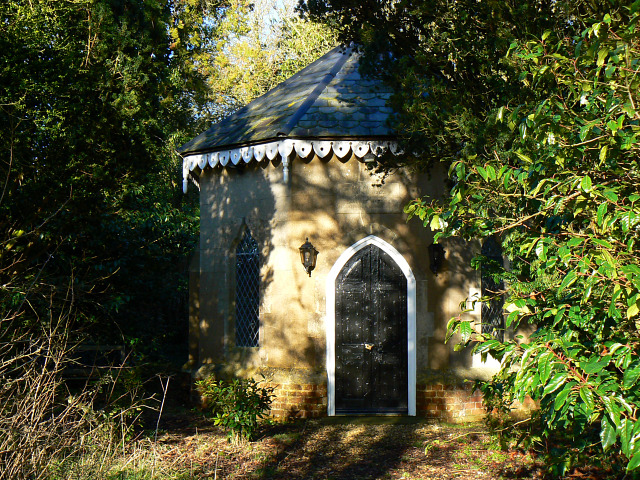
Pump house at the spring

To the west of the village there is a spring, whose mineral waters supposedly carry medicinal properties. The water has a high concentration of lime phosphate. Locals had used the water for centuries for its health benefits; however, when the wealthy landowner, Dr Samuel Champernowne Sadler contracted an illness in the mid-19th century, he tried the water and became markedly better. After this, he erected a pump and octagonal pump house in 1859 and the water was sold commercially, in the 1920s selling for 8d. This continued until World War II, when petrol rationing made the business uneconomical.

== Notable people ==
William Willets (1918–1995), art historian and curator of museums in Singapore and Malaysia, was born in Purton Stoke.
