= Hayes Knoll =

Hamlet in Wiltshire, England

Coordinates: 51.617°N 1.852°W

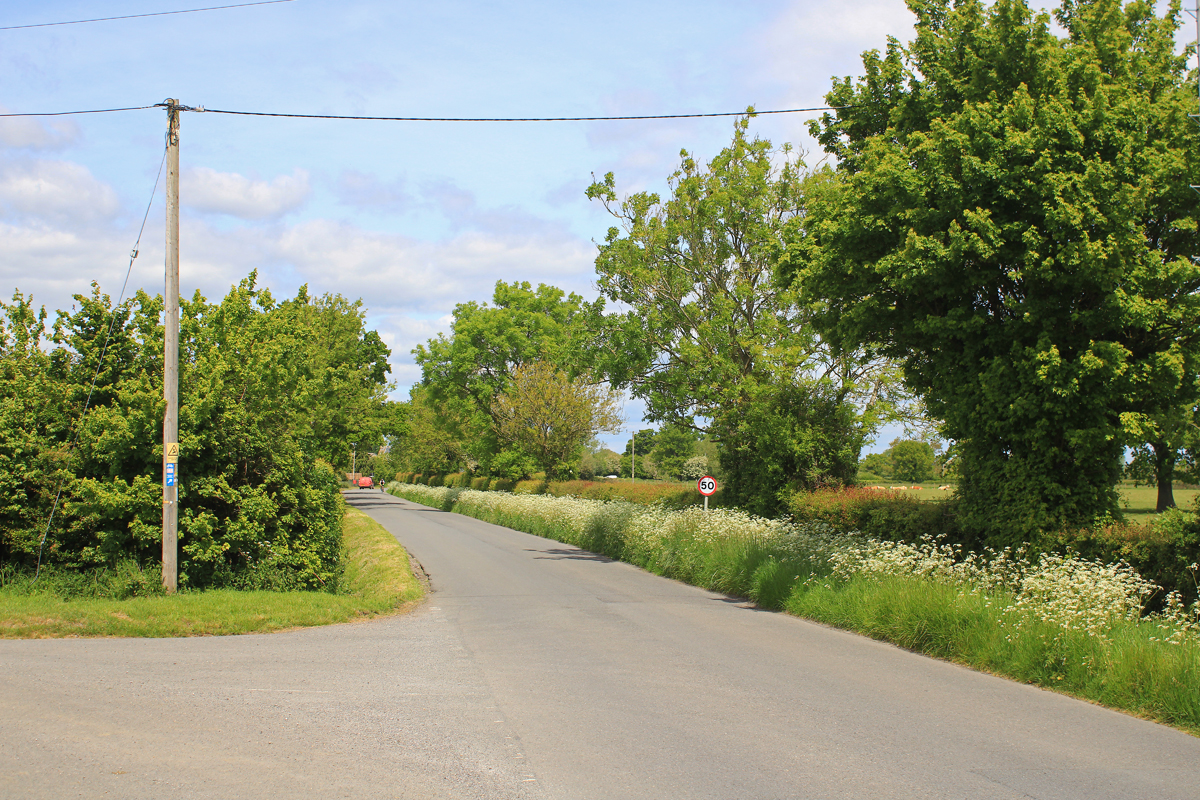
Junction at Newth's Lane and Hayes Knoll Road

Hayes Knoll is a hamlet between Swindon and Cricklade in north Wiltshire, England. It is in the civil parish of Purton, about 0.8 miles (1.3 km) west of the village of Purton Stoke and 2 miles (3.2 km) south of Cricklade.

The North Wilts Canal, which linked the Wilts & Berks Canal at Swindon with the Thames and Severn Canal at Latton, north of Cricklade, passed close to the hamlet, where there was a lock. The canal was opened in 1819 and abandoned in 1914; since 2007 it has been under restoration as part of the Cricklade Country Way.

The hamlet has given its name to Hayes Knoll station on the Swindon and Cricklade Railway.
