= Battle of Badon =

British 6th-century battle

Battle of Mount Badon
- Part of the Anglo-Saxon conquest of Britain
Date	Unknown, c. 500–504 AD
Location	Unknown, various locations proposed
Result	Brittonic victory

Belligerents
Romano-Britons; Celtic Britons	Anglo-Saxons

Commanders and leaders
Unknown (Ambrosius Aurelianus and/or Arthur)	Unknown

The Battle of Badon, also known as the Battle of Mons Badonicus, (Note: Latin: obsessio[nis] Badonici montis, "Blockade/Siege of the Badonic Hill"; Bellum in monte Badonis, "Battle on Badon Hill"; Bellum Badonis, "Battle of Badon"; Old Welsh: Badon; Middle Welsh: Gweith Vadon, "Battle of Badon"; Welsh: Brwydr Mynydd Baddon, "Battle of Badon Mount/Hill") was purportedly fought between Britons and Anglo-Saxons in Post-Roman Britain during the early 6th century. It was credited as a major victory for the Britons, stopping the westward encroachment of the Anglo-Saxon kingdoms for a period.

The earliest known references to the battle, by the British cleric Gildas, was written c. 543–547. It is chiefly known today for the involvement of the man who would later be remembered as the legendary King Arthur. His name is not known, although the name under the form "Arthur" first appears in the 9th-century Historia Brittonum, where he is mentioned as having participated in the battle alongside the Brittonic kings as a war commander, though is not described as a king himself. Because of the limited number of sources, there is no certainty about the date, location, or details of the fighting apart from the result being a victory for the Britons.

Almost all scholars agree that this battle did take place. Gildas wrote within living memory of the battle (he claims to have been born in the same year it was fought). But being a moralist, he does not mention Arthur or the names of other British leaders who took part, nor does he provide the names of the Saxon leaders. Gildas also does not describe it as an actual open battle, but rather as a siege.

== Historical accounts ==
=== Gildas ===
The earliest mention of the Battle of Badon appears in Gildas' De Excidio et Conquestu Britanniae (On the Ruin and Conquest of Britain). In it, the Anglo-Saxons are said to have "dipped [their] red and savage tongue in the western ocean" before Ambrosius Aurelianus organized a British resistance with the survivors of the initial Saxon onslaught. Gildas describes the period that followed Ambrosius' initial success:

From that time, the citizens were sometimes victorious, sometimes the enemy, in order that the Lord, according to His wont, might try in this nation the Israel of today, whether it loves Him or not. This continued up to the year of the siege of Badon Hill (obsessionis Badonici montis), and of almost the last great slaughter inflicted upon the rascally crew. And this commences, a fact I know, as the forty-fourth year, with one month now elapsed; it is also the year of my birth.

De Excidio Britanniae describes the battle as such an "unexpected recovery of the [island]" that it caused kings, nobles, priests, and commoners to "live orderly according to their several vocations." Afterwards, the long peace degenerated into civil wars and the iniquity of Maelgwn Gwynedd.

That Arthur had gone unmentioned by Gildas, ostensibly the source closest to his own time, was noticed at least as early as a 12th-century hagiography of Gildas which claims that Gildas had praised Arthur extensively but then excised him completely after Arthur killed the saint's brother, Hueil mab Caw. Modern writers have suggested the details of the battle may have been so well known that Gildas expected his audience to be familiar with them.

=== Bede ===
The battle is next mentioned in an 8th-century text of Bede's Ecclesiastical History of the English People (Historia Ecclesiastica Gentis Anglorum), which describes the "siege of Mount Badon, when they made no small slaughter of those invaders," as occurring 44 years after the first Anglo-Saxon settlement of Britain. Bede refers to Ambrosius Aurelianus as the leader of the Britons at that battle, whose parents had perished 'in the storm' and who were 'of the royal race'. Since Bede places that arrival just before, during or just after the joint reign in Rome of Marcian and Valentinian III in AD 449–456, (Note: Per Bede's account. The actual dates of their reign were AD 450–455.) he must have considered Badon to have taken place between 493 and 500. Bede then puts off discussion of the battle – "But more of this hereafter" – only to seemingly never return to it.

Bede does later include an extended account of Saint Germanus of Auxerre's victory over the Saxons and Picts in a mountain valley (traditionally placed at Mold in Flintshire in northeast Wales), which he credits with curbing the threat of invasion for a generation. However, as the victory is described as having been accomplished bloodlessly, it was presumably a different occasion from Badon. Accepted at face value, Saint Germanus' involvement would also place the battle around AD 430, although Bede's chronology shows no knowledge of this.

=== Nennius and the Welsh Annals ===
The earliest surviving text specifically mentioning Arthur in connection with the battle is the early 9th-century Historia Brittonum (The History of the Britons), attributed to the Welsh monk Nennius, in which the soldier (Latin mīles) Arthur is identified as the leader of the victorious British force at Badon:

The twelfth battle was on Mount Badon in which there fell in one day 960 men from one charge by Arthur; and no one struck them down except Arthur himself.

The Battle of Badon is next mentioned in the Annales Cambriae (Annals of Wales), assumed to have been written during the mid- to late-10th century. The entry states:

The Battle of Badon, in which Arthur carried the Cross of our Lord Jesus Christ for three days and three nights upon his shoulders [or shield] (Note: The words for "shoulder" and "shield" are easily confused in Old Welsh: scuit (shield) vs. scuid (shoulder)]. Cf. Jones, W. Lewis. The Cambridge History of English and American Literature in 18 Volumes, Vol. I, XII, §2. Putnam, 1921. Accessed 30 January 2013.) and the Britons were the victors.

=== Geoffrey of Monmouth ===
Geoffrey of Monmouth's c. 1136 Historia Regum Britanniae (The History of the Kings of Britain) was massively popular and survives in many copies from soon after its composition. (Note: The earliest two being the Cambridge 1706 II.I.14 and Berne Stadtbibliotek MS 568, both apparently from the year of composition. Cf. Griscom, Acton. The Historia Regum Britanniae of Geoffrey of Monmouth. Longmans, Green, & Co., 1929. Accessed 7 February 2013.) Going into (and fabricating) much greater detail, Geoffrey closely identifies Badon with Bath, including having Merlin foretell that Badon's baths would lose their hot water and turn poisonous. He also mixes in aspects of other accounts: the battle begins as a Saxon siege and then becomes a normal engagement once Arthur's men arrive; Arthur bears the image of the Virgin both on his shield and shoulder. Arthur charges and kills 470, ten more than the number of Britons ambushed by Hengist near Salisbury.

Elements of the Welsh legends are added: in addition to the shield Pridwen, Arthur gains his sword, Caliburnus (Excalibur), and his spear, Ron. Geoffrey also makes the defence of the city from the Saxon sneak attack a holy cause, having Dubricius offer absolution of all sins for those who fall in battle.

== Scholarship ==
There is considerable scholarly debate as to the exact date and location of the battle, though most agree that it took place in southern England sometime around the turn of the sixth century.

=== Date ===
Dates proposed by scholars for the battle include 493, 501 and 516. Daniel McCarthy and Dáibhí Ó Cróinín have posited that Gildas' 44 years and one month is not a reference to the simple chronology but a position within the 84-year Easter cycle used for computus at the time by the Britons and the Irish church. The tables in question begin in January 438, which would place their revised date of the battle in February 482.

Andrew Breeze, in a 2020 book, argues that the Battle of Badon or "Braydon, Wiltshire" took place in 493, deducing that Gildas was writing De Excidio in 536, in the middle of the extreme weather events of 535–536, because he cited a "certain thick mist and black night" which "sits upon the whole island" of Britain, but not the subsequent famine in the year 537. Breeze concluded that Badon was fought "(...) in southern Britain, was fought in 493 and had nothing to do with Arthur."

=== Location ===
Following Monmouth, Mount Badon’s location has traditionally been sited in the hills around Bath, such as Bathampton Down. Tim and Annette Burkitt have proposed Caer Badden (Latin: Aquae Sulis; now Bath, Somerset), some 20 miles northeast of the Roman mines at Charterhouse.

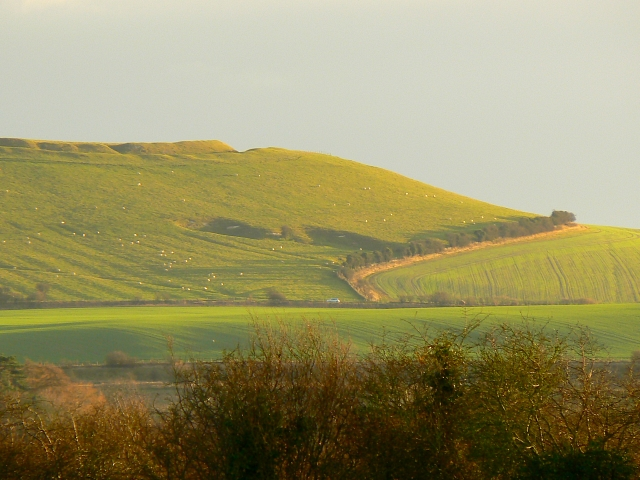
Liddington Castle site. The ramparts of the Iron Age hillfort can be seen at the highest point of the skyline.

Susan Hirst, Geoffrey Ashe and Michael Wood argue for the site of Liddington Castle on the hill above Badbury (Old English: Baddan byrig) in Wiltshire west of Swindon. This site, an Iron Age hill fort, is strategic seeing as it commands The Ridgeway, which connects the River Thames with the River Avon and River Severn beyond. The similarly named Badbury Rings in Dorset have also been argued to be the location of the battle. David Cooper agrees that this is the most likely site and has provided the most comprehensive analysis of the battle available to date.

From a very different approach, Andrew Breeze also put forward a site near Swindon: arguing that Badon must be etymologically Brythonic rather than English (thus eliminating Bath from consideration as its name is entirely Germanic) and that Gildas's toponym (Badonici Montis) is a corruption of Bradonici Montis, Breeze posits Ringsbury Camp near Braydon northwest of Swindon as the site of the battle.

A number of scholars have suggested locations outside southern England. William Forbes Skene believed the battle to have occurred at a substantial hillfort on Bowden Hill near Linlithgow on the basis of it overlooking one of Britain's many River Avons, specifically the Avon in Falkirk. Thomas Green proposed a site near Baumber in Lincolnshire (recorded as Badeburg in the Domesday Book) on the basis of archaeological evidence for a major early Saxon presence in the region and the similarity of the ambiguous phrase "in regione Linnuis", used for a site in Nennius' list of Arthur's battles, believed by some to refer to the Roman name for Lincoln (Lindum Colonia) and the subsequent early English Kingdom of Lindsey. Archaeologist Keith Fitzpatrick-Matthews described Green's proposal as "so far removed from the mainstream yet based on sound reasoning that it deserves serious consideration." Bernard Mees proposes on linguistic grounds that the sources for the Historia Brittonum were of northern origin, and that of hillforts containing the element "Bad", Arbury Camp in Northamptonshire is a possibility.

=== Possible Saxon commander ===
Some authors have speculated that Ælle of Sussex may have led the Saxon forces at this battle. Others reject the idea out of hand. In book 9 of his work Historia regum Britanniae, Geoffrey of Monmouth mentions a certain Cheldric as a Saxon war leader who fought at Bath during the same period, so other scholars suggest that (due to similarities of names) Cerdic of Wessex was the Saxon leader during the battle.

== Second Badon ==
The A Text of the Annales Cambriae includes the entry: "The first celebration of Easter among the Saxons. The second battle of Badon. Morgan dies." The date for this action is given in the Annales Cambriae as AD 665. However, the B Text does not include the text mentioning "the second Badon".

== Romance depiction ==
The 13th-century Vulgate Cycle, a French prose romance retelling of the Arthurian legend, replaced the Battle of Badon with the Battle of Clarence (spelling variants: Clarance, Clarans, Clarenche, Clarens). In the first round of fighting, a coalition of British kings is defeated by the Saxons (or the Saracens in some subsequent versions, including that by Thomas Malory). In the second phase, Arthur joins the battle and enemy forces are destroyed, driving invaders into the sea.

== Local lore ==
Apart from the professional scholarship, various communities throughout Wales and England have their own traditions maintaining that their area was the site of the battle. These include (besides Badbury Rings and Bathampton Down), the mountain of Mynydd Baedan near Maesteg in South Wales, and Bowden Hill in Wiltshire.

== Modern depictions ==
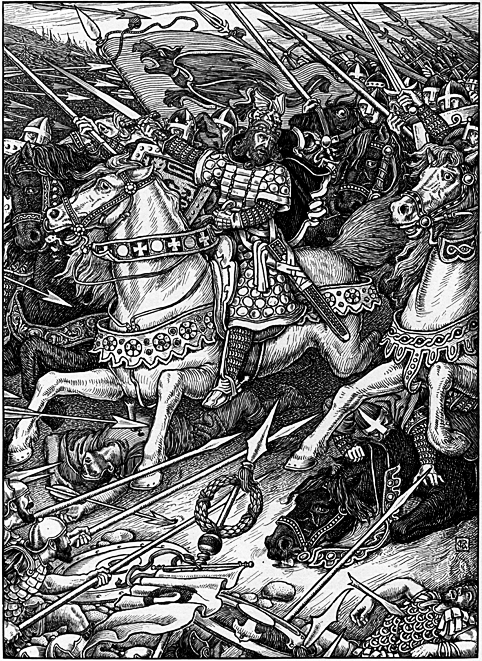
Arthur leading the cavalry charge at Mount Badon in Louis Rhead's 1898 illustration for Tennyson's Idylls of the King

- King Arthur leads the Knights of the Round Table into battle against the Saxons led by Hengist in the Prince Valiant comic strip series episodes 1430 (5 July 1964) and following.
- The battle is mentioned in the 1975 comedy film Monty Python and the Holy Grail as one of the many questionable feats of Sir Robin, who in the film's bardic narration is said to have "personally wet himself at the Battle of Badon Hill".
- The battle is featured prominently in 1997's Excalibur: A Novel of Arthur by Bernard Cornwell, in the book's second part, "Mynydd Baddon", in which the armies of Angle and Saxon kings Aelle and Cerdic, aided by Celtic traitors led by Lancelot, are defeated in an epic battle by an uneasy alliance of various British and Irish kingdoms. The author combines various medieval accounts of the battle, such as it beginning as an Anglo-Saxon siege of a hilltop (here initially desperately defended by Guinevere, who is depicted as a brilliant strategist and rallying figure) and having Arthur's cavalry appear with the sign of the cross on their shields (here a requisite demanded by the Christian king Tewdric for him to also join the battle), to create a more grounded and realistic depiction than the ones from his medieval sources.
- The 2004 film King Arthur ends in a climactic battle scene occurring along Hadrian's Wall as the mostly Romano-British forces of Arthur defeat those of the Saxon kings Cerdic and Cynric, at a heavy cost to Arthur.
- The 2017 film Transformers: The Last Knight opens with a depiction of the battle where King Arthur and his knights are assisted by Cybertronian knights in repelling the Anglo-Saxon invaders. This scene is later referenced in dialogue by Anthony Hopkins character Sir Edmund Burton.

== See also ==
- Battle of Camlann (Salisbury), King Arthur's final fight in his legend

== Sources ==
- Green, Thomas (2007). Concepts of Arthur. Stroud, Gloucestershire: Tempus. ISBN 9780752444611.
