= Widham =

Hamlet in England

Coordinates: 51.593°N 1.871°W

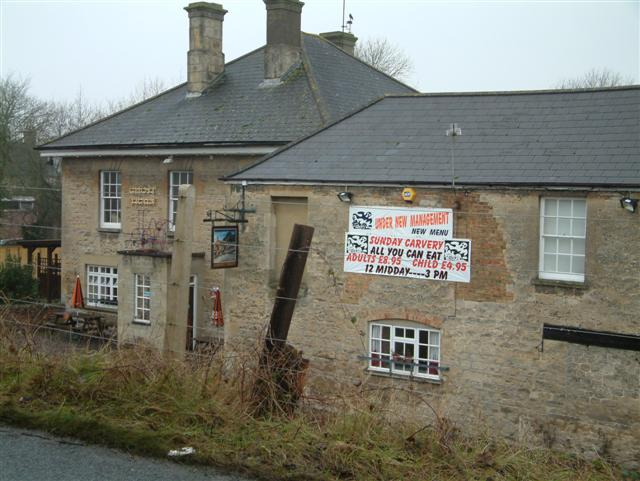
The Ghost Train pub in 2006

Widham is a hamlet now encompassed within the village and parish of Purton, Wiltshire, England.

== History ==
Originally, Widham consisted of a few houses north of Purton along the Cricklade road, parts of Witts Lane, and the toll house at Collins Lane, with Widham Common in the centre. In time, Purton engulfed the hamlet, and only one small area remained as Widham. This, in turn, was divided in the mid-19th century by the Cheltenham and Great Western Union Railway which today provides a route from Swindon to Gloucester.

A related place name, Widhill, in the parish of Cricklade, can be found approximately 4 miles to the north near the A419 at Blunsdon.

During the period of the inclosure acts, the common at Widham was awarded to the Earls of Shaftesbury along with 'foot rights' to the cottages around the common to the highway (which had been a private road with tolls collected at the toll house). The highway then became a public road. Tolls, however, continued to be collected into the late 19th century.

Pincocks Orchard, one of the last remaining private orchards in Purton and dating to the 18th century, lies behind the houses to the south of the railway. It was originally Thomas Pincock's orchard, but is now reduced in size to around half an acre. It is planted with greengage and other fruit trees.

Widham is shown in current Ordnance Survey maps as well as maps dating back to the 18th century, such as Andrews' and Drury's Map of Wiltshire, 1773, Andrews' and Drury's Map of Wiltshire, 1810 and the 1896 OS map.

== Etymology ==
The name Widham derives the words 'druid' and 'hamlet'. The word dru-wid means 'oak-knowledge', while 'ham' means homestead or peninsula (on the Andrews' & Drury's maps, 1773 and 1810, Widham can be seen lying between two small rivers/streams leading into the River Key which joins the Thames at Cricklade).

The suffix 'ham' could be derived from one of two words: ham, the Saxon word meaning 'settlement', or hamm, meaning 'water meadow'. A 'ham' can also be a geographical feature roughly corresponding to a peninsula surrounded on three sides, usually by marsh. In the case at hand, such an ancient marsh may have later been drained to become a meadow as in the present day.
