= Distillery Farm Meadows =

Nature reserve in Wiltshire, England

Coordinates: 51.60703°N 1.95519°W

Distillery Farm Meadows (grid reference SU032898) is an 18.7 hectare biological Site of Special Scientific Interest in Wiltshire, notified in 1988.

The site is managed as a nature reserve by Wiltshire Wildlife Trust.

== Sources ==
- Natural England citation sheet for the site (accessed 24 March 2022)
