= Emmett Hill Meadows =

Site of Special Scientific Interest in Wiltshire, England

Coordinates: 51.60973°N 1.98840°W

Emmett Hill Meadows (grid reference SU009901) is a 5.1 hectare biological Site of Special Scientific Interest in Wiltshire, notified in 1987.

The site is managed as a nature reserve by Wiltshire Wildlife Trust.

== Sources ==
- Natural England citation sheet for the site (accessed 24 March 2022)
