= Restrop Farm and Brockhurst Wood =

Protected area in Wiltshire, England

Coordinates: 51.57822°N 1.89605°W

Restrop Farm and Brockhurst Wood (grid reference SU073866) is a 56.5 hectare biological Site of Special Scientific Interest in Wiltshire, England, about one mile (1.6 km) south-west of Purton village.

The SSSI was notified in 1992, for its diverse habitat which includes unimproved hay meadows, permanent pasture, mature hedgerows and ancient woodland.

The site is on the southern and western slopes of a hill. On the top of the hill is the Iron Age hillfort called Ringsbury Camp.
