= Brandier =

Hamlet in Wiltshire, England

Coordinates: 51.625°N 1.981°W

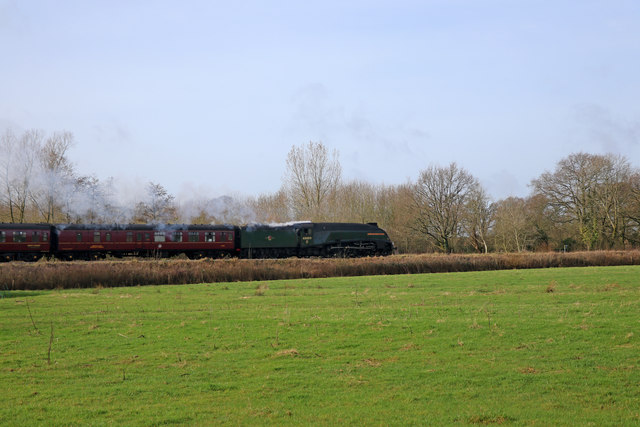
- Train passing through Brandier

- Location within Wiltshire
- OS grid reference: SU01419180
- Civil parish: Minety
- Unitary authority: Wiltshire
- Ceremonial county: Wiltshire
- Region: South West
- Country: England
- Sovereign state: United Kingdom
- Post town: Malmesbury
- Postcode district: SN16
- Dialling code: 01666
- Police: Wiltshire
- Fire: Dorset and Wiltshire
- Ambulance: South Western
- UK Parliament: South Cotswolds

Brandier is a hamlet in north Wiltshire, England, in Minety parish. It lies a short distance north-east of Upper Minety and is bisected by the Swindon to Kemble railway.

Brandier was the site of extensive Roman kilns and potteries which supplied the nearby regional capital of Corinium (Cirencester) with ceramic building materials. 'Minety Ware' was in production until at least the medieval period and has been found as far afield as Germany.

The hamlet once stood at a crossroads, one road of which, Crow Lane, is now a public right of way. The other, where Crossing Lane is today, roughly corresponds to the Roman road leading to Cirencester, where it connects with the Fosse Way. Until the Counties (Detached Parts) Act 1844, the hamlet was in Gloucestershire.

The largest dwelling in the hamlet is Brandiers Farm, mostly dating from the 16th century although excavations have shown it to have been built on extensive Roman foundations, making it arguably the oldest building in the parish.
