= Homington and Coombe Bissett Downs =

Nature reserve in Wiltshire, England

Coordinates: 51.01978°N 1.85310°W

Homington and Coombe Bissett Downs (grid reference SU104245) is a 25.0 hectare biological Site of Special Scientific Interest in Wiltshire, notified in 1971.

Coombe Bissett Downs is managed as a nature reserve by Wiltshire Wildlife Trust.

== Sources ==
- Natural England citation sheet for the site (accessed 1 April 2022)
