= Clattinger Farm =

Nature reserve in Wiltshire, England

Coordinates: 51.63850°N 1.98406°W

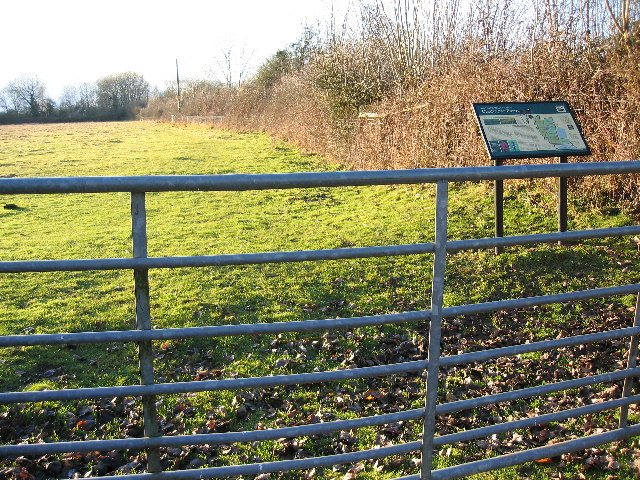
Aspect of the Clattinger Farm Site of Special Scientific Interest, currently managed by Wiltshire Wildlife.

Clattinger Farm (grid reference SU012933) is a 60.3 hectare biological Site of Special Scientific Interest in Wiltshire, notified in 1971.

The site is managed as a nature reserve by Wiltshire Wildlife Trust.

== Sources ==
- Natural England citation sheet for the site (accessed 23 March 2022)
