= St Joseph's Catholic School, Laverstock =

St Joseph's Catholic School

Location
- Church Road; Laverstock, Wiltshire, SP1 1QY; England
- Coordinates: 51.0827°N 1.7706°W

Information
- Type: Voluntary aided school
- Religious affiliation: Roman Catholic
- Local authority: Wiltshire Council
- Department for Education URN: 126473 Tables
- Ofsted: Reports
- Headteacher: Matthew Higgins
- Gender: Coeducational
- Age: 11 to 16
- Enrolment: 609 as of October 2024
- Houses: Margaret, Vincent, Teresa, Francis
- Colour: Blue
- Website: www.sjcs.org.uk

St Joseph's Catholic School is a coeducational Roman Catholic secondary school in Laverstock, near Salisbury in Wiltshire, England.

It is a voluntary aided school administered by Wiltshire Council and the Roman Catholic Diocese of Clifton. The school offers GCSEs and BTECs as programmes of study for pupils.
