= St Edmund's Girls' School =

St Edmund's C.E. Girls School
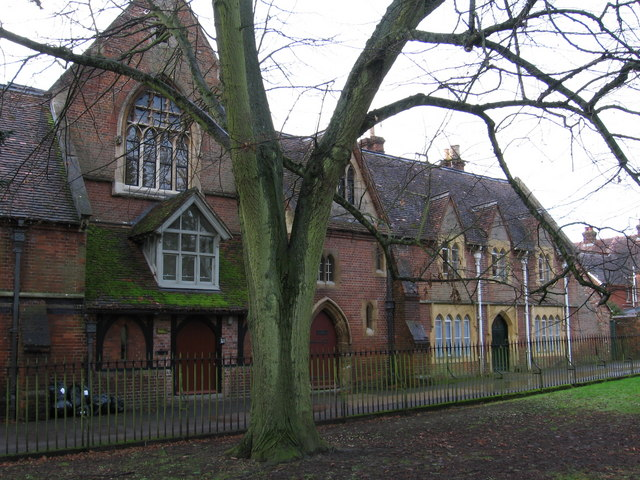
- The old building

Location
- Church Road, Laverstock; Salisbury, Wiltshire, SP1 1RD; England
- Coordinates: 51°04′49″N 1°46′16″W

Information
- Type: Academy
- Religious affiliation: Church of England
- Established: 1815
- Closed: 2022
- Local authority: Wiltshire Council
- Department for Education URN: 137827 Tables
- Ofsted: Reports
- Gender: Girls
- Age: 11 to 16
- Website: www.st-edmunds.eu

St Edmund's Girls' School was an all-girls secondary school located in Laverstock, near Salisbury, south Wiltshire, England. In 2022, the school formally merged with Wyvern College to form Wyvern St Edmund's.

== History ==
There was a St Edmund's school in 1815, associated with St Edmund's Church, Bedwin Street, in central Salisbury. (The church became Salisbury Arts Centre in 1975). The school's first permanent site was a National School built in 1860 to the west of the church. Alterations to the school in 1896 increased its capacity to 675 places. On reorganization of education in the city in 1926, the school catered for 350 girls aged 11 and over. Further changes in 1944 turned the school into a secondary modern, which in 1951 became voluntary controlled. The former school building is Grade II* listed.

The school's new building in Church Road, Laverstock, was completed in 1964 and became St Edmund's Church of England Girls' School. It gained academy status in 2012. Built for 480 pupils, the school was then extended to accommodate 800 places.

In April 2017, the school joined the adjacent Wyvern College boys' school in the Magna Learning Partnership, a multi-academy trust. From September 2018 the two schools operated as a single mixed school called Wyvern St Edmund's, pooling their leadership, staff and buildings, although retaining their separate legal identities.

In September 2022 the two schools formally and legally amalgamated as Wyvern St Edmund's.
