= Cloatley Manor Farm Meadows =

Nature reserve in Wiltshire, England

Coordinates: 51.60930°N 2.0281°W

Cloatley Manor Farm Meadows (grid reference ST981910) is a 12.1 hectare biological Site of Special Scientific Interest in Wiltshire, notified in 1997.

The site is managed as a nature reserve by Wiltshire Wildlife Trust.

== Sources ==
- Natural England citation sheet for the site (accessed 23 March 2022)
