= Acres Farm Meadow =

Protected area in Wiltshire, England

Coordinates: 51.63311°N 1.96672°W

Acres Farm Meadow (grid reference SU024927) is a 4.2 hectare biological Site of Special Scientific Interest (SSSI) in Wiltshire, notified in 1989. It lies between the villages of Somerford Keynes and Minety. The SSSI is the former site of a mediaeval ridge and furrow system which lies on the Upper Jurassic Oxford Clay. The site is home to grasses, sedges and herbs. Trees such as oak, maple, English elm (when notified, prior to Dutch elm disease) and hawthorn can be found in the hedgerows on the site, which provide nesting sites for lesser whitethroat, willow warbler, yellowhammer and bullfinch.
