= Ravensroost Wood =

Woodland in Wiltshire, England

Coordinates: 51.59265°N 1.96964°W

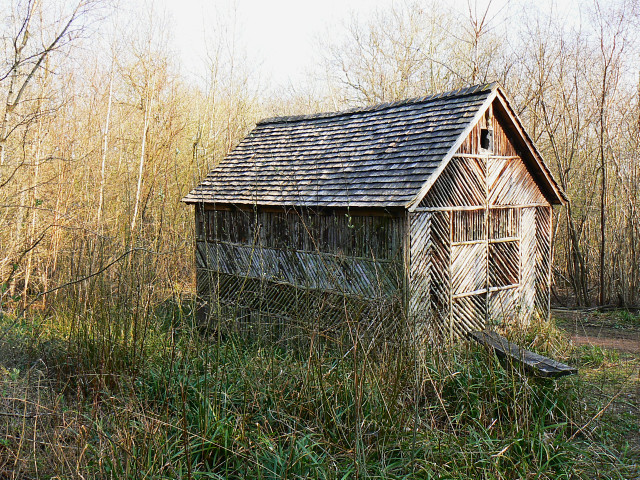
A building in Ravensroost Wood

Ravensroost Wood (grid reference SU022882) is a 43.7 hectare biological Site of Special Scientific Interest in north Wiltshire, England. The site lies about 1.5 miles (2.4 km) south of Minety village and straddles the boundary between Minety and Braydon parishes.

The wood is the largest remnant of Braydon Forest and has benefited from many years of consistent management. It has a variety of trees, shrubs and ground flora.

The site was notified in 1989 and is managed – together with meadows to the north and south – as a nature reserve by Wiltshire Wildlife Trust.
