= Jones's Mill =

Nature reserve in Wiltshire, England

Coordinates: 51.35053°N 1.76015°W

Jones's Mill (grid reference SU168613) is an 11.6 hectare biological Site of Special Scientific Interest near Pewsey in Wiltshire, notified in 1975.

The site is managed as a nature reserve by Wiltshire Wildlife Trust.

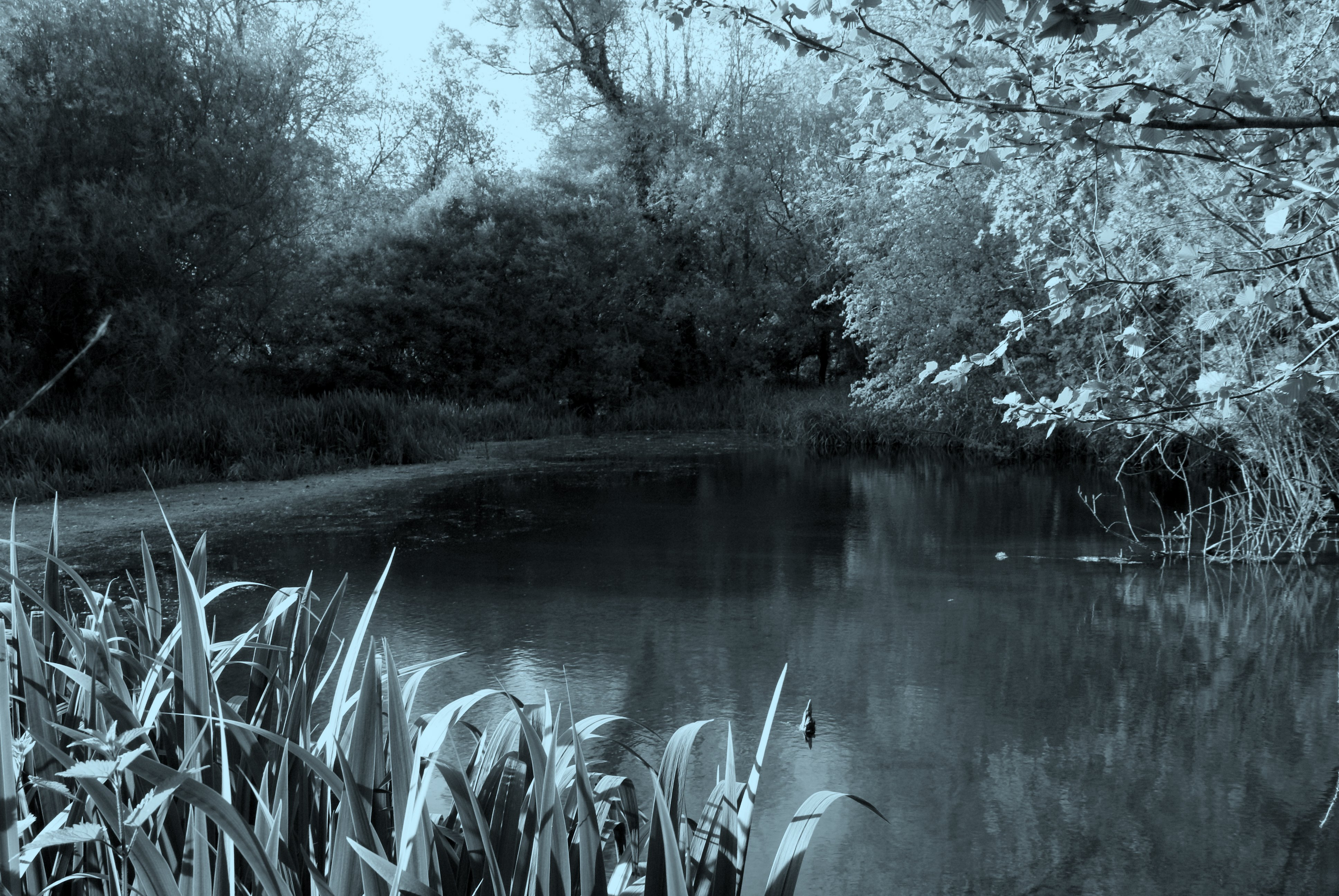
Small lake inside the reserve

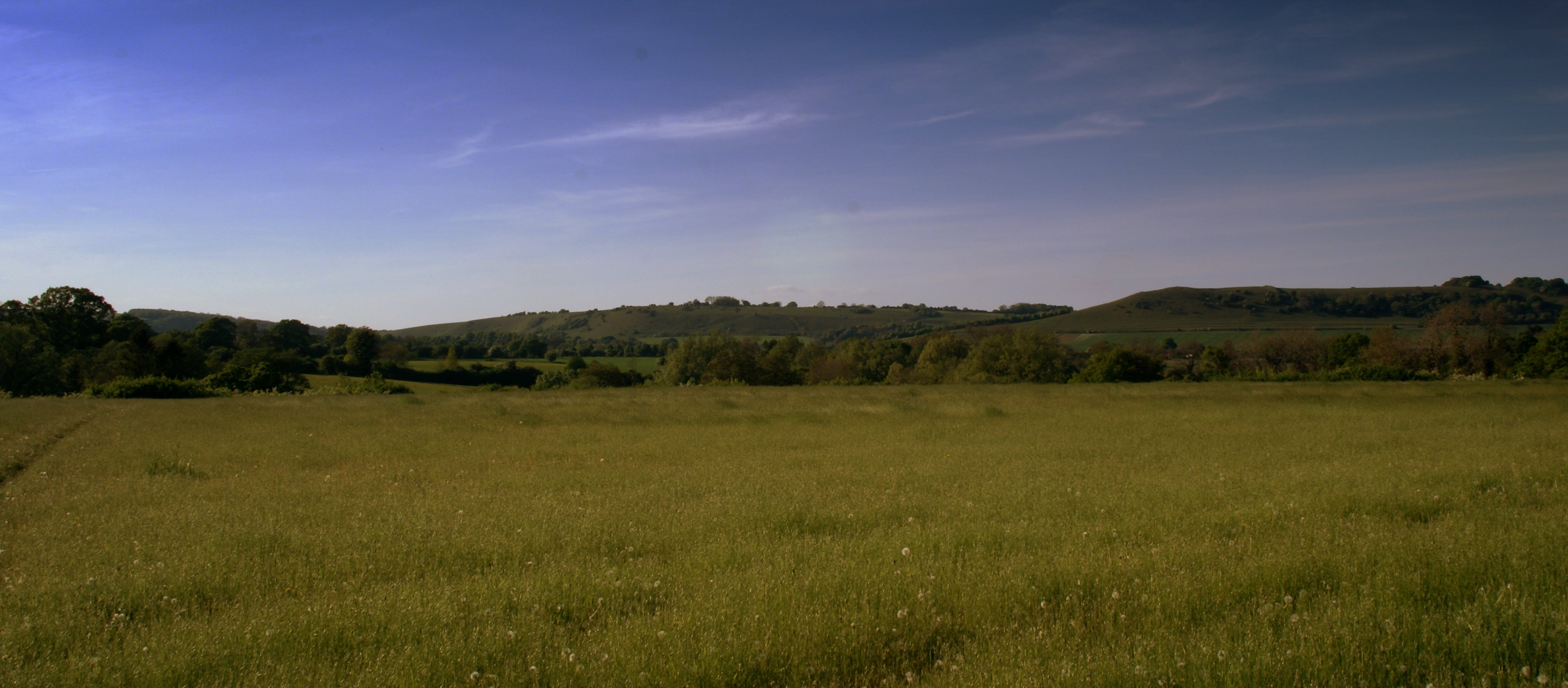
Looking north towards the Kennet and Avon Canal

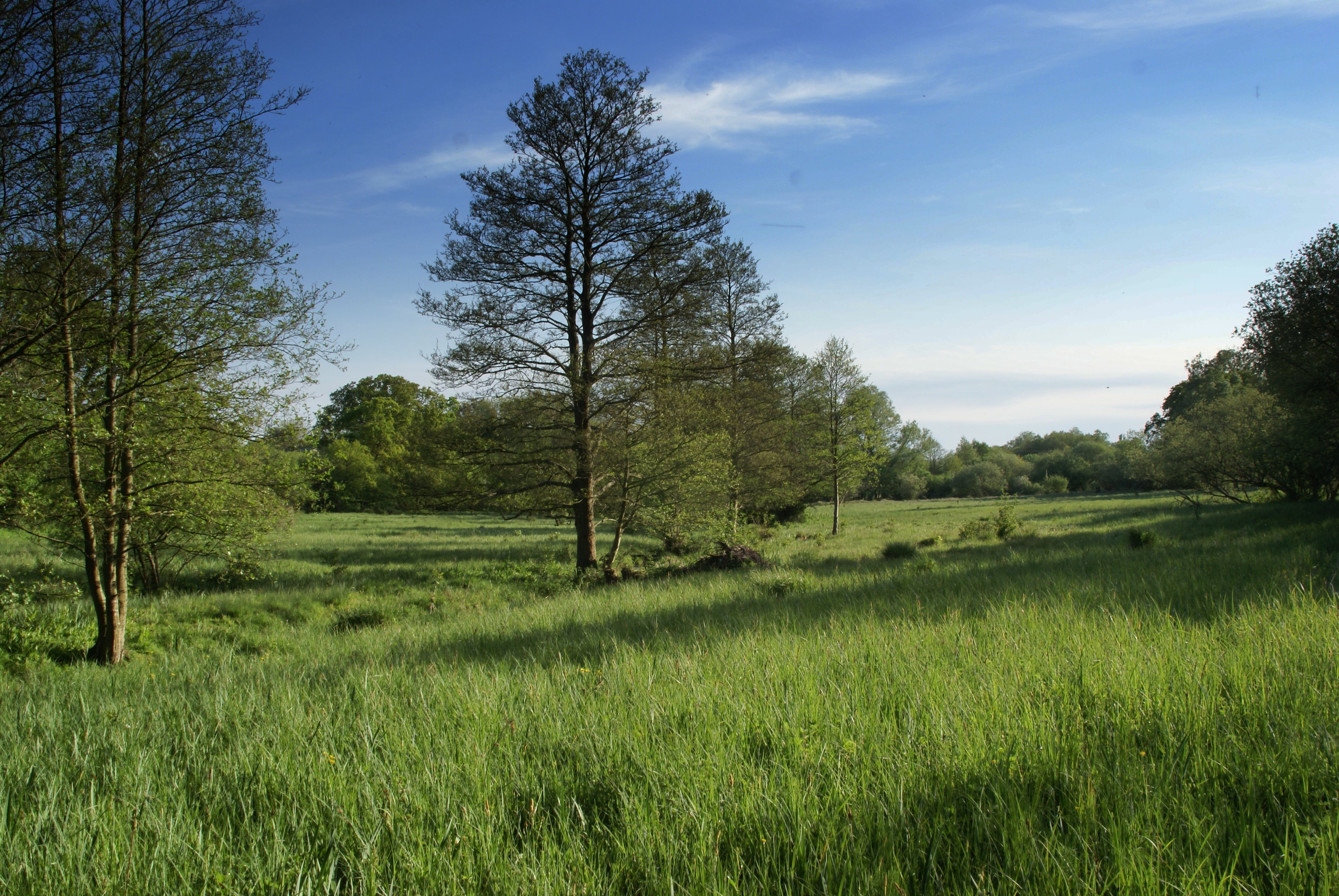
Looking west towards Pewsey

== Sources ==
- Natural England citation sheet for the site (accessed 7 April 2022)
