= Stoke Common Meadows =

Protected area in Wiltshire, England

Coordinates: 51.61239°N 1.90897°W

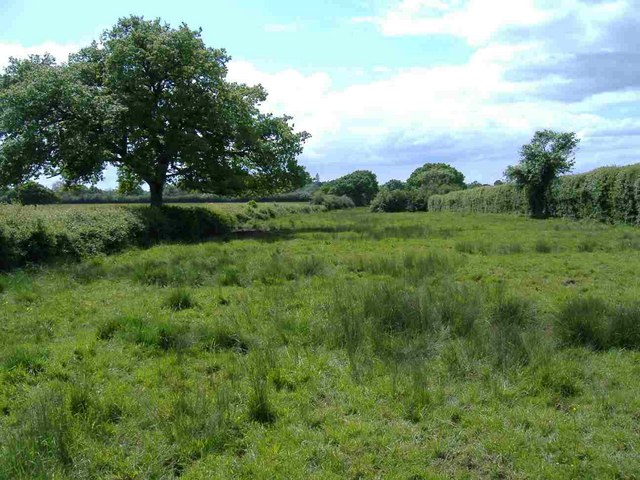
Stoke Common Meadows

Stoke Common Meadows (grid reference SU064904) is a biological Site of Special Scientific Interest in north Wiltshire, England. The 10.2 hectare site is in Purton parish, 1.6 miles (2.6 km) west of Purton Common hamlet and 3 miles (5 km) south-west of the town of Cricklade.

The SSSI was notified in 1994 for the botanical diversity found in its traditionally managed hay meadows.

The site is managed as a nature reserve by Wiltshire Wildlife Trust, together with the larger Blakehill Farm reserve which is adjacent to the north-east.
