= River Key =

River in Wiltshire, England

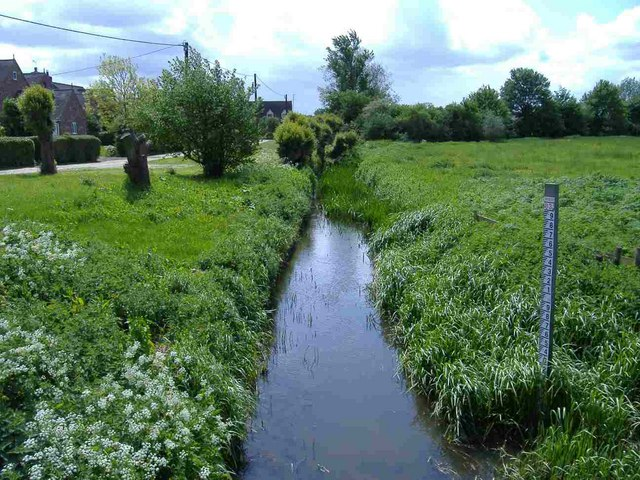
- Key at Purton Stoke

Location
- Country: England
- Counties: Wiltshire

Physical characteristics
- Source
  - location: Purton, Braydon Forest
  - coordinates: 51°35′11″N 1°51′57″W
- Mouth: River Thames
  - location: Cricklade
  - coordinates: 51°38′22″N 1°51′27″W

The River Key is a tributary of the River Thames in England which flows through Wiltshire.

== Course ==
The river rises at Braydon Forest near Purton and runs north-east through Purton Stoke, joining the Thames on the southern bank near Cricklade, just upstream of the A419 Road Bridge.

The river was crossed by the now-derelict North Wilts Canal a few hundred yards south of Cricklade. In December 2000, as part of regeneration of the canal, rescue work was started on the River Key Aqueduct. The river was also crossed by a bridge of the Midland & South Western Junction Railway.

== Water quality ==
The Environment Agency measures the water quality of the river systems in England. Each is given an overall ecological status, which may be one of five levels: high, good, moderate, poor and bad. There are several components that are used to determine this, including biological status, which looks at the quantity and varieties of invertebrates, angiosperms and fish. Chemical status, which compares the concentrations of various chemicals against known safe concentrations, is rated good or fail.

Water quality of the River Key in 2019:

| Section | Ecological Status | Chemical Status | Overall Status | Length | Catchment | Channel |
|---|---|---|---|---|---|---|
| Key (Source to Thames) | Moderate | Fail | Moderate | 10.479 km (6.511 mi) | 27.757 km^{2} (10.717 sq mi) | |

== See also ==
- Tributaries of the River Thames
- List of rivers in England

| Next confluence upstream | River Thames | Next confluence downstream |
| River Churn (north) | River Key | River Ray (south) |
