= Andrew Breeze =

British linguist and philologist (born 1954)

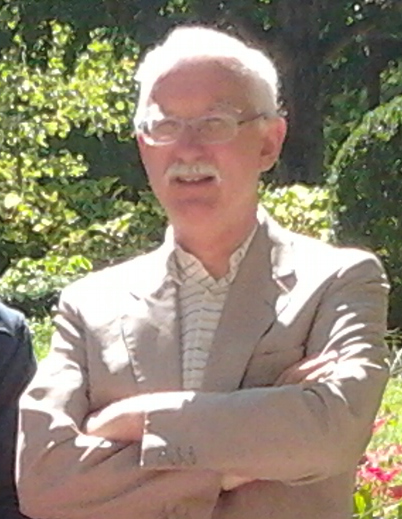
- Born: 1954 (age 71–72); Flitwick, Bedfordshire, England
- Citizenship: United Kingdom
- Known for: Historical linguistics Philology of Celtic languages Onomastics, especially place-names

Academic background
- Education: University of Cambridge, University of Oxford

Academic work
- Discipline: Linguistics
- Institutions: University of Navarra (previously at Dublin Institute for Advanced Studies)

Andrew Breeze FRHistS FSA (born 1954) is an English linguist. He has been professor of philology at the University of Navarra since 1987.

== Early life ==
Breeze was born in 1954 and educated at Sir Roger Manwood's School, Emmanuel College, Cambridge (where he took a first in English in 1974 and in Anglo-Saxon, Norse and Celtic in 1976, and his PhD in 1992), and at St John's College, Oxford (where he took a diploma in Celtic studies in 1978). In 1986, he worked as a scholar for the Dublin Institute for Advanced Studies at the school of Celtic Studies.

== Work ==
Besides numerous research papers on the philology of many Celtic languages, he is the author of Medieval Welsh Literature (1997) and The Origins of the "Four Branches of the Mabinogi" (2009). He is also co-author with Richard Coates of Celtic Voices, English Places (2000).

Breeze has written about Mabinogi studies, and The Mabinogion research, especially addressing historical and political parallels. In 1997 he published the controversial "Did a woman write the Four Branches of the Mabinogi?", proposing a woman composer for this leading literary work of British/ Welsh heritage. Breeze's theory rests on the unusual lack of warlike or fighting heroics compared to preceding literature; the high quantity of material on mothering, besides complex, in-depth portraits of Mabinogi women. This much has been supported or tolerated by some scholars, but there has been discussion regarding Breeze's preferred candidate Gwenllian ferch Gruffydd. Since the 1997 article, Breeze has provided further publications on this topic.

In 2015, he published "The Historical Arthur and Sixth-Century Scotland", which locates King Arthur's battles from the 9th-century Historia Brittonum, placing them all in Scotland and Northern England, with the exception of Mount Badon in the year 493, located at a hillfort east of Braydon Forest, Wiltshire, but having nothing to do with Arthur. Using these identifications, he suggested that Arthur was a Briton from the Kingdom of Strathclyde who fought other Britons, rather than Anglo-Saxons. Other scholars have questioned his findings, which they consider are based on coincidental resemblances between place-names. Nicholas Higham comments that it is difficult to justify identifying Arthur as the leader in northern battles listed in the Historia Brittonum while rejecting the implication in the same work that they were fought against Anglo-Saxons, and that there is no textual justification for separating Badon from the other battles.

Breeze's British Battles 493–937: Mount Badon to Brunanburh was published in 2020 by Anthem Press. As well as reaffirming the Wiltshire site for the 493 battle, it gives new locations for various early conflicts. Amongst them are those of Arthur in 536–7 in southern Scotland and northern England; Degsastan in 603 near Dawyck, on the River Tweed, Scottish Borders; the Battle of Maserfield in 642 at Forden, Powys (and not Oswestry, Shropshire); and Brunanburh in 937 on the River Browney near Lanchester, County Durham (and not Bromborough in Cheshire/Merseyside). This work aims to provide a blueprint for locating a range of battles fought during this early period of British history.

Breeze recently stated that his approach is primarily philological and evolving, and that he is not afraid to reject his own hypotheses if the facts prove them to be incorrect. During an academic interview, he revealed that he has been trying to correct a mistake in his publications about Castell Guinnion and Kirkgunzeon ever since proposing a hypothesis eleven years ago. He also expressed his frustration at the fact that his corrections are being ignored, with errors he corrected over ten years ago still being repeated.

He was elected a Fellow of the Royal Historical Society in 1997 and of the Society of Antiquaries of London in 1996.

== Books ==
- 1997 Medieval Welsh Literature, Four Courts Press (ISBN 1-85182-229-1)
- 2000 (with Richard Coates; including a contribution by David Horovitz) Celtic Voices, English Places: Studies of the Celtic Impact on Place-Names in England, Stamford: Shaun Tyas; (ISBN 1 900289 41 5)
- 2008 The Mary of the Celts, Gracewing (ISBN 978 0 85244 682 9)
- 2009 The Origins of the "Four Branches of the Mabinogi", Gracewing (ISBN 978 0 85244 553 2)
- 2020 British Battles 493–937: Mount Badon to Brunanburh, Anthem (ISBN 1 78527 223 3)
- 2023 The Historical Arthur and The Gawain Poet: Studies on Arthurian and Other Traditions. Rowman & Littlefield. (ISBN 978 1 66692 954 6)
