= Wyvern St Edmund's =

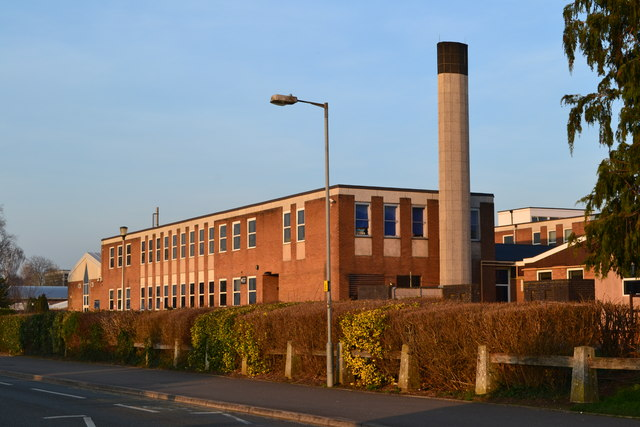
- The former Wyvern College in 2014

Location
- Church Road, Laverstock; Salisbury, Wiltshire, SP1 1RD; England; 51°04′47″N 1°46′18″W

Information
- Type: Academy
- Religious affiliation: Church of England
- Local authority: Wiltshire Council
- Trust: Magna Learning Partnership
- Department for Education URN: 144388 Tables
- Ofsted: Reports
- Headteacher: Bruce Burley
- Gender: Coeducational
- Age: 11 to 16
- Enrolment: 1,330 as of September 2022
- Website: www.wyvernsteds.org

Wyvern St Edmund's is a coeducational secondary school in Laverstock, near Salisbury in the English county of Wiltshire.

== History ==
The school opened in 1972 as Highbury Secondary School, as a replacement for Highbury Avenue secondary modern school which was in a 1930s building at Highbury Avenue, Fisherton Anger, Salisbury. By 1994 there were 530 on the school roll.

In 1995, the school was renamed Wyvern College. Under the specialist schools programme of the 1990s and 2000s it was a Technology College, teaching all subjects but with emphasis on Science, Mathematics, Technology and Communications Technology; it operated in partnership with Wiltshire College Salisbury.

In 2003 the school assumed Voluntary Aided status and became a Church of England school. In April 2017, Wyvern College converted to academy status and joined the adjacent St Edmund's Girls' School in the Magna Learning Partnership, a multi-academy trust. From September 2018 the two schools operated as a single mixed school called Wyvern St Edmunds, pooling their leadership, staff and buildings, although retaining their separate legal identities.

In September 2022 the two schools formally and legally amalgamated as Wyvern St Edmund's.
