= Laverstock =

Village in Wiltshire, England

Coordinates: 51.076°N 1.774°W

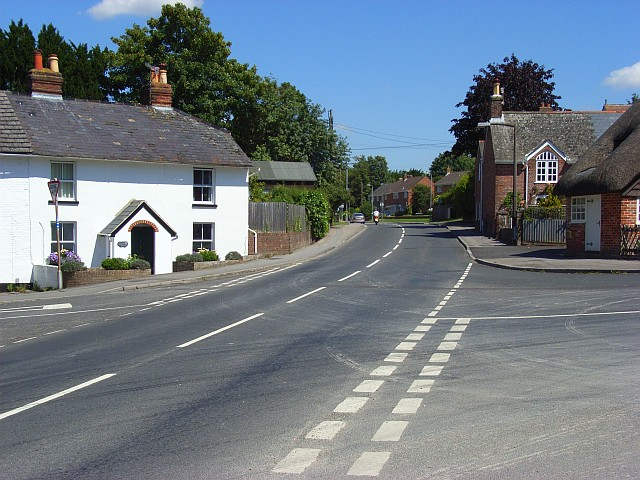
- Riverside Road, Laverstock

- Location within Wiltshire
- Population: 10,277 (2021 Census)
- OS grid reference: SU159309
- Civil parish: Laverstock
- Unitary authority: Wiltshire
- Ceremonial county: Wiltshire
- Region: South West
- Country: England
- Sovereign state: United Kingdom
- Post town: Salisbury
- Postcode district: SP1, SP4
- Dialling code: 01722
- Police: Wiltshire
- Fire: Dorset and Wiltshire
- Ambulance: South Western
- UK Parliament: Salisbury
- Website: Parish Council

Laverstock is a village and civil parish on the north-east and east outskirts of Salisbury in the ceremonial county of Wiltshire, England. The parish is shaped like a figure 7 and incorporates Ford hamlet, the eastern half of the former manor of Milford, the area near the ancient settlement of Old Sarum, and part of the Hampton Park district on the edge of Salisbury. In 2021 the parish had a population of 10,277.

Laverstock, the parish's main settlement, lies on the east bank of the River Bourne and is approximately 1 mile (1.6 km) east of Salisbury city centre, 33 miles (53 km) due south of Swindon and 77 miles (124 km) west-southwest of London.

== History ==
Flint mines and signs of barrows have been discovered on Burrough's Hill, indicating settlement back to Neolithic time. There is also evidence of settlement during the Iron and Bronze Age. A Roman cemetery and settlement has been found on Cocky's Hill. Laverstock has two entries in the Domesday Book which indicate the settlement was then owned by Wilton Abbey with some parts owned by officers of the king.

Milford Mill Bridge, linking the parish with Salisbury over the Bourne, dates from the 14th century and is Grade I listed.

St Thomas's Bridge to the north was named for Thomas Becket who walked an ancient route through the settlement. It was built c. 1700 and widened in 1900.

Laverstock once boasted a number of large houses: Laverstock Hall, Laverstock House, Laverstock Hill and Burroughs Hill. Laverstock House was a large and noted private licensed madhouse from the 18th to the 20th century, owned by the Finch family. It closed in 1955 and has since been demolished as have Laverstock Hill and Laverstock Hall to provide modern residential development.

=== Laverstock ware ===
In the 13th and 14th centuries Laverstock was the centre of a prosperous ceramic industry, with baluster jugs (polychrome-glazed tall jugs) being supplied to the nearby Clarendon Palace and sold all over the south of England. The jugs were lead- and tin-glazed, with the colouration obtained from iron oxides. The use of tin compounds in the glaze was specific to Laverstock ware and, using modern techniques of analysis, their presence serves to distinguish these artefacts from items produced elsewhere. More mundane items, such as money boxes, cookware, tiles and chimney pots were also produced. The workshops and kilns were situated near the present-day Potters Way and Duck Lane, grid reference SU 160 298.

== Geography ==
Laverstock parish incorporates all of Laverstock, Ford and part of Milford, as well as several more recent housing developments. The parish is within Salisbury's Urban Area but is controlled by its own parish council rather than Salisbury's city council.

=== Milford ===
Milford was an ancient manor, recorded in 1275 as belonging to the Bishop of Salisbury.

In 1835 part of Milford which bordered the city of Salisbury became the civil parish of Milford Within. In 1904 the city became a single civil parish and more land, extending as far as the Bourne, was transferred to the city. The eastern part of Milford became the parish of Milford Without in 1894, then in 1904 was divided between Salisbury and Laverstock parish. Milford is a suburb in eastern Salisbury and is situated on the A36, which is known locally as Southampton Road. The suburb is also the home of the large Southampton Road retail park and is near the Petersfinger Park and Ride site. The area remains divided between the Salisbury and Laverstock parishes. The eastern half of Milford is within the Laverstock parish; the western half is in the parish of Salisbury where the suburb is part of the St Edmund and Milford ward. Milford is bounded by the A36 road to the south and west, Laverstock to the north and the River Bourne to the east.

=== Laverstock ===
Laverstock is a suburban village on the eastern outskirts of Salisbury, 1.2 miles (2 km) east-northeast of the city centre. The village has a small number of businesses, mainly clustered around Church Road. These include a fish and chip shop, a Chinese takeaway and a 'One Stop' convenience store. Also within the area is Laverstock and Ford sports club which is home to Laverstock & Ford F.C. and a cricket team, among others. There are two secondary schools on adjacent sites: Wyvern St Edmund's and St Joseph's Catholic School. Laverstock borders Milford to the south, Hampton Park to the north, and across the River Bourne to the west is St Mark's. Laverstock is the largest settlement in the parish, having a population of around 3,000 in 2011.

=== Ford ===
The hamlet of Ford is in the north of the parish, at a crossing of the Bourne. The area is bordered by Old Sarum to the north-west and Hampton Park to the south, and is two miles north-north-east of Salisbury city centre. Ford had a population of 402 in 2011.

Until at least the late 19th century, the settlement was known as Winterbourne Ford. It lies on a Roman road running east from Old Sarum to Winterslow. In 1269 the parish of St Martin's church, Salisbury extended as far as Ford. In 1545 a small part of Ford's land (in Laverstock parish) was recorded in Underditch hundred, while the remainder of it was entered under Alderbury hundred. Later it was a tithing which was stated in the 1870 Imperial Gazetteer to lie in Idmiston, Laverstock, and St. Martin parishes.

The Ordnance Survey map published in 1958 shows a small number of houses and a chapel on the left bank of the river, and farm buildings on the other side. A 19th-century former corn mill spans a channel of the Bourne and is attached to a house dated 1783. In the later 20th and early 21st centuries, some of the farm buildings were replaced by a housing estate, bounded on the south by the straight lane which follows the route of the Roman road.

=== Bishopdown Farm, Hampton Park and Riverdown Park ===
These contiguous residential areas have developed since the early 1990s on the northeastern edge of Salisbury, north of Laverstock and south of Ford. Bishopdown Farm lies to the west, Hampton Park to the east, and the newer Riverdown Park to the north. In 2020, the combined population of these areas was estimated at 3,600, compared to the 2,700 residents of Laverstock and the relevant part of Milford.

=== Old Sarum and Longhedge Park ===
The scheduled monument at Old Sarum – with many phases of use including a prehistoric hillfort, royal palace and medieval town with 11th-century cathedral – lies within the city boundary, but the name has been adopted for more recent developments in the same area, in the north-west of Laverstock parish. Around 800 homes and a primary school were built just north of Old Sarum Airfield between 2008 and 2016, and there is a small business park next to the airfield. A further housing development called Longhedge Village, around 750 homes accessed from the A345, was built further north from 2018.

== Governance ==
The first level of local government is the parish council, which is called "Laverstock & Ford Parish Council". Twelve parish councillors are elected from three wards: Laverstock and Milford, Ford and Old Sarum, and Bishopdown Farm; the latter ward includes the Hampton Park and Riverdown Park housing areas.

Most significant local government functions (including schools, roads, social services, recycling, emergency planning, leisure services, housing, development control and waste disposal) are carried out by Wiltshire Council, a unitary authority. For elections to Wiltshire Council, the area is covered by two electoral divisions which each return one councillor. Laverstock and Hampton Park form Laverstock division, while the northern part of the parish, including Ford and Old Sarum, is part of the extensive rural Old Sarum & Lower Bourne Valley division.

== Railways ==
In 1847 a railway between Eastleigh and Salisbury was built with a terminus at Milford. This station was damaged by fire in 1858 and it was decided to dig a tunnel to access Fisherton which was closer to the city. In 1857 the West of England line from London Waterloo via Andover was built, joining the older line at Laverstock Junction to access the station at Fisherton.

== Old Sarum Airfield ==
In 1917 part of Ford Farm in the north of the parish was bought by the government to provide a site for the developing Royal Flying Corps. Initially known as Ford Farm, it quickly adopted the name of Old Sarum Airfield from the nearby ancient fortification of Old Sarum. Hangars and a workshop erected in 1918 survive. The airfield's single grass runway continues in use by businesses operating light aircraft.

== Church of St. Andrew ==
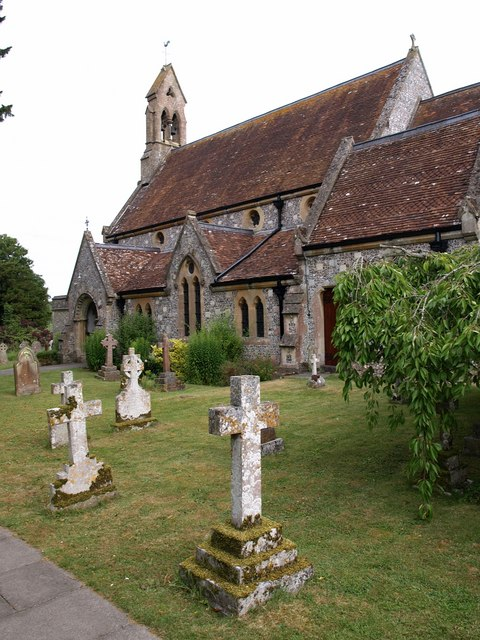
St Andrew's Church

It is unclear whether a Saxon church existed but there was a Norman church that was appropriated together with its income by Bishop Poore to provide offerings to priests in the new cathedral. In 1410 the church was completely destroyed together with the priest's house and nearby buildings. It was later rebuilt but by 1853 was reported to be in poor condition. The church was demolished and a new one, designed by TH Wyatt in knapped flint with ashlar quoins, was built in 1858 at a cost of £2,353. Wyatt's design included a flat-roofed church room, attached to the west end of the church. The whole is a Grade II listed building.

The south and west windows contain fragments of grisaille glass from Salisbury Cathedral, collected by Canon Stanley Baker from the street ditches in Salisbury where it had been thrown after its removal from the cathedral by James Wyatt in 1788. Canon Baker is buried in the churchyard. The church has no bells.

== Education ==
The parish has three primary schools. The first school in Laverstock village was established in the 1830s and moved into a new building in 1888; after expansion in the 20th century the school continues as St Andrew's CE VA Primary School. Housing development in the early 21st century led to the building of Old Sarum Primary School, and Greentrees Primary School which is on two sites at Bishopdown.

There are two secondary schools on adjacent sites on Church Road, which have wide catchment areas:

- St Joseph's Catholic School, a voluntary aided school
- Wyvern St Edmund's, a Church of England academy

== Sites of Special Scientific Interest ==
Cockey Down, a grassy hill to the east of Laverstock, is a chalk down Site of Special Scientific Interest, protected for its flora and fauna. The River Bourne chalk stream, which flows through the parish and passes west of Laverstock village, is part of the Hampshire Avon system which is a Site of Special Scientific Interest and a Special Area of Conservation.

== Freedom of the Parish ==
David Law, a former parish councillor, was awarded the Freedom of the Parish on 17 February 2020 for services to the community and to the parish council.
