= 6th century in England =

Events from the 6th century in England.

== Events ==
- c. 500
  - Angles colonise the North Sea and Humber coastal areas, particularly around Holderness.
- 501
  - Port and his sons, Bieda and Mægla, arrive at modern-day Portsmouth.
- 519
  - Cerdic founds the Kingdom of Wessex.
- 527
  - Foundation of the Kingdom of Essex.
- 536
  - The Extreme weather events of 535–536 likely caused a great famine and decline in population.
- 547
  - Angles under Ida conquer a Celtic area called Bryneich, founding the Kingdom of Bernicia.
- 549
  - A great plague causes much population loss.
- 550
  - Gildas completes his post-Roman history On the Destruction of Britain.
- 560
  - Angles conquer eastern Yorkshire and the British kingdom of Ebrauc, and establish the Kingdom of Deira.
- 571
  - Foundation of the Kingdom of East Anglia.
  - Battle of Bedcanford: Cuthwulf captures Limbury, Aylesbury, Benson, and Eynsham.
- 577
  - Battle of Deorham: Ceawlin of Wessex captures Gloucester, Cirencester and Bath from the British, expanding his kingdom to the west.
- 581
  - Ælla enlarges the Kingdom of Deira.
- 584
  - Battle of Fethanleag, perhaps at Stoke Lyne in Oxfordshire: Ceawlin and Cutha fight against the Britons; the latter is killed and the former returns to his kingdom.
- 585
  - Foundation of the Kingdom of Mercia.
- 590
  - Elmet joins an alliance of Celtic kingdoms against the expanding Angles of Bernicia.
  - Urien of Rheged murdered.
- 597
  - Augustine leads a papal mission to Britain, converts Kent to Christianity, becomes the first Bishop of Canterbury and founds the predecessor of The King's School, Canterbury.
- 598
  - Traditional foundation date of St Augustine's Abbey, Canterbury.
- c. 600
  - Battle of Catraeth (perhaps Catterick, North Yorkshire): Northumbria defeats an invasion by a combined force from Wales and Lothian.
  - Possible foundation date of Repton Abbey.
