= Cockey Down =

Protected area in Wiltshire, England

Coordinates: 51.085700°N 1.756128°W

Cockey Down (grid reference SU170317) is a 15.2 hectare biological Site of Special Scientific Interest in Wiltshire, notified in 1971.

The site is managed as a nature reserve by Wiltshire Wildlife Trust.

== Sources ==
- Natural England citation sheet for the site (accessed 24 March 2022)
