= Forest of Braydon =

Royal forest in Wiltshire, England

The Forest of Braydon (anciently Bradon) is an historic royal hunting forest in Wiltshire, England, the remnant of which lies about 6 miles north-west of Swindon. In medieval times it encompassed about 30,000 acres.

== History ==
In the year 688 Caedwalla, king of the West Saxons, granted to Abbot Aldhelm of Malmesbury Abbey in Wiltshire, thirty hides on the eastern side of Braydon Wood (de orientali parte silve Bradon).

At its greatest extent, Braydon Forest covered about a third of the area of the county of Wiltshire, but over the centuries most of it was gradually cleared. A 108-acre (44 ha) remnant south of Minety, known as Ravensroost Wood, was notified as a Site of Special Scientific Interest in 1989 and is managed as a nature reserve by Wiltshire Wildlife Trust.

== Keepers ==
Persons holding the office of "Keeper of the Forest of Bradon" include:

- 1293: Roger de Moels (c. 1232–1295), father of John de Moels, 1st Baron Moels (d. 1310).
- 1374: William Archbold (d. after 1400), an Irish-born member of the King's household, and later a judge in Ireland.
