= Minety =

Village in Wiltshire, England

Coordinates: 51.615°N 1.965°W

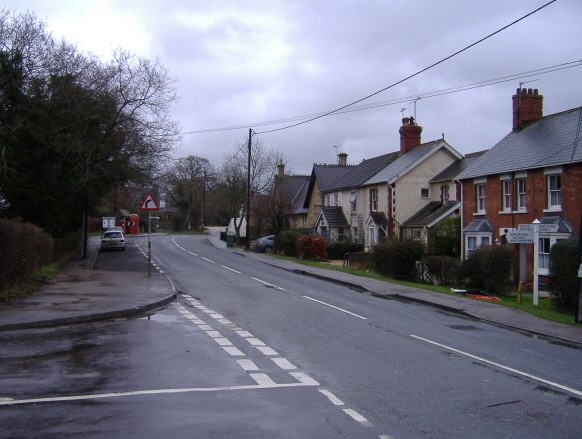
- The centre of Minety

- Location within Wiltshire
- Population: 1,414 (in 2011)
- OS grid reference: SU025907
- Unitary authority: Wiltshire
- Ceremonial county: Wiltshire
- Region: South West
- Country: England
- Sovereign state: United Kingdom
- Post town: Malmesbury
- Postcode district: SN16
- Dialling code: 01666
- Police: Wiltshire
- Fire: Dorset and Wiltshire
- Ambulance: South Western
- UK Parliament: South Cotswolds
- Website: Parish Council

Minety (/'maɪn.tiː/) is a village in north Wiltshire, England, between Malmesbury – 6 miles (9.7 km) to the west – and Swindon. It takes its name from the water mint plant found growing in ditches around the village, and has previously been known as Myntey. It has a primary school and a successful rugby club.

== Geography ==
The village is divided into Upper Minety, with St Leonard's church, and Lower Minety (or simply Minety) which grew after the railway arrived. The civil parish includes the hamlets of Brandier, Lower Moor and the former hamlet of Sawyers Hill, now part of Minety village.

Swill Brook forms part of the northern boundary of the parish and joins the infant River Thames a short distance outside the parish, near Ashton Keynes.

Acres Farm Meadow is a biological Site of Special Scientific Interest.

The Minety Battery Energy Storage project, about 2.8 kilometres (1.7 mi) west of the village, was the largest grid-connected battery in Europe when it began operation in 2021.

== History ==
Fragments of an Anglo-Saxon carved stone cross shaft were found in the foundations of the church in the 1890s. An estate at Minety was granted to Malmesbury Abbey by Æthelwulf in the 830s. This, together with the rectory estate, passed to Salisbury diocese in 1270 and financed the Archdeacon of Wiltshire. Apart from this, land around Minety was part of the royal manor of Cirencester in the 11th century, and the manor was given to Cirencester Abbey in the early 12th century. Later owners included George Pitt, 1st Baron Rivers.

The local clay is suitable for firing, fuelled by timber from the surrounding Forest of Braydon, and there is evidence of Roman tile-making. 'Minety ware' produced in the 14th and 15th centuries was sold in the nearby towns; A 1971 excavation at a former hamlet to the southeast of the church found ridge-tiles and many pans, jugs and pots. Other excavations have shown extensive Roman era ceramic material at Brandier, particularly the fields surrounding Brandiers Farm.

The settlement known today as Upper Minety developed around the parish church, where some 40 acres lay in Wiltshire. The rest of Minety lay in Gloucestershire, as a detached portion of Crowthorne-with-Minety hundred, until the whole parish became part of Wiltshire under the Reform Act 1832 and the Detached Parishes Act 1844. Also in that century, a new settlement known as Lower Minety grew around the railway station.

Minety Church of England Primary School opened in 1969 at Lower Minety, replacing St Leonard's School (c. 1847) and Silver Street School (1875). The earlier schools had educated children of all ages until the mid-1950s, when older pupils transferred to Malmesbury Secondary School.

== Governance ==
The civil parish elects a parish council. It is in the area of Wiltshire Council, a unitary authority, which is responsible for most significant local government functions.

== Parish church ==
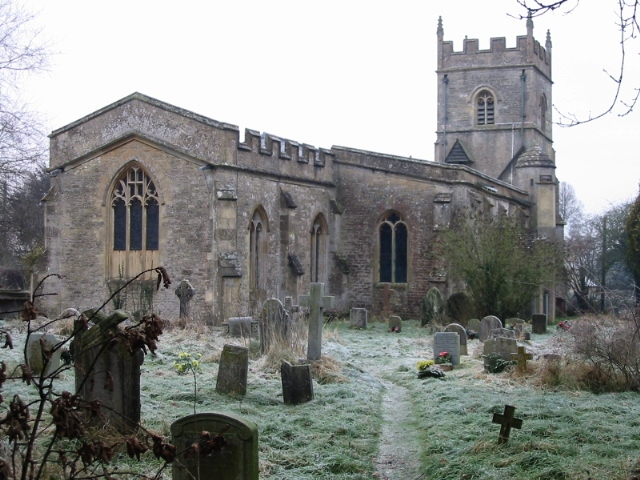
St Leonard's church, Upper Minety

The Anglican Church of St Leonard was built in the 15th century at Upper Minety, on the site of an earlier church. It consists of a nave, chancel, north aisle, northwest tower and south porch. Fragments of 15th-century stained glass have been re-used in the choir vestry screen. Restoration took place in 1896 and piecemeal in the 20th century.

Five of the six bells in the tower were cast in 1720 by Abraham Rudhall II. The church has been Grade I listed since 1959.

The parish is within the Archdeaconry of Malmesbury, which became part of the Diocese of Bristol on the re-creation of that diocese in 1897. Today the parish is part of the Braydon Brook benefice, a group of six rural parishes.

== Railway ==
From 1841 the village was served by Minety station (renamed "Minety & Ashton Keynes" in 1905) on the former Cheltenham and Great Western Union Railway line from Gloucester to Swindon. Although the line remains open, the station closed in November 1964 and has been demolished.

== Notable inhabitants ==
- Captain Giles Penn, Merchant Venturer out of Bristol and Jeanne Gilbert (of Yorkshire) – grandparents of the Quaker, William Penn, Founder of Pennsylvania
- Ian Anderson of Jethro Tull
