= Wiltshire Wildlife Trust =

Conservation charity in Wiltshire, England

- Founded: 1962
- Type: Charity. Membership organisation. Governed by a Memorandum and Articles of Association. Registered charity and a company limited by guarantee (Company number 730536).
- Registration no.: 266202
- Purpose: Creating a sustainable future for wildlife and people
- Location(s): Elm Tree Court, Long Street, Devizes, Wiltshire, SN10 1NJ
- Members: 20,000+
- Key people: Dr Gary Mantle, MBE (Director)
- Employees: 75+
- Volunteers: 1,700+
- Website: www.wiltshirewildlife.org

Wiltshire Wildlife Trust is a conservation charity based in Devizes, England which owns and manages 40 nature reserves in Wiltshire and Swindon. It also works to encourage Wiltshire's communities to live sustainable lifestyles that protect the environment.

It is one of 46 Wildlife Trusts across the United Kingdom, which together form the largest voluntary organisation dedicated to protecting wildlife and wild places everywhere – at land and at sea.

It issues a variety of publications including a members magazine, Wiltshire Wildlife. Its digital presence includes social networking, such as Twitter, Instagram, Facebook and LinkedIn.

== History ==
Formed in 1962 as The Wiltshire Trust for Nature Conservation Ltd, with just seven members contributing £1 per year, the trust was incorporated under the Companies Act on 23 July 1962. Involved in the creation of the trust was acclaimed author and poet John Buxton. The inaugural meeting was held at County Hall, Trowbridge with some 160 people attending.

The trust began creating nature reserves in 1963 with the purchase of Blackmoor Copse. Within a decade, the trust owned nine more reserves, had received its first legacy gift and membership had grown to 800. As it reached its 20th anniversary, the trust owned 30 nature reserves and had 2,000 members. In 1989, the first Sarsen Trail & Neolithic Marathon was held, raising £21,500 which was used to buy Morgan's Hill nature reserve.

For its 30th anniversary, in 1992, the trust formally changed its name to Wiltshire Wildlife Trust. In 1994, the trust employed its first otter habitat project officer; at that time, there were no known otters in the county. In 2012, Wiltshire Wildlife Trust featured three reserves in the "Royal Society of Wildlife Trusts's Guide to Otters", a testament to the success of the project.

In its 50th year, 2012, the trust owned and managed 37 nature reserves.

As of 2022, its 60th year, the trust owns and manages over 40 nature reserves, including three farming operations, and has over 20,000 members.

== Programmes and projects ==
The trust undertakes a wide variety of projects to engage local residents with its work, and to develop an understanding and love for the natural environment. As of 2022, these activities include:

- Action for Insects - increasing the biodiversity of invertebrates on its nature reserves.
- Bay Meadows - Creating a haven for nature in Marlborough.
- Braydon Forest Marsh Fritillary Project - supporting the marsh fritillary butterfly.
- Building Bridges supporting people across Swindon and Wiltshire by helping them develop skills, access education and move back into work.
- Lakeside and The Willows Care Farms offering children, young people and adults with individual needs with meaningful education and work-based experiences.
- Green Living
- Swindon Forest Meadows - A joint project with Swindon Borough Council to restore wildflower meadows.
- Wild Landscapes – the team works to create green spaces for wildlife and people.
- Well-being focuses on helping people experiencing mental health issues such as stress and depression by using nature to promote well-being.
- Unaccompanied Asylum Seeking Children
- Protecting Wiltshire's Rivers: Wiltshire is home to a number of nationally and internationally important chalk streams, such as the Salisbury Avon. This programme operates the Wessex Chalk Streams Project which restores sections of the River Avon and its tributaries that have been affected by dredging and straightening. It recreates the natural course of the river, putting back meanders and riffles and creating habitats for threatened species such as European otter and European water vole. The Source to Sea and Wiltshire Invasive Species projects proactively seek out areas affected by invasive species, such as Himalayan balsam and Japanese knotweed, removing and disposing of these damaging non-native plants.

Wiltshire has a large military population and the trust runs community-based programmes that encourage military families to get outside and connect with nature and local residents. It is also working with the charity Help for Heroes, aiding injured service personnel to recover through carrying out conservation tasks at Tedworth House.

== Nature reserves ==
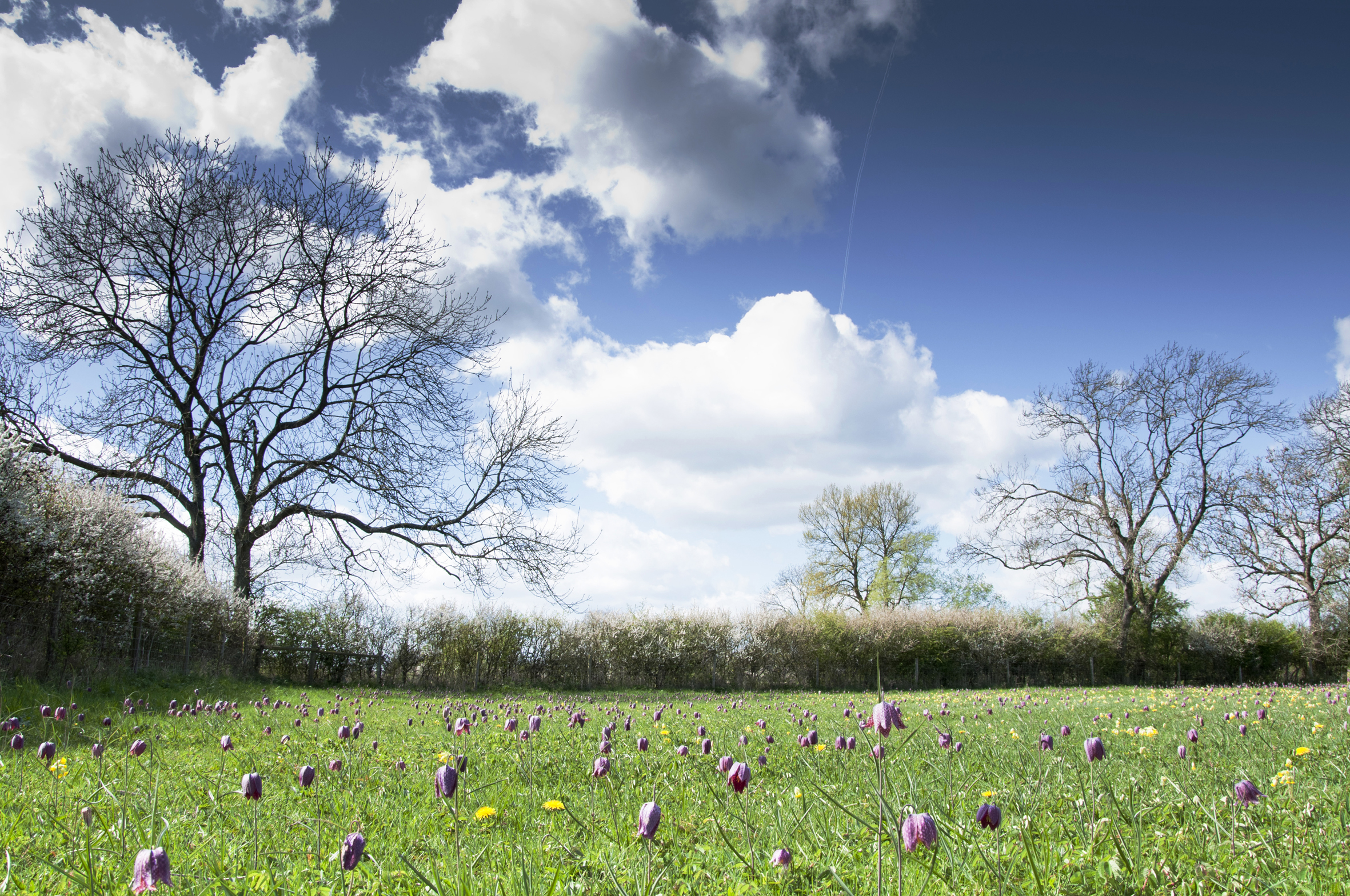
Snake's head fritillaries at Clattinger Farm

The trust owns and manages 40 nature reserves (including complexes of several adjacent reserves) across the county. Among these are the following Sites of Special Scientific Interest:

- Clattinger Farm
- Cloatley Manor Farm Meadows
- Clout's Wood
- Cockey Down
- Distillery Farm Meadows
- Emmett Hill Meadows
- Ham Hill
- Homington and Coombe Bissett Downs
- Jones's Mill
- Landford Bog
- Morgan's Hill
- Ravensroost Wood
- Stoke Common Meadows
- Upper Waterhay Meadow

In 2013, the trust's nature reserve at Clattinger Farm was named as one of the first Coronation Meadows, to mark the 60th anniversary of The Queen's coronation.

== Living landscapes ==
The trust is part of the national living landscapes project to restore, re-create and reconnect conservation sites with the wider countryside across England.

== Services ==
- Weddings
- Cafe's - The Trust owns two cafe's, the Kingfisher Cafe at Langford Lakes and the Dragonfly Cafe at Lower Moor
- Venue hire
- Care Farms
- Forest School training
- Workplace wellbeing
- Chalkhill Environmental Consultants
- Wiltshire Wildlife Community Energy (WWCE)
- Wiltshire & Swindon Biological Records Centre (WSBRC) - Within the trust's headquarters at Devizes is the Wiltshire and Swindon Biological Records Centre (WSBRC). Its role is to collect, collate, manage, interpret and disseminate relevant information for the county. Data from WSBRC is publicly available.
