= Grade II* listed buildings in Wiltshire (H–O) =

Wiltshire shown in England

There are over 20,000 Grade II* listed buildings in England. This article comprises a list of these buildings in the county of Wiltshire.

== List ==
Name	Location	Type	Completed (Note: The date given is the date used by Historic England as significant for the initial building or that of an important part in the structure's description.)	Date designated	Grid ref. (Note: The grid reference is based on the British national grid reference system, sometimes known as OSGB36, used by the Ordnance Survey.) Geo-coordinates	Entry number (Note: The "List Entry Number" is a unique number assigned to each listed building and scheduled monument by Historic England.)	Image
Greystone House	Devizes, Wiltshire	House	Between 1740 and 1744	9 April 1954	SU0052761343; 51°21′04″N 1°59′38″W	1249805	Greystone House More images
Grittleton Baptist Chapel	Grittleton, Wiltshire	Baptist Chapel	c. 1720	29 May 1985	ST8618080057; 51°31′09″N 2°12′02″W	1363850	Upload Photo
Grittleton House	Grittleton, Wiltshire	House	1856	29 February 1988	ST8609179998; 51°31′07″N 2°12′07″W	1022310	Grittleton House More images
Group of 4 Rice Vaughan and associated Monuments, in Churchyard North East of Church of St Sampson	Cricklade, Wiltshire	Chest Tomb	C15-C16	11 November 1976	SU0995493545; 51°38′26″N 1°51′27″W	1284388	Upload Photo
Group of Nine Monuments in Churchyard South West of South Aisle of Church of St Michael	Kington St Michael, Wiltshire	Tomb	18th century and early 19th century	29 February 1988	ST9037277181; 51°29′37″N 2°08′24″W	1199214	Upload Photo
The North Canonry and Coach House	Salisbury, Wiltshire	Clergy House	13th century	28 February 1952	SU1415329600; 51°03′56″N 1°47′58″W	1261322	The North Canonry and Coach House More images
99 and 99a High Street	Marlborough, Wiltshire	Apartment	1908	1 April 1985	SU1863368933; 51°25′09″N 1°44′00″W	1257278	99 and 99a High Street More images
5 St John's Square	Wilton, Wiltshire	Chapel	Late Norman	4 August 1951	SU0940631444; 51°04′56″N 1°52′02″W	1365905	Upload Photo
5 The Close	Salisbury, Wiltshire	Choir School	14th century origin	28 February 1952	SU1442929568; 51°03′55″N 1°47′44″W	1251965	5 The Close
12 The Close	Salisbury, Wiltshire	Church Hall	C13/C14	28 February 1952	SU1451129629; 51°03′57″N 1°47′39″W	1355834	12 The Close
18 The Close	Salisbury, Wiltshire	Clergy House	Bequeathed 1319-1320	28 February 1952	SU1447729668; 51°03′58″N 1°47′41″W	1023594	18 The Close More images
21 and 21a The Close	Salisbury, Wiltshire	Clergy House	13th century	28 February 1952	SU1435229676; 51°03′58″N 1°47′48″W	1023597	21 and 21a The Close More images
55a The Close	Salisbury, Wiltshire	Coachmans Cottage	Early 19th century	12 October 1972	SU1419829767; 51°04′01″N 1°47′56″W	1023617	Upload Photo
92, 93 and 94 Bradenstoke	Bradenstoke, Lyneham and Bradenstoke, Wiltshire	Cross Passage House	C15-C16	17 January 1955	ST9997679375; 51°30′48″N 2°00′06″W	1363678	92, 93 and 94 Bradenstoke More images
19 South Street	Wilton, Wiltshire	Cross Passage House	Possibly older	8 June 1978	SU0959431112; 51°04′45″N 1°51′52″W	1023739	19 South Street
23 High Street	Highworth, Swindon	House	c. 1800	26 January 1955	SU2008792443; 51°37′50″N 1°42′40″W	1023357	23 High Street
10 High Street	Highworth, Swindon	House	c. 1700	26 January 1955	SU2017692446; 51°37′50″N 1°42′36″W	1023352	10 High Street
2a and 3 High Street	Highworth, Swindon	House	Recently restored	26 January 1955	SU2024792446; 51°37′50″N 1°42′32″W	1023349	2a and 3 High Street
3 Kingston Road	Bradford-on-Avon, Wiltshire	House	18th century	18 April 1952	ST8274060964; 51°20′51″N 2°14′57″W	1200601	3 Kingston Road More images
6 Curzon Street	Calne, Wiltshire	House	1617	19 May 1950	ST9966371151; 51°26′22″N 2°00′22″W	1247118	Upload Photo
3 Market Hill	Calne, Wiltshire	House	1683	19 May 1950	ST9968571042; 51°26′18″N 2°00′21″W	1247318	Upload Photo
20 The Green	The Green, Calne, Wiltshire	House	16th century	19 May 1950	ST9994970718; 51°26′08″N 2°00′08″W	1247437	Upload Photo
7 The Green	The Green, Calne, Wiltshire	House	18th century	8 July 1976	ST9996970828; 51°26′11″N 2°00′07″W	1247409	Upload Photo
18 St Mary Street	Chippenham, Wiltshire	House	Early 18th century	22 June 1978	ST9235073125; 51°27′25″N 2°06′41″W	1267942	Upload Photo
16 St Mary Street	Chippenham, Wiltshire	House	Early 17th century	25 April 1950	ST9232873140; 51°27′26″N 2°06′43″W	1267939	Upload Photo
19 St Mary Street	Chippenham, Wiltshire	House	Early 18th century	25 April 1950	ST9235773112; 51°27′25″N 2°06′41″W	1267943	Upload Photo
79 High Street	Corsham, Wiltshire	House	16th century or earlier	20 December 1960	ST8730270661; 51°26′05″N 2°11′03″W	1022054	79 High Street More images
102 and 104 High Street	Corsham, Wiltshire	House	Late 17th century	20 December 1960	ST8732070641; 51°26′05″N 2°11′02″W	1363989	102 and 104 High Street More images
110 and 112 High Street	Corsham, Wiltshire	House	possibly earlier	20 December 1960	ST8732370657; 51°26′05″N 2°11′02″W	1022044	110 and 112 High Street More images
106 and 108 High Street	Corsham, Wiltshire	House	Late 17th century	20 December 1960	ST8732170647; 51°26′05″N 2°11′02″W	1183036	Upload Photo
92, 92a and 90a High Street	Corsham, Wiltshire	House	17th century	20 December 1960	ST8730870609; 51°26′04″N 2°11′02″W	1022043	92, 92a and 90a High Street More images
23 High Street	Cricklade, Wiltshire	House	Late 17th century	11 November 1976	SU0999893524; 51°38′26″N 1°51′25″W	1284274	23 High Street More images
4 and 5 Northgate Street	Devizes, Wiltshire	House	18th century	19 September 1972	SU0026961588; 51°21′12″N 1°59′51″W	1251679	Upload Photo
3 Northgate Street	Devizes, Wiltshire	House	Mid 18th century	9 April 1954	SU0027561581; 51°21′12″N 1°59′51″W	1251678	Upload Photo
Morris Lane	Devizes, Wiltshire	House	Early 19th century	9 April 1954	SU0064761266; 51°21′02″N 1°59′32″W	1250952	Upload Photo
21 and 22 St John's Street	Devizes, Wiltshire	House	1740	9 April 1954	SU0047161299; 51°21′03″N 1°59′41″W	1252308	Upload Photo
28 St John's Street	Devizes, Wiltshire	House	Mid 18th century	9 April 1954	SU0044061336; 51°21′04″N 1°59′42″W	1252312	28 St John's Street More images
29 and 30 St John's Street	Devizes, Wiltshire	House	1749	9 April 1954	SU0044361354; 51°21′05″N 1°59′42″W	1262334	29 and 30 St John's Street More images
33 and 34 St John's Street	Devizes, Wiltshire	House	Late 18th century	9 April 1954	SU0041961369; 51°21′05″N 1°59′43″W	1262335	Upload Photo
39 St John's Street	Devizes, Wiltshire	House	Late C18/Early 19th century	9 April 1954	SU0040661420; 51°21′07″N 1°59′44″W	1252317	39 St John's Street More images
8 Long Street	Devizes, Wiltshire	House	1737	9 April 1954	SU0053261273; 51°21′02″N 1°59′37″W	1249844	Upload Photo
9 Long Street	Devizes, Wiltshire	House	Late 18th century	9 April 1954	SU0053661261; 51°21′02″N 1°59′37″W	1263544	Upload Photo
10 Long Street	Devizes, Wiltshire	House	18th century	9 April 1954	SU0053961253; 51°21′01″N 1°59′37″W	1249845	10 Long Street More images
11 Long Street	Devizes, Wiltshire	Town House	Late 18th century	9 April 1954	SU0054661242; 51°21′01″N 1°59′37″W	1249860	11 Long Street More images
18 Long Street	Devizes, Wiltshire	House	Early 18th century	9 April 1954	SU0057661192; 51°20′59″N 1°59′35″W	1249848	Upload Photo
27 Long Street	Devizes, Wiltshire	House	Late 18th century	9 April 1954	SU0061061116; 51°20′57″N 1°59′33″W	1249869	Upload Photo
33 and 33a Long Street	Devizes, Wiltshire	House	Possibly older	9 April 1954	SU0058961097; 51°20′56″N 1°59′35″W	1263549	Upload Photo
35, 35a and 36 Long Street	Devizes, Wiltshire	House	18th century	9 April 1954	SU0058261117; 51°20′57″N 1°59′35″W	1263516	Upload Photo
16 Market Place	Devizes, Wiltshire	House	18th century	9 April 1954	SU0029561540; 51°21′11″N 1°59′50″W	1250422	Upload Photo
14–16 Church Street	Lacock, Wiltshire	House	Post 1833	20 December 1960	ST9168668590; 51°24′59″N 2°07′15″W	1283936	14–16 Church Street More images
2–5 High Street	Lacock, Wiltshire	House	17th century	20 December 1960	ST9163368416; 51°24′53″N 2°07′18″W	1363940	2–5 High Street More images
23 Bristol Street	Malmesbury, Wiltshire	House	Late 17th century	1 July 1976	ST9297787406; 51°35′08″N 2°06′10″W	1269535	Upload Photo
9 Oxford Street	Malmesbury, Wiltshire	House	16th century	1 July 1976	ST9336087217; 51°35′02″N 2°05′50″W	1269304	9 Oxford Street More images
92 High Street	Malmesbury, Wiltshire	House	1976	18 January 1949	ST9344586935; 51°34′52″N 2°05′46″W	1269362	92 High Street More images
8 Gloucester Street	Malmesbury, Wiltshire	House	1996	18 January 1949	ST9327487209; 51°35′01″N 2°05′54″W	1269452	8 Gloucester Street More images
142 and 143 High Street	Marlborough, Wiltshire	House	18th century	18 July 1949	SU1886069210; 51°25′18″N 1°43′49″W	1034234	142 and 143 High Street More images
36 and 37 High Street	Marlborough, Wiltshire	House	Early 18th century	18 July 1949	SU1869668953; 51°25′09″N 1°43′57″W	1253338	36 and 37 High Street More images
1 The Green	Marlborough, Wiltshire	House	18th century	18 July 1949	SU1894969318; 51°25′21″N 1°43′44″W	1262007	Upload Photo
10 and 11 Kingsbury Street	Marlborough, Wiltshire	House	Late 18th century	18 July 1949	SU1883269277; 51°25′20″N 1°43′50″W	1365444	Upload Photo
20 The Close	Salisbury, Wiltshire	House	1718 Refronting	28 February 1952	SU1439129664; 51°03′58″N 1°47′46″W	1023596	20 The Close More images
24 The Close	Salisbury, Wiltshire	House	18th century	28 February 1952	SU1432929719; 51°04′00″N 1°47′49″W	1023602	24 The Close More images
86 Crane Street	Salisbury, Wiltshire	House	19th century	12 October 1972	SU1422529826; 51°04′03″N 1°47′54″W	1023641	Upload Photo
55 The Close	Salisbury, Wiltshire	House	Earlier	28 February 1952	SU1419629742; 51°04′01″N 1°47′56″W	1023616	55 The Close More images
73 The Close	Salisbury, Wiltshire	House	C17-C18	28 February 1952	SU1427029236; 51°03′44″N 1°47′52″W	1023634	73 The Close More images
97 Crane Street	Salisbury, Wiltshire	House	Late C17-Early 18th century	12 October 1972	SU1419029806; 51°04′03″N 1°47′56″W	1023637	97 Crane Street More images
38 Catherine Street	Salisbury, Wiltshire	House	Early 19th century	12 October 1972	SU1451829832; 51°04′04″N 1°47′39″W	1023576	38 Catherine Street More images
52 Endless Street	Salisbury, Wiltshire	House	18th century	28 February 1952	SU1449030292; 51°04′18″N 1°47′40″W	1023650	52 Endless Street More images
68a The Close	Salisbury, Wiltshire	House	1972	12 October 1972	SU1412629429; 51°03′50″N 1°47′59″W	1023628	Upload Photo
95 and 96 Exeter Street	Salisbury, Wiltshire	House	Late 18th century	28 February 1952	SU1455229482; 51°03′52″N 1°47′37″W	1023658	95 and 96 Exeter Street More images
11 The Close	Salisbury, Wiltshire	House	Earlier	28 February 1952	SU1448029630; 51°03′57″N 1°47′41″W	1023587	11 The Close More images
45 Castle Street	Salisbury, Wiltshire	House	17th century	29 February 1952	SU1434430214; 51°04′16″N 1°47′48″W	1023557	45 Castle Street
25 The Close	Salisbury, Wiltshire	House	14th century	28 February 1952	SU1432329680; 51°03′59″N 1°47′49″W	1023603	25 The Close More images
82 and 84 Crane Street	Salisbury, Wiltshire	House	Late 18th century	28 February 1952	SU1423629824; 51°04′03″N 1°47′54″W	1023640	82 and 84 Crane Street
8 The Close	Salisbury, Wiltshire	House	Late 17th century	28 February 1952	SU1444229614; 51°03′56″N 1°47′43″W	1023586	8 The Close More images
38 The Close	Salisbury, Wiltshire	House	C16/C17	28 February 1952	SU1426629690; 51°03′59″N 1°47′52″W	1023610	38 The Close More images
56 and 58 High Street	Salisbury, Wiltshire	House	LATER 18th century	12 October 1972	SU1426529782; 51°04′02″N 1°47′52″W	1023687	56 and 58 High Street More images
91 Castle Street	Salisbury, Wiltshire	House	18th century	12 October 1972	SU1436230346; 51°04′20″N 1°47′47″W	1023563	91 Castle Street
64 High Street	Salisbury, Wiltshire	House	Earlier	28 February 1952	SU1426329762; 51°04′01″N 1°47′52″W	1023688	64 High Street More images
30 The Close	Salisbury, Wiltshire	House	Mid 19th century	12 October 1972	SU1428129663; 51°03′58″N 1°47′51″W	1023606	30 The Close More images
52 and 54 High Street	Salisbury, Wiltshire	House	Later	28 February 1952	SU1426029795; 51°04′02″N 1°47′52″W	1023686	52 and 54 High Street More images
13 Market Place	Salisbury, Wiltshire	House	C16/C17	12 October 1972	SU1440229966; 51°04′08″N 1°47′45″W	1242773	13 Market Place More images
2 Salt Lane	Salisbury, Wiltshire	House	1972	12 October 1972	SU1455630162; 51°04′14″N 1°47′37″W	1243083	2 Salt Lane
47 Winchester Street	Salisbury, Wiltshire	House	Mid 17th century	28 February 1952	SU1468330060; 51°04′11″N 1°47′31″W	1243388	47 Winchester Street More images
15 and 17 Guilder Lane	Salisbury, Wiltshire	House	Late 17th century	25 March 1974	SU1478529988; 51°04′09″N 1°47′25″W	1243456	15 and 17 Guilder Lane More images
31 and 31a Market Place	Salisbury, Wiltshire	House	Late 18th century	28 February 1952	SU1433030038; 51°04′10″N 1°47′49″W	1242703	31 and 31a Market Place
38 and 40 Silver Street	Salisbury, Wiltshire	House	Early 18th century	28 February 1952	SU1435329951; 51°04′07″N 1°47′48″W	1243160	38 and 40 Silver Street More images
16 The Close	Salisbury, Wiltshire	House	18th century	28 February 1952	SU1449629658; 51°03′58″N 1°47′40″W	1252131	16 The Close
17 The Close	Salisbury, Wiltshire	House	1442-1443	28 February 1952	SU1448929669; 51°03′58″N 1°47′41″W	1252153	17 The Close More images
23 The Close	Salisbury, Wiltshire	House	16th century	28 February 1952	SU1434229734; 51°04′00″N 1°47′48″W	1253075	23 The Close More images
29 The Close	Salisbury, Wiltshire	House	19th century	12 October 1972	SU1429529664; 51°03′58″N 1°47′51″W	1253156	29 The Close More images
17 and 18 Queen Street	Salisbury, Wiltshire	House	Early 19th century	26 April 1968	SU1452730014; 51°04′09″N 1°47′39″W	1258697	17 and 18 Queen Street More images
2 St Nicholas's Road	Salisbury, Wiltshire	House	1952	28 February 1952	SU1437829228; 51°03′44″N 1°47′46″W	1259072	2 St Nicholas's Road More images
21, 21a and 21b Milford Street	Salisbury, Wiltshire	House	14th century	12 October 1972	SU1463129960; 51°04′08″N 1°47′33″W	1258040	21, 21a and 21b Milford Street More images
53 Payne's Hill	Salisbury, Wiltshire	House	LATE C17/EARLY 18th century	28 February 1952	SU1481629738; 51°04′00″N 1°47′24″W	1258443	53 Payne's Hill
3 and 5 Minster Street	Salisbury, Wiltshire	House	19th century	28 February 1952	SU1436129970; 51°04′08″N 1°47′47″W	1258203	3 and 5 Minster Street More images
16 and 18 St Nicholas's Road	Salisbury, Wiltshire	House	17th century	28 February 1952	SU1435329079; 51°03′39″N 1°47′48″W	1259075	16 and 18 St Nicholas's Road More images
33 New Street	Salisbury, Wiltshire	House	Late 18th century	28 February 1952	SU1440429769; 51°04′01″N 1°47′45″W	1258363	33 New Street More images
27 The Close	Salisbury, Wiltshire	House	Mid 18th century	28 February 1952	SU1431029663; 51°03′58″N 1°47′50″W	1261925	27 The Close More images
7–17 Minster Street	Salisbury, Wiltshire	House	C18/EARLY 19th century	28 February 1952	SU1436129992; 51°04′09″N 1°47′47″W	1258214	7–17 Minster Street More images
51 and 52 The Close	Salisbury, Wiltshire	House	C16/C17	12 October 1972	SU1426029731; 51°04′00″N 1°47′52″W	1261505	51 and 52 The Close More images
24 St Edmund's Church Street	Salisbury, Wiltshire	House	17th century OR EARLIER	28 February 1952	SU1469230112; 51°04′13″N 1°47′30″W	1273211	24 St Edmund's Church Street More images
46 and 46a Silver Street	Salisbury, Wiltshire	House	REFRONTED 18th century	28 February 1952	SU1432929947; 51°04′07″N 1°47′49″W	1273027	46 and 46a Silver Street More images
8 St Nicholas's Road	Salisbury, Wiltshire	House	18th century	28 February 1952	SU1435029186; 51°03′43″N 1°47′48″W	1273156	Upload Photo
87 and 89 Crane Street	Salisbury, Wiltshire	House	Altered	12 October 1972	SU1423829794; 51°04′02″N 1°47′53″W	1355820	87 and 89 Crane Street More images
31 The Close	Salisbury, Wiltshire	House	Earlier	28 February 1952	SU1426929666; 51°03′58″N 1°47′52″W	1355843	31 The Close More images
37 The Close	Salisbury, Wiltshire	House	C17/Earlier	12 October 1972	SU1426329678; 51°03′59″N 1°47′52″W	1355845	37 The Close More images
11 and 13 High Street	Salisbury, Wiltshire	House	Altered 18th century	28 February 1952	SU1430729865; 51°04′05″N 1°47′50″W	1355805	11 and 13 High Street More images
9 The Close	Salisbury, Wiltshire	House	17th century	28 February 1952	SU1444829630; 51°03′57″N 1°47′43″W	1355833	9 The Close More images
34 The Close	Salisbury, Wiltshire	House	Earlier	28 February 1952	SU1422729655; 51°03′58″N 1°47′54″W	1355844	34 The Close More images
93 Castle Street	Salisbury, Wiltshire	House	Late 18th century	12 October 1972	SU1436330351; 51°04′20″N 1°47′47″W	1355861	93 Castle Street
109a, 109b and 109 Exeter Street	Salisbury, Wiltshire	House	Mid 18th century	12 October 1972	SU1453129414; 51°03′50″N 1°47′38″W	1023661	Upload Photo
19 and 21 Winchester Street	Salisbury, Wiltshire	House	CIRCA 1500 ORIGIN	28 February 1952	SU1458430068; 51°04′11″N 1°47′36″W	1243384	19 and 21 Winchester Street More images
8 Queen Street	Salisbury, Wiltshire	House	RESTORED 1930	28 February 1952	SU1453429978; 51°04′08″N 1°47′38″W	1273412	8 Queen Street More images
26 The Close	Salisbury, Wiltshire	House	Late 18th century	28 February 1952	SU1432229662; 51°03′58″N 1°47′49″W	1355841	26 The Close More images
17 and 19 Catherine Street	Salisbury, Wiltshire	House	LATE C18/EARLY 19th century	12 October 1972	SU1455529889; 51°04′05″N 1°47′37″W	1355866	17 and 19 Catherine Street More images
18 St Ann Street	Salisbury, Wiltshire	House	18th century	28 February 1952	SU1463329619; 51°03′57″N 1°47′33″W	1273272	Upload Photo
89–93 Fisherton Street	Salisbury, Wiltshire	House	18th century	12 October 1972	SU1393730124; 51°04′13″N 1°48′09″W	1355798	89–93 Fisherton Street
14 and 14a The Close	Salisbury, Wiltshire	House	18th century	28 February 1952	SU1454029629; 51°03′57″N 1°47′38″W	1262463	14 and 14a The Close More images
53a The Close	Salisbury, Wiltshire	House	1972	28 February 1952	SU1425029722; 51°04′00″N 1°47′53″W	1023613	53a The Close More images
7 and 7a St John's Street	Salisbury, Wiltshire	House	LATE C18/EARLY 19th century	28 February 1952	SU1457629678; 51°03′59″N 1°47′36″W	1273190	7 and 7a St John's Street
60–66 St Ann Street	Salisbury, Wiltshire	House	18th century	28 February 1952	SU1482229663; 51°03′58″N 1°47′23″W	1273236	60–66 St Ann Street
The Old Surgery and Spire View	Salisbury, Wiltshire	House/Surgery	First half of 18th century	28 February 1952	SU1487229688; 51°03′59″N 1°47′21″W	1273228	The Old Surgery and Spire View More images
48 and 48a The Close	Salisbury, Wiltshire	House	17th century	28 February 1952	SU1428629752; 51°04′01″N 1°47′51″W	1253969	48 and 48a The Close More images
35 and 35a The Close	Salisbury, Wiltshire	House	Earlier	28 February 1952	SU1421129656; 51°03′58″N 1°47′55″W	1023608	35 and 35a The Close More images
36a and 36b The Close	Salisbury, Wiltshire	House	Earlier	28 February 1952	SU1425929669; 51°03′58″N 1°47′52″W	1253217	36a and 36b The Close More images
34 and 36 St Ann Street	Salisbury, Wiltshire	House	C16/C17	28 February 1952	SU1470929635; 51°03′57″N 1°47′29″W	1258823	Upload Photo
33 The Close	Salisbury, Wiltshire	House	Earlier	28 February 1952	SU1426929639; 51°03′57″N 1°47′52″W	1023607	33 The Close More images
1 Queen Street	Salisbury, Wiltshire	House	Altered 18th century	28 February 1952	SU1451329958; 51°04′08″N 1°47′39″W	1258452	1 Queen Street More images
54 St Ann Street	Salisbury, Wiltshire	House	18th century	28 February 1952	SU1479829664; 51°03′58″N 1°47′25″W	1258869	54 St Ann Street
19a Milford Street	Salisbury, Wiltshire	House	14th century ORIGIN	28 February 1952	SU1461729963; 51°04′08″N 1°47′34″W	1259793	19a Milford Street
22 St Ann Street	Salisbury, Wiltshire	House	C16/C17	28 February 1952	SU1467829620; 51°03′57″N 1°47′31″W	1258815	22 St Ann Street More images
20 Queen Street	Salisbury, Wiltshire	House	EARLY/MID 18th century	28 February 1952	SU1452430031; 51°04′10″N 1°47′39″W	1273319	20 Queen Street More images
50 and 50a The Close	Salisbury, Wiltshire	House	C16/C17	28 February 1952	SU1426529754; 51°04′01″N 1°47′52″W	1355807	50 and 50a The Close More images
19 and 21 High Street	Sherston, Wiltshire	House	1951	12 December 1951	ST8529785872; 51°34′17″N 2°12′49″W	1023244	Upload Photo
1 and 3 Cliff Road	Sherston, Wiltshire	House	c. 1680	12 December 1951	ST8522985950; 51°34′20″N 2°12′52″W	1283388	Upload Photo
58 Stallard Street	Trowbridge, Wiltshire	House	Early 19th century	26 November 1976	ST8534757951; 51°19′14″N 2°12′42″W	1021658	Upload Photo
14 The Halve	Trowbridge, Wiltshire	House	Late 18th century	29 December 1950	ST8594658169; 51°19′21″N 2°12′11″W	1364197	Upload Photo
66 Fore Street	Trowbridge, Wiltshire	House	17th century or earlier	29 December 1950	ST8551658070; 51°19′18″N 2°12′33″W	1364229	Upload Photo
2 and 3 Fore Street	Trowbridge, Wiltshire	House	c. 1700	29 December 1950	ST8546858024; 51°19′16″N 2°12′36″W	1183060	Upload Photo
67 Fore Street	Trowbridge, Wiltshire	House	16th century and 17th century	29 December 1950	ST8550658061; 51°19′17″N 2°12′34″W	1183208	Upload Photo
38, 40 Market Place	Warminster, Wiltshire	House	Late C18-Early 19th century	28 April 1952	ST8752345040; 51°12′16″N 2°10′48″W	1036228	Upload Photo
25 North Street	Wilton, Wiltshire	House	Modern	4 August 1951	SU0972331314; 51°04′52″N 1°51′45″W	1023723	25 North Street
15 and 16 Queen Street	Salisbury, Wiltshire	Inn	15th century	28 February 1952	SU1454830014; 51°04′09″N 1°47′37″W	1258686	15 and 16 Queen Street More images
16 and 17 Market Place	Salisbury, Wiltshire	Jettied House	EARLY/MID 17th century	28 February 1952	SU1438429988; 51°04′09″N 1°47′46″W	1242726	16 and 17 Market Place More images
53–59 Newtown	Bradford-on-Avon, Wiltshire	Row	17th century or early 18th century	7 November 1963	ST8239461014; 51°20′53″N 2°15′15″W	1036094	53–59 Newtown More images
94–100 High Street	Corsham, Wiltshire	Row	17th century	20 December 1960	ST8731670627; 51°26′04″N 2°11′02″W	1183013	94–100 High Street More images
3 Fish Row	Salisbury, Wiltshire	Shop	Modern	12 October 1972	SU1449929962; 51°04′08″N 1°47′40″W	1023665	3 Fish Row More images
26–32 Tory	Bradford-on-Avon, Wiltshire	Terrace	late 18th century early 19th century	7 November 1963	ST8226960962; 51°20′51″N 2°15′22″W	1364474	Upload Photo
33–37 Tory	Bradford-on-Avon, Wiltshire	Terrace	late 18th century early 19th century	7 November 1963	ST8225560937; 51°20′50″N 2°15′22″W	1036139	Upload Photo
43 Kingsbury Street	Marlborough, Wiltshire	Timber Framed House	1654-6	18 July 1949	SU1887769252; 51°25′19″N 1°43′48″W	1365409	Upload Photo
36 Silver Street	Salisbury, Wiltshire	Timber Framed House	15th century	28 February 1952	SU1436129954; 51°04′07″N 1°47′47″W	1243156	36 Silver Street More images
48–52 Silver Street	Salisbury, Wiltshire	Timber Framed House	C15/C16	28 February 1952	SU1431529946; 51°04′07″N 1°47′49″W	1243171	48–52 Silver Street More images
14 Queen Street	Salisbury, Wiltshire	Timber Framed House	15th century WITH ALTERATIONS	12 October 1972	SU1452830001; 51°04′09″N 1°47′39″W	1258661	14 Queen Street More images
49 New Canal	Salisbury, Wiltshire	Timber Framed House	C14/C15 Re-erected	28 February 1952	SU1435129880; 51°04′05″N 1°47′48″W	1258309	49 New Canal
42 and 44 Silver Street	Salisbury, Wiltshire	Timber Framed House	C15/C16	28 February 1952	SU1434029949; 51°04′07″N 1°47′48″W	1243161	42 and 44 Silver Street More images
24 High Street	Highworth, Highworth, Swindon	Town House	Early 18th century	26 January 1955	SU2007792443; 51°37′50″N 1°42′41″W	1299927	Upload Photo
Hamptworth Lodge	Redlynch, Wiltshire	House	Early 17th century	9 February 1973	SU2274019537; 50°58′29″N 1°40′39″W	1184207	Upload Photo
Handel House	Devizes, Wiltshire	House	18th century	9 April 1954	SU0068561405; 51°21′06″N 1°59′30″W	1252375	Handel House More images
Handle House at Studley Mills	Trowbridge, Wiltshire	Textile Mill	1843-48	16 October 1974	ST8538457937; 51°19′13″N 2°12′40″W	1283742	Handle House at Studley Mills More images
Hannington Hall	Hannington Hall, Hannington, Swindon	House	1653	26 January 1955	SU1781293172; 51°38′13″N 1°44′38″W	1023333	Hannington Hall More images
Hans Farmhouse	Castle Combe, Wiltshire	Farmhouse	c. 1700	20 December 1960	ST8479877406; 51°29′43″N 2°13′13″W	1022885	Upload Photo
Hardenhuish House (Chippenham Grammar School)	Chippenham, Wiltshire	Manor House	Late 18th century	22 June 1978	ST9122274542; 51°28′11″N 2°07′40″W	1268100	Upload Photo
Hatch House	Pythouse Park, West Tisbury, Wiltshire	Country House	17th century	6 January 1966	ST9088228154; 51°03′10″N 2°07′53″W	1318818	Upload Photo
Heathcote House	Devizes, Wiltshire	House	Early to mid 18th century	9 April 1954	SU0083661171; 51°20′59″N 1°59′22″W	1252376	Heathcote House
Heytesbury House	Heytesbury, Wiltshire	Country House	Earlier building	1 July 1986	ST9319742825; 51°11′05″N 2°05′55″W	1198088	Upload Photo
Heywood House	Heywood Park, Heywood, Wiltshire	Country House	1837	5 November 1987	ST8758253461; 51°16′49″N 2°10′46″W	1284971	Upload Photo
Highworth Court, Highworth House	Highworth, Swindon	House	1956	26 January 1955	SU2001792476; 51°37′51″N 1°42′44″W	1185156	Upload Photo
Hill House Farmhouse	Middlehill, Box, Wiltshire	Farmhouse	16th century to 17th century	20 December 1960	ST8206168929; 51°25′09″N 2°15′34″W	1022800	Upload Photo
Hilperton House	Hilperton, Wiltshire	Detached House	Early 18th century	13 November 1962	ST8716459248; 51°19′56″N 2°11′08″W	1194189	Upload Photo
Wallington Hall	Bradford-on-Avon, Wiltshire	House	post 1532 pre 1715	18 April 1952	ST8250860979; 51°20′51″N 2°15′09″W	1036037	Wallington Hall More images
Hook Manor	Wardour, Sedgehill and Semley, Wiltshire	Detached House	1637 in building accounts	6 January 1966	ST9171426643; 51°02′21″N 2°07′10″W	1146052	Upload Photo
Horningsham Congregational Chapel	Horningsham, Wiltshire	Congregational Chapel	c. 1700	11 September 1968	ST8120541136; 51°10′09″N 2°16′13″W	1036378	Horningsham Congregational Chapel More images
Hungerford Chantry, 54, The Close	Salisbury, Wiltshire	House	1294	28 February 1952	SU1420729738; 51°04′00″N 1°47′55″W	1023614	Hungerford Chantry, 54, The Close More images
Hyde Close, the Hermitage	Marlborough, Wiltshire	House	17th century	21 October 1974	SU1854368915; 51°25′08″N 1°44′05″W	1258407	Upload Photo
Idmiston Manor	Idmiston, Wiltshire	House	c. 1600	10 January 1953	SU1981337318; 51°08′05″N 1°43′06″W	1355682	Idmiston Manor More images
Iford Manor	Iford, Westwood, Wiltshire	Manor House	Late 15th century or 16th century	19 October 1983	ST8006058922; 51°19′45″N 2°17′15″W	1158288	Iford Manor More images
Iford Manor	Iford, Westwood, Wiltshire	Manor House	Late 17th century	13 November 1962	ST8006058922; 51°19′45″N 2°17′15″W	1364056	Iford Manor More images
Image Bridge	Wilton Park, Wilton, Wiltshire	Bridge	1822	8 June 1978	SU1056231062; 51°04′44″N 1°51′02″W	1200120	Upload Photo
International Stores, the Poultry Cross	Salisbury, Wiltshire	Shop	Modern	28 February 1952	SU1437929972; 51°04′08″N 1°47′46″W	1242725	International Stores, the Poultry Cross More images
Ivy House	Corsham, Wiltshire	House	Early 18th century	20 December 1960	ST8725870637; 51°26′05″N 2°11′05″W	1022106	Ivy House
Jaggards House	Corsham, Wiltshire	House	15th century	20 December 1960	ST8542668545; 51°24′57″N 2°12′39″W	1022056	Upload Photo
Jenner's School	Cricklade, Wiltshire	School	1652	17 January 1955	SU0995493582; 51°38′27″N 1°51′27″W	1356089	Jenner's School More images
Jesmond House	Highworth, Swindon	House	1721	26 January 1955	SU2000992460; 51°37′50″N 1°42′44″W	1023386	Upload Photo
Johnson's Bakery	Corsham, Wiltshire	House	Early 18th century	20 December 1960	ST8730470590; 51°26′03″N 2°11′02″W	1183008	Johnson's Bakery More images
Kellaways Farmhouse	Kellaways, Langley Burrell Without, Wiltshire	Dairy	Early 19th century	20 December 1960	ST9502575456; 51°28′41″N 2°04′23″W	1199380	Upload Photo
Kennet and Avon Canal, Avoncliff Aqueduct	Winsley, Wiltshire	Aqueduct	c. 1810	14 June 1988	ST8043060008; 51°20′20″N 2°16′56″W	1021876	Kennet and Avon Canal, Avoncliff Aqueduct More images
Kent House	Amesbury, Wiltshire	Farmhouse	1607	10 January 1953	SU1540241723; 51°10′28″N 1°46′52″W	1131093	Upload Photo
Kestrels	Easterton, Wiltshire	House	Early 18th century	19 March 1962	SU0193854940; 51°17′37″N 1°58′25″W	1364630	Upload Photo
Kilvert's Parsonage	Langley Burrell Without, Wiltshire	House	Possible earlier core	22 December 1960	ST9299674927; 51°28′24″N 2°06′08″W	1022357	Upload Photo
King John's House	Tollard Royal, Wiltshire	Cross Wing House with medieval Hall house core	17th century	6 January 1966	ST9441917662; 50°57′30″N 2°04′51″W	1146279	King John's House More images
King John's Hunting Lodge	Lacock, Wiltshire	House	18th century	20 December 1960	ST9165868566; 51°24′58″N 2°07′17″W	1283925	King John's Hunting Lodge More images
King's House and Attached Garden and Front Terrace Walls and Railings	Malmesbury, Wiltshire	House	Early 18th century	18 January 1949	ST9327286977; 51°34′54″N 2°05′55″W	1269312	Upload Photo
Kings Old Rectory	Broad Chalke, Wiltshire	Detached House	15th century	23 March 1960	SU0397625303; 51°01′37″N 1°56′41″W	1146135	Upload Photo
Kitchen Courtyard Walls	Wilton Park, Wilton, Wiltshire	Gate Pier	c. 1801	8 June 1978	SU0993231038; 51°04′43″N 1°51′35″W	1283183	Upload Photo
Kitchener's Arms	Trowbridge, Wiltshire	House	Early 18th century	29 December 1950	ST8538058050; 51°19′17″N 2°12′40″W	1197964	Upload Photo
Knowle House	Little Bedwyn, Wiltshire	House	Mid 18th century	30 July 1986	SU2544967444; 51°24′20″N 1°38′08″W	1034002	Upload Photo
Lacock Bridge	Lacock, Wiltshire	Bridge	Late Medieval to 17th century	20 December 1960	ST9222368102; 51°24′43″N 2°06′48″W	1022127	Lacock Bridge More images
Lamp Standards in Front of Town Hall on North Side	Devizes, Wiltshire	Lamp Post		19 September 1972	SU0046361340; 51°21′04″N 1°59′41″W	1252309	Upload Photo
Landford Manor	Landford, Wiltshire	Detached House	c. 1600	23 March 1960	SU2621220161; 50°58′49″N 1°37′41″W	1300292	Landford Manor More images
Langley House	Langley Burrell Without, Wiltshire	Kitchen	1780	20 December 1960	ST9286275785; 51°28′52″N 2°06′15″W	1199409	Upload Photo
Lansdowne Arms Hotel and Former Coach House, Stable and Brewhouse	The Strand, Calne, Wiltshire	House	Early 18th century	19 May 1950	ST9971471007; 51°26′17″N 2°00′20″W	1247495	Lansdowne Arms Hotel and Former Coach House, Stable and Brewhouse More images
Latimer Manor	West Kington, Nettleton, Wiltshire	Farmhouse	16th century	20 December 1960	ST8074477151; 51°29′35″N 2°16′44″W	1183476	Latimer Manor
Law Courts and County Police Office	Devizes, Wiltshire	Steps	1835	9 April 1954	SU0014261690; 51°21′15″N 1°59′58″W	1251744	Law Courts and County Police Office More images
Leigh All Saints Old Chancel	Leigh, Wiltshire	Church	1955	17 January 1955	SU0582892843; 51°38′04″N 1°55′02″W	1023137	Leigh All Saints Old Chancel More images
Leigh House and Gatepiers	Westbury, Wiltshire	House	late 17th century early 18th century	29 December 1950	ST8646250198; 51°15′03″N 2°11′43″W	1036318	Upload Photo
Liddington Manor	Liddington, Wiltshire	Manor House	Mid 17th century	26 January 1955	SU2096081444; 51°31′53″N 1°41′57″W	1023399	Liddington Manor
Little Clarendon	Dinton, Wiltshire	Cross Wing House	Late 16th century	23 March 1960	SU0147431568; 51°05′00″N 1°58′49″W	1146116	Upload Photo
Little Orchard	Barford St. Martin, Wiltshire	Cruck House	15th century	17 December 1986	SU0548131576; 51°05′01″N 1°55′23″W	1284295	Upload Photo
Little Park Farm	Royal Wootton Bassett, Wiltshire	Farmhouse	Early 17th century	15 August 1985	SU0544380330; 51°31′19″N 1°55′23″W	1200300	Upload Photo
Lockeridge House	Lockeridge, West Overton, Wiltshire	House	18th century	27 February 1958	SU1470468113; 51°24′43″N 1°47′24″W	1182796	Lockeridge House More images
Loder House, 16, Endless Street	Salisbury, Wiltshire	House	Late 18th century	28 February 1952	SU1450730181; 51°04′15″N 1°47′40″W	1355825	Loder House, 16, Endless Street
London Road Inn	Salisbury, Wiltshire	Timber Framed House	C16/C17	12 October 1972	SU1485430049; 51°04′10″N 1°47′22″W	1023693	London Road Inn More images
Long Hall	Stockton, Wiltshire	Detached House	15th century	11 September 1968	ST9817638185; 51°08′35″N 2°01′39″W	1036492	Upload Photo
Lower Berrycourt Farmhouse	Donhead St Mary, Wiltshire	Farmhouse	Late Medieval	6 July 1987	ST9102923532; 51°00′40″N 2°07′45″W	1146098	Upload Photo
Luckington Court	Luckington, Wiltshire	House	16th century or earlier	12 December 1951	ST8368084069; 51°33′19″N 2°14′12″W	1022373	Luckington Court More images
Lynchetts	Bradford-on-Avon, Wiltshire	Town House	Earlier than 1785	18 April 1952	ST8284561007; 51°20′52″N 2°14′52″W	1364485	Lynchetts More images
Main Block of Abbey Mills	Bradford-on-Avon, Wiltshire	Rubber Works	1875	18 April 1952	ST8250160939; 51°20′50″N 2°15′10″W	1200197	Main Block of Abbey Mills More images
Manor Farm	Corsley, Wiltshire	Farmhouse	c. 1560	11 September 1968	ST8290546742; 51°13′11″N 2°14′46″W	1285731	Upload Photo
Manor Farmhouse	Hannington Wick, Hannington, Swindon	Farmhouse	Apparently Mid-Late 17th century	26 January 1955	SU1722395283; 51°39′22″N 1°45′09″W	1355980	Upload Photo
Manor Farmhouse	Berwick Bassett, Wiltshire	Cross Passage House	Late C15-early 16th century	27 February 1958	SU0995073410; 51°27′34″N 1°51′29″W	1033872	Upload Photo
Manor Farmhouse	Tytherton Lucas, Bremhill, Wiltshire	Manor House	16th century	25 November 1987	ST9481474420; 51°28′07″N 2°04′34″W	1363805	Upload Photo
Manor Farmhouse	Etchilhampton, Wiltshire	Farmhouse	Early 16th century	19 March 1962	SU0495460184; 51°20′27″N 1°55′49″W	1365962	Upload Photo
Manor Farmhouse	Hankerton, Wiltshire	Cross Wing House	c. 1600	2 May 1977	ST9771890922; 51°37′02″N 2°02′04″W	1363896	Upload Photo
Manor Farmhouse	Wootton Rivers, Wiltshire	Farmhouse	16th century	27 May 1964	SU1974362898; 51°21′53″N 1°43′04″W	1035779	Upload Photo
Manor House	Broad Blunsdon, Blunsdon St. Andrew, Swindon	House	Early 17th century	26 January 1955	SU1523890725; 51°36′55″N 1°46′53″W	1355999	Upload Photo
Manor House	Broughton Gifford, Wiltshire	House	Early 17th century	13 November 1962	ST8795963497; 51°22′13″N 2°10′28″W	1251184	Upload Photo
Manor House	Cholderton, Wiltshire	Farmhouse	c. 1710	10 January 1953	SU2249042328; 51°10′47″N 1°40′47″W	1183831	Upload Photo
Manor House	Ham, Wiltshire	Manor House	17th century	30 July 1986	SU3291462936; 51°21′52″N 1°31′43″W	1034060	Manor House More images
Manor House	Hill Deverill, Longbridge Deverill, Wiltshire	Cross Passage House	Late 16th century	1 July 1986	ST8694440172; 51°09′38″N 2°11′17″W	1200745	Manor House
Manor House	Ogbourne St George, Wiltshire	Manor House	17th century	27 February 1958	SU1951674671; 51°28′14″N 1°43′14″W	1284455	Upload Photo
Manor House	Tockenham Wick, Tockenham, Wiltshire	Manor House	c. 1600	17 January 1955	SU0357581147; 51°31′45″N 1°56′59″W	1200259	Upload Photo
Manor House	Winterbourne Dauntsey, Winterbourne, Wiltshire	House	c. 1720	10 January 1953	SU1756834689; 51°06′40″N 1°45′02″W	1135722	Upload Photo
Manor House	Winterbourne Stoke, Wiltshire	Manor House	Early 17th century	10 October 1988	SU0759040965; 51°10′04″N 1°53′34″W	1130971	Upload Photo
Manor House and Manor Cottage	Rodbourne Cheney, Swindon	House	Late 16th century	2 October 1951	SU1383986577; 51°34′40″N 1°48′06″W	1023468	Manor House and Manor Cottage More images
Market House Chambers, Martins Bank	Salisbury, Wiltshire	House	Early 18th century	28 February 1952	SU1432330126; 51°04′13″N 1°47′49″W	1023552	Upload Photo
Marwarden Court	Salisbury, Wiltshire	House	Late C16/Early 17th century	12 October 1972	SU1301532506; 51°05′30″N 1°48′56″W	1243256	Marwarden Court More images
Maud Heath's Causeway (raised section each side of Kellaways Bridge)	Kellaways, Langley Burrell Without, Wiltshire	Bridge	1961	20 December 1960	ST9474375780; 51°28′51″N 2°04′38″W	1022351	Maud Heath's Causeway (raised section each side of Kellaways Bridge) More images
Men's Almhouses & Walled Forecourt with Gateway to Nos 1 to 4	Bradford-on-Avon, Wiltshire	Almshouses	1700	18 April 1952	ST8256860724; 51°20′43″N 2°15′06″W	1200482	Men's Almhouses & Walled Forecourt with Gateway to Nos 1 to 4 More images
Milford Hall	Salisbury, Wiltshire	House/Hotel	c. 1800	28 February 1952	SU1434730632; 51°04′29″N 1°47′48″W	1355865	Milford Hall More images
MoD Corsham: Quarry Operations Centre (QOC) Murals	Box, Wiltshire	Limestone Quarry	Extensively quarried from the 1840s	20 March 2013	ST8477669218; 51°25′18″N 2°13′13″W	1409132	MoD Corsham: Quarry Operations Centre (QOC) Murals
Monkton House with attached Garden Walls	Broughton Gifford, Wiltshire	House	Late 16th century	13 November 1962	ST8834862340; 51°21′36″N 2°10′07″W	1262912	Monkton House with attached Garden Walls More images
Monument to Adye Family in the Churchyard, 1m south-west of Porch, Parish Church	Easton Grey, Wiltshire	Chest Tomb	1731	3 December 1986	ST8807887634; 51°35′15″N 2°10′25″W	1283728	Monument to Adye Family in the Churchyard, 1m south-west of Porch, Parish Church
Moxhams	Bradford-on-Avon, Wiltshire	House	18th century	18 April 1952	ST8285660988; 51°20′52″N 2°14′51″W	1036161	Moxhams More images
Mr Bevirs's Office	Wootton Bassett, Wiltshire	House	1700/03	17 January 1955	SU0673782543; 51°32′30″N 1°54′15″W	1300222	Upload Photo
National Westminster Old Bank	Devizes, Wiltshire	Building	Late 18th century	9 April 1954	SU0040561433; 51°21′07″N 1°59′44″W	1263031	National Westminster Old Bank More images
Neston Park	Corsham, Wiltshire	Country House	c. 1800	20 December 1960	ST8620667143; 51°24′11″N 2°11′59″W	1021961	Neston Park More images
Netheravon House	Netheravon, Wiltshire	Villa	Post 1734	3 June 1986	SU1473948285; 51°14′01″N 1°47′25″W	1299956	Netheravon House More images
Netherhampton House	Netherhampton, Wiltshire	House	Late 19th century	23 March 1960	SU1105229747; 51°04′01″N 1°50′37″W	1181782	Netherhampton House More images
Newcourt Farmhouse	Downton, Wiltshire	Semi Detached House	Late 17th century	23 March 1960	SU1730022200; 50°59′56″N 1°45′17″W	1300463	Upload Photo
No 14 (the Porch House), with Cottage and Garage Range to East	Lacock, Wiltshire	House	16th century	20 December 1960	ST9154568406; 51°24′53″N 2°07′23″W	1198431	No 14 (the Porch House), with Cottage and Garage Range to East More images
No 5 (Rodney House) with Its Stable Yard and Wall and Garden Railings	Trowbridge, Wiltshire	Town House	built soon after	29 December 1950	ST8584758013; 51°19′16″N 2°12′16″W	1364175	Upload Photo
Nonsuch House	Westbrook, Bromham, Wiltshire	House	Early 18th century	19 March 1962	ST9619666036; 51°23′36″N 2°03′22″W	1033860	Upload Photo
Northgate House (formerly Judge's Lodging, now the Municipal Offices)	Devizes, Wiltshire	House	Mid 18th century	9 April 1954	SU0013361638; 51°21′14″N 1°59′58″W	1251684	Northgate House (formerly Judge's Lodging, now the Municipal Offices) More images
Norton Bavant House, with Attached Garden Walls to West	Norton Bavant, Wiltshire	Country House	Late 17th century	11 September 1968	ST9063743387; 51°11′23″N 2°08′07″W	1036419	Norton Bavant House, with Attached Garden Walls to West
Norton Manor	Norton, Wiltshire	Manor House	Early 17th century	12 December 1951	ST8848984397; 51°33′30″N 2°10′03″W	1023215	Upload Photo
No 6 St John's Street and adjoining Office Premises to North	Devizes, Wiltshire	Shop	1975	9 April 1954	SU0045261398; 51°21′06″N 1°59′42″W	1252257	Upload Photo
No 6, Oxford St and attached Outbuildings	Malmesbury, Wiltshire	House	c. 1861	18 January 1949	ST9334487231; 51°35′02″N 2°05′51″W	1269303	No 6, Oxford St and attached Outbuildings More images
No 61, St Mary St and attached Rear Garden Walls	Chippenham, Wiltshire	House	1702	25 April 1950	ST9222673304; 51°27′31″N 2°06′48″W	1267913	Upload Photo
Nos 3 and 5, Gloucester St and attached Wall	Malmesbury, Wiltshire	House	Early 19th century	1 July 1976	ST9327887225; 51°35′02″N 2°05′54″W	1269449	Nos 3 and 5, Gloucester St and attached Wall More images
Nunton House	Nunton, Odstock, Wiltshire	House	c. 1720	23 March 1960	SU1601626046; 51°02′01″N 1°46′23″W	1181829	Nunton House More images
Odstock Manor House	Odstock, Wiltshire	House	Late 17th century	23 March 1960	SU1481026032; 51°02′00″N 1°47′25″W	1023845	Upload Photo
Officers' Mess and Quarters	RAF Netheravon, Figheldean, Wiltshire	Officers Mess	1914	10 October 1988	SU1543148860; 51°14′19″N 1°46′49″W	1284240	Officers' Mess and Quarters
Ogbourne Maisey House	Ogbourne Maizey, Ogbourne St. Andrew, Wiltshire	House	Late C16-early 17th century	2 September 1986	SU1861071552; 51°26′34″N 1°44′01″W	1182289	Ogbourne Maisey House More images
Old Baptist Chapel	Chippenham, Wiltshire	Baptist Chapel	c. 1834	25 April 1950	ST9210973301; 51°27′31″N 2°06′54″W	1268156	Old Baptist Chapel More images
Old Brewery House and attached Gateway, Walls, Piers and Railings	Malmesbury, Wiltshire	House	1672	18 January 1949	ST9334887290; 51°35′04″N 2°05′51″W	1269289	Old Brewery House and attached Gateway, Walls, Piers and Railings More images
Old Manor House	Sutton Veny, Wiltshire	Cross Passage House	Mid 14th century	11 September 1968	ST9053241565; 51°10′24″N 2°08′13″W	1183551	Upload Photo
Old Rectory	Allington, Wiltshire	House	1987	29 May 1987	SU2009838648; 51°08′48″N 1°42′51″W	1183731	Upload Photo
Old Rectory	Idmiston, Wiltshire	House	1987	10 January 1953	SU1968437372; 51°08′07″N 1°43′12″W	1135690	Upload Photo
Old Ship Hotel	Mere, Wiltshire	House	17th century	6 January 1966	ST8121932404; 51°05′26″N 2°16′10″W	1130748	Old Ship Hotel More images
Old Swan House	Sherston, Wiltshire	House	1986	12 December 1951	ST8527785869; 51°34′17″N 2°12′50″W	1355982	Old Swan House More images
Old Town Cross, in Churchyard of Church of St Sampson	Cricklade, Wiltshire	Town Cross	14th century	17 January 1955	SU0995893574; 51°38′27″N 1°51′27″W	1182771	Old Town Cross, in Churchyard of Church of St Sampson More images
Orpin's House	Bradford-on-Avon, Wiltshire	House	Late 17th century	18 April 1952	ST8236860881; 51°20′48″N 2°15′16″W	1200276	Orpin's House More images
Outbuilding to south of Blackland Mill	Blackland, Calne Without, Wiltshire	Outbuilding	c. 1810	31 July 1986	SU0159369214; 51°25′19″N 1°58′43″W	1253255	Outbuilding to south of Blackland Mill
132 and 133 and Outhouse to rear of 133, High Street	Marlborough, Wiltshire	House	16th century	18 July 1949	SU1880169160; 51°25′16″N 1°43′52″W	1034230	132 and 133 and Outhouse to rear of 133, High Street More images
Overtown House	Wroughton, Swindon	House	c. 1700	26 January 1955	SU1549179722; 51°30′58″N 1°46′41″W	1185738	Upload Photo

== See also ==
- List of Grade I listed buildings in Wiltshire
- Grade II* listed buildings in Wiltshire
