= Birinus =

7th-century Bishop of Dorchester

Saint Birinus
- Bishop of Dorchester
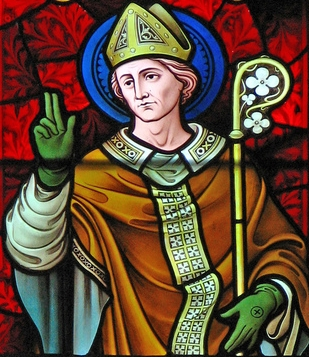
- Stained glass window of Birinus at Dorchester Abbey
- Appointed: before 634
- Term ended: 3 December 649
- Predecessor: diocese established
- Successor: Agilbertus

Orders
- Consecration: by Asterius of Milan

Personal details
- Born: c. 600 Francia
- Died: 3 December 649 or 650 Dorchester, Wessex (England)

Sainthood
- Feast day: 3 December (Catholic); 4 September (Anglican)
- Venerated in: Roman Catholic Church; Eastern Orthodox Church; Anglican Communion
- Attributes: Bishop, sometimes baptising a king
- Patronage: Berkshire; Dorchester
- Shrines: Dorchester Abbey, now destroyed. Small parts survive. Modern replica now in place. (Or Winchester Cathedral, now destroyed.)

Birinus (also Berin, Birin; c. 600 – 3 December 649 or 650) was the first Bishop of Dorchester and was known as the "Apostle to the West Saxons" for his conversion of the Kingdom of Wessex to Christianity. He is venerated as a saint by the Roman Catholic Church, the Eastern Orthodox Church, and Anglican churches.

== Life and ministry ==
After Augustine of Canterbury performed the initial conversions in England, Birinus, a Frank, came to the kingdom of Wessex in 634, landing at the port of Hamwic, now in the St Mary's area of Southampton. During Birinus's brief time at Hamwic, St Mary's Church was founded.

A Benedictine monk, Birinus had been made bishop by Asterius in Genoa, and Pope Honorius I created the commission to convert the West Saxons. In 635, he persuaded the West Saxon king Cynegils to allow him to preach. Cynegils was trying to create an alliance with Oswald of Northumbria, with whom he intended to fight the Mercians. At the final talks between kings, the sticking point was that Oswald, a Christian, would not ally himself with a pagan. Cynegils then converted and was baptised. He gave Birinus Dorchester-on-Thames for his episcopal see. Birinus's original commission entailed preaching to parts of Britain where no missionary efforts had reached and may have included instructions to reach the Mercians. But he ultimately remained in Wessex.

Birinus is said to have been active in establishing churches in Wessex: foundations ascribed to him include St Mary's in Reading, St Peter and St Paul, Checkendon, near Reading, and the first church at Ipsden, built about two miles from the present church. Birinus baptised Cynegils's son Cwichelm (died 636) in 636 and grandson Cuthred (died 661) in 639, to whom he stood as godfather.

Birinus died in Dorchester on 3 December in 649 or 650.

== Veneration ==
Birinus' feast day is 3 December in the Roman Catholic Church and Eastern Orthodox Church, but some churches celebrate his feast on 5 December. His feast was added to the Roman Martyrology in the late 16th century. In the Church of England, his feast day falls on 4 September and has the status of a commemoration. His relics were eventually translated to Winchester after his death.

A small number of Church of England parish churches are dedicated to Birinus, including those at Berinsfield in Oxfordshire and Redlynch in Wiltshire. The Catholic church in Dorchester, one of the first built after the restoration of the hierarchy by Pope Pius IX, is also dedicated to Birinus.

In 2013, a new stained glass window by the artist Thomas Denny, was unveiled in the porch of the parish church of St Michaels, Easthampstead, Bracknell. The window depicts the baptism of Cynegils, King of Wessex, by Birinius.

== See also ==
- Church of St Birinus, Morgan's Vale
- St Birinus School (Didcot)
- Lantfred wrote a vita

Christian titles
New title	Bishop of Dorchester; 634–649	Succeeded by Agilbertus
