= King John's House =

King John's House may refer to two houses in England:

- King John's House, Romsey, Hampshire
- King John's House, Tollard Royal, Wiltshire
