= Ockwell's Glove Factory =

Municipal building in Cricklade, Wiltshire, England

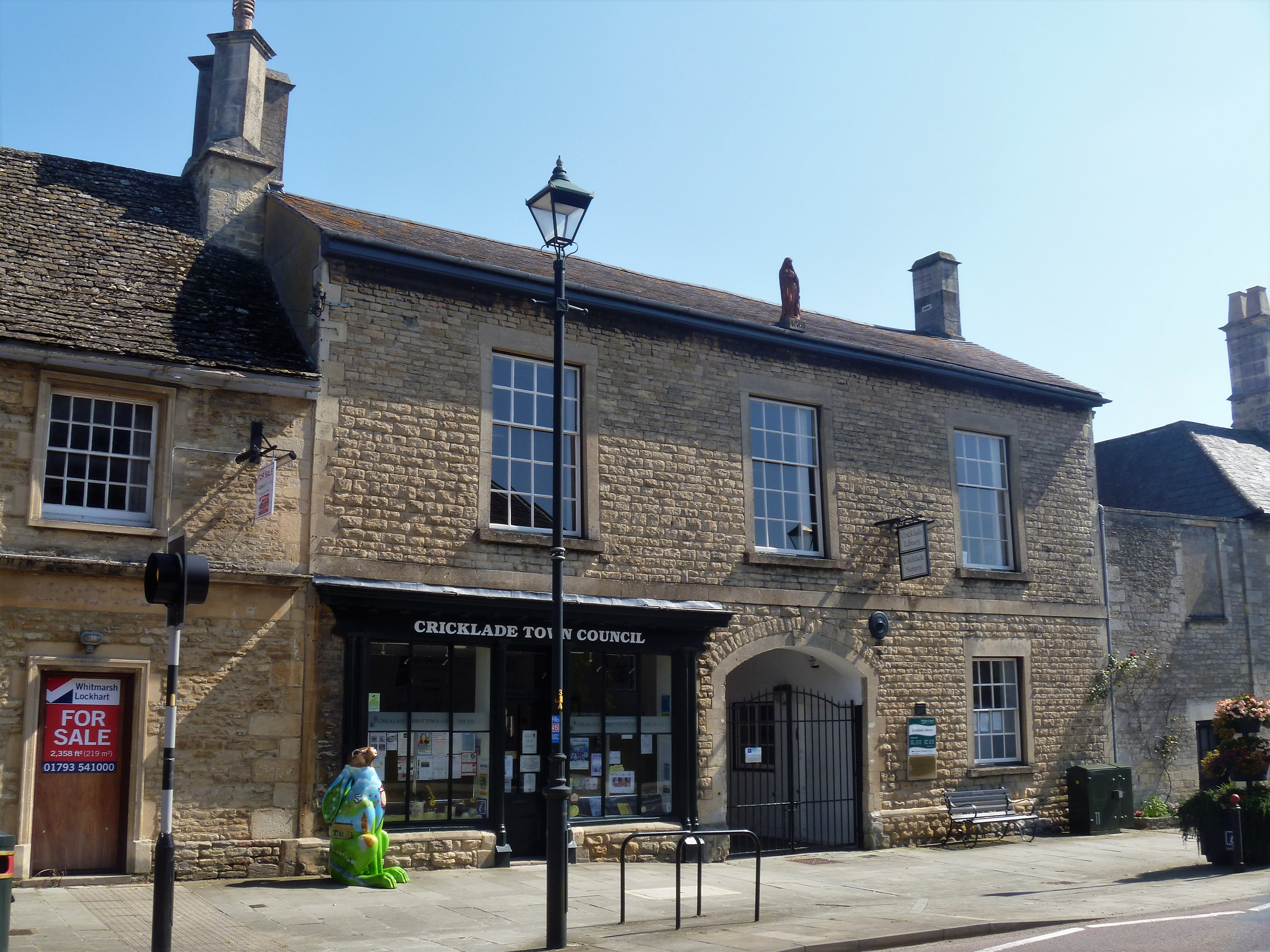
- The building in 2019

- Shown in Wiltshire
- 51.6404°N 1.8566°W
- Location: High Street, Cricklade

History
- Built: 1861

Site notes
- Architect: James Lansdown
- Architectural style: Neoclassical style

Listed Building – Grade II
- Official name: Ockwell's Glove Factory
- Designated: 24 August 1976
- Reference no.: 1023124

Ockwell's Glove Factory, also known as the Old Town Hall, is a historic building in Cricklade, a town in Wiltshire in England. The building, which currently accommodates the offices and meeting place of Cricklade Town Council, is a Grade II listed building.

== History ==
A town hall, supported by ten pillars, which previously stood in the High Street, dated back to 1569. Following charges of corruption brought against more than half the local 240 electors in the constituency in the 1768 general election, the rights of local people to elect members of parliament was severely diluted under the Parliamentary Elections (Cricklade) Act 1782, and by the end of the century the aldermen, who had met in the old town hall, had ceased to be appointed. The old town hall, dilapidated and redundant, was demolished in 1818.

In the mid-19th century, a local builder, George Lansdown, decide to commission a new town hall. It was designed by James Lansdown in the neoclassical style, built in limestone rubble and was completed in 1861. The building was used for meetings of the parish council, the petty sessions, and the manorial courts. In 1862, while St Sampson's Church was being restored, services were held in the town hall.

In 1933, after a new town hall was constructed about 100 yards (91 m) to the southwest along the High Street, the old building was sold to Charles Ockwell & Company, a glove manufacturer, which was the town's largest employer. Ockwell converted the old building into a factory and installed electrically powered sewing machines. In the inter-war period, the business struggled because of cheap supplies of surplus army stores from the US and because of competition from Hong Kong. During the Second World War, the building was extended, to increase production on military contracts. However, in the postwar period demand for gloves fell steadily and the company closed in 1994.

In 1996, the building was purchased by North Wiltshire District Council. A project to convert the building into offices was financed by Wiltshire County Council, North Wiltshire District Council and Cricklade Town Council. In 2000, the conversion works commenced, and in 2002, Cricklade Town Council relocated to the ground floor of the building, while the town's library, which had been based at Bath Road since 1972, moved into the first floor. There was also space created for a doctor's surgery, which also relocated from Bath Road, and a tourist information centre.

== Architecture ==
The two-storey building is three bays wide, and has a central carriage entrance with iron gates in the central bay. It is built of limestone rubble, with a Welsh slate roof. The left-hand bay on the ground floor is fenestrated by a shop front, while the right-hand bay on the ground floor and all the bays on the first floor are fenestrated by sash windows with architraves. On the roof, there is a central statue of Ceres, which is said to have come from the Great Exhibition. Internally, the principal room is the assembly hall which is 50 feet (15 m) long. The building was grade II listed in 1976.
