= Hamptworth =

Hamlet in Wiltshire, England

Coordinates: 50.975°N 1.654°W

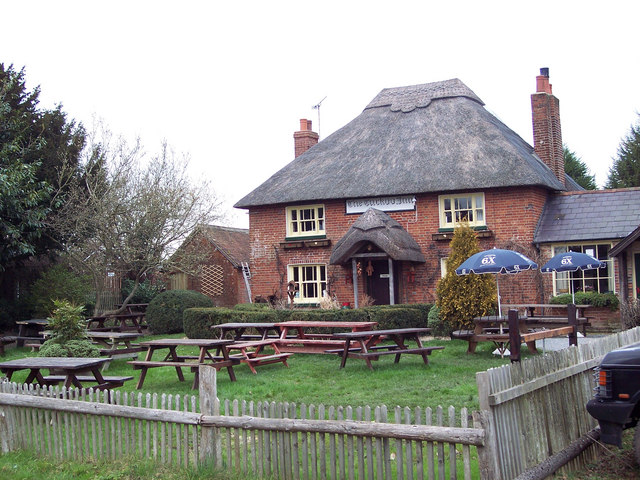
- The Cuckoo Inn

- Location within Wiltshire
- OS grid reference: SU244196
- Civil parish: Landford
- Unitary authority: Wiltshire
- Ceremonial county: Wiltshire
- Region: South West
- Country: England
- Sovereign state: United Kingdom
- Post town: SALISBURY
- Postcode district: SP5
- Dialling code: 01794
- Police: Wiltshire
- Fire: Dorset and Wiltshire
- Ambulance: South Western
- UK Parliament: Salisbury

Hamptworth is a hamlet in Wiltshire, England, in the extreme southeast of the county. It is in the civil parish of Landford, and lies within the boundaries of the New Forest National Park.

Hamptworth is first mentioned in the early 13th century. Manor Farm dates from the 15th century. From the 17th to late 19th century, settlement consisted of farms along the Redlynch-Landford road. The area was once a tithing of the parish of Downton, and later became a ward of Redlynch parish. A community governance review effective 1 April 2017 transferred the eastern portion of Redlynch parish, including Hamptworth, to Landford.

Hamptworth has a pub, the Cuckoo Inn, an early 18th-century building. Hamptworth also has a golf club, Hamptworth Golf Club, which has one of the UK's only Par 6 at 666 Yards called 'The Beast'. The course was designed and constructed in 1994 by Philip Sanders and Brian D Pierson.

The local school is the New Forest Primary School which has two sites: for younger children at Landford and older children at Nomansland. The latter began as a National School of 1867 on Hamptworth common, then in the 20th century the village of Nomansland expanded to surround it.

A Wesleyan Methodist chapel was built in 1876 near the north end of Lyburn Road; it closed in the 1970s.

Hamptworth Lodge is a country house built in 1912 in the Tudor style, to designs of Sir Guy Dawber. It was built to replace a seventeenth-century building, parts of which have been incorporated into the present structure. It is constructed of Flemish bond brick with timber-framing and has a tiled roof and ornamental brick chimney stacks. The house is Grade II* listed.
