= St George's Church, Langham =

Church in Dorset, England

St George's Church
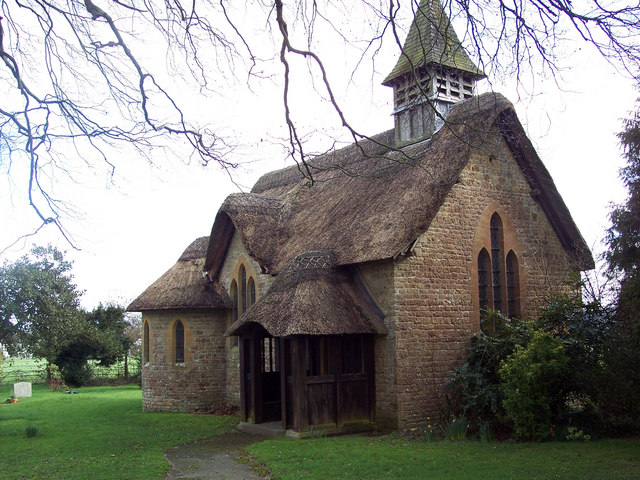

Religion
- Affiliation: Church of England
- Ecclesiastical or organizational status: Active

Location
- Location: Langham, Gillingham, Dorset, England
- Interactive map of St George's Church
- Coordinates: 51.0376°N 2.3025°W

Architecture
- Architect: Charles Ponting
- Type: Church
- Completed: 1921

St George's Church is a Church of England church in Langham, Gillingham, Dorset, England. It was designed by Charles Ponting and built in 1921. It has been a Grade II listed building since 1985. Today the church is used for occasional services, and is maintained by the Manger family trust.

== History ==
St George's was erected as a chapel of ease to the Gillingham parish church of St Mary the Virgin. The idea of building a small church at Langham, a hamlet to the west of Gillingham, originated with Mr. Alfred T. Manger of Stock Hill House, who was aware of the inconvenient distance of the parish church for residents of Langham and its surrounding farmhouses and dwellings. He intended to erect a small church on his estate, but died in 1917 before his plans were realised. In accordance with his wishes, Mr. Manger was buried in a vault on the site of his intended church on 29 January 1917. The site was consecrated by the Bishop of Salisbury, the Right Rev. Frederick Ridgeway, prior to interment.

With his death, the family of Mr. Manger announced their intention to build a church in his memory once World War I ended. The church, designed by the diocesan architect Charles Ponting, was built in 1921 over the tomb of Mr. Manger and his wife, who died in 1919. It was dedicated by the Archdeacon of Sherborne, the Right Rev. Albert Joscelyne on 22 May 1921. Lieutenant Colonel Charles Harwood Manger, the eldest son of Mr. Manger, had the church dedicated to Saint George, the patron saint of soldiers, in memory of his brother, Lieutenant John Kenneth Manger, cousin, Private George Bredin Kitson, and brother-in-law, Second Lieutenant Robert Lancaster, who all fell during World War I.

== Architecture ==
St George's is built of coursed and squared rubble stone, with a thatched roof and bellcote at the west end, containing one bell. Designed to accommodate up to 40 people, it is made up of a nave, apse, north transept and north porch. The original fittings and ornaments are largely of oak, including the lectern and altar. A marble slab in front of the altar marks the tomb of Mr. and Mrs. Manger.
