= Lantfred =

10–11th century Anglo-Saxon monk

Lantfred of Fleury (Latin: Lantfredus; Old English: Landfrið; Old High German: Landfred), also known as Lantfred of Winchester, was a 10th and 11th century Anglo-Saxon monk who lived in Winchester, Hampshire, England. He was originally from the French town of Fleury-sur-Loire. Lantfred is famous for having written Vita S. Swithuni ("The Life of St. Swithun") and Translatio et miracula S. Swithuni ("The Translation and Miracles of St. Swithun"), the oldest known account of St. Swithun's life. He also wrote Vita S. Birini ("The Life of St. Birinus").
