= Bohemia, Wiltshire =

Hamlet in Wiltshire, England

Coordinates: 50.975°N 1.703°W

Bohemia
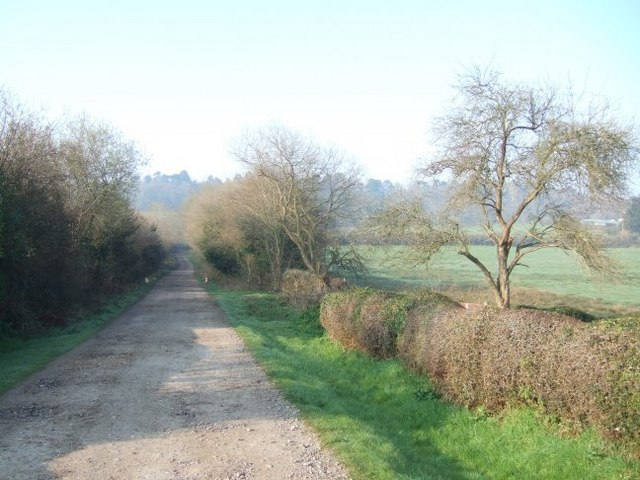

- Location within Wiltshire
- OS grid reference: SU209196
- Civil parish: Redlynch
- Unitary authority: Wiltshire
- Ceremonial county: Wiltshire
- Region: South West
- Country: England
- Sovereign state: United Kingdom
- Post town: Salisbury
- Postcode district: SP5
- Dialling code: 01725
- Police: Wiltshire
- Fire: Dorset and Wiltshire
- Ambulance: South Western
- UK Parliament: Salisbury

Bohemia is a hamlet in Wiltshire, England, in the parish of Redlynch. It lies about 1 mile (1.6 km) southeast of Redlynch and 7.5 miles (12 km) southeast of Salisbury.
