= Cricklade Town Hall =

Municipal building in Cricklade, Wiltshire, England

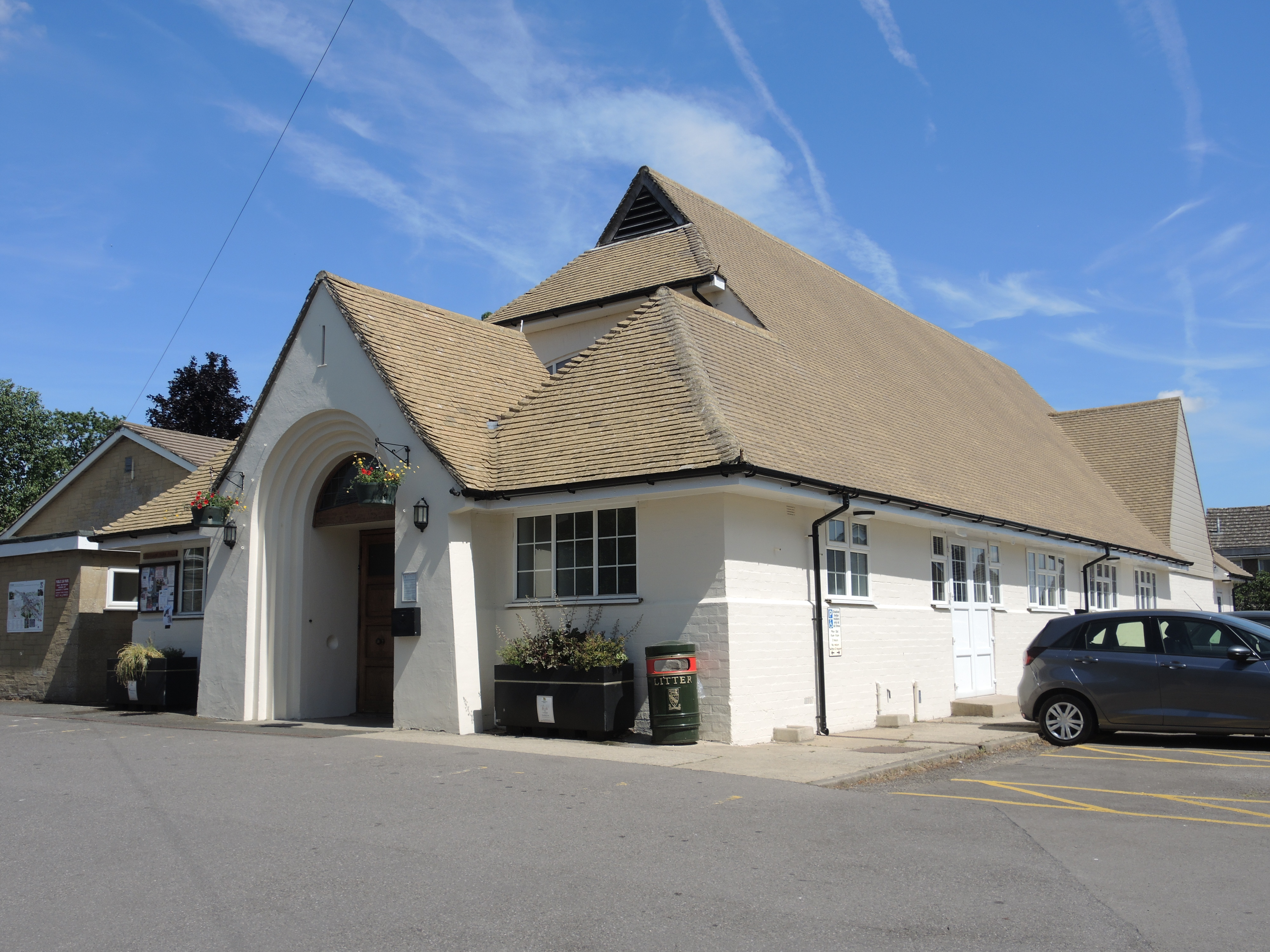
- The building in May 2025

- Shown in Wiltshire
- 51.6397°N 1.8569°W
- Location: High Street, Cricklade

History
- Built: 1933

Site notes
- Architect: Eric Cole
- Architectural style: Arts and Crafts Movement style

Cricklade Town Hall is an events venue in the High Street in Cricklade, a town in Wiltshire in England. It currently hosts a variety of community events, including a weekly cinema and annual school assemblies.

== History ==
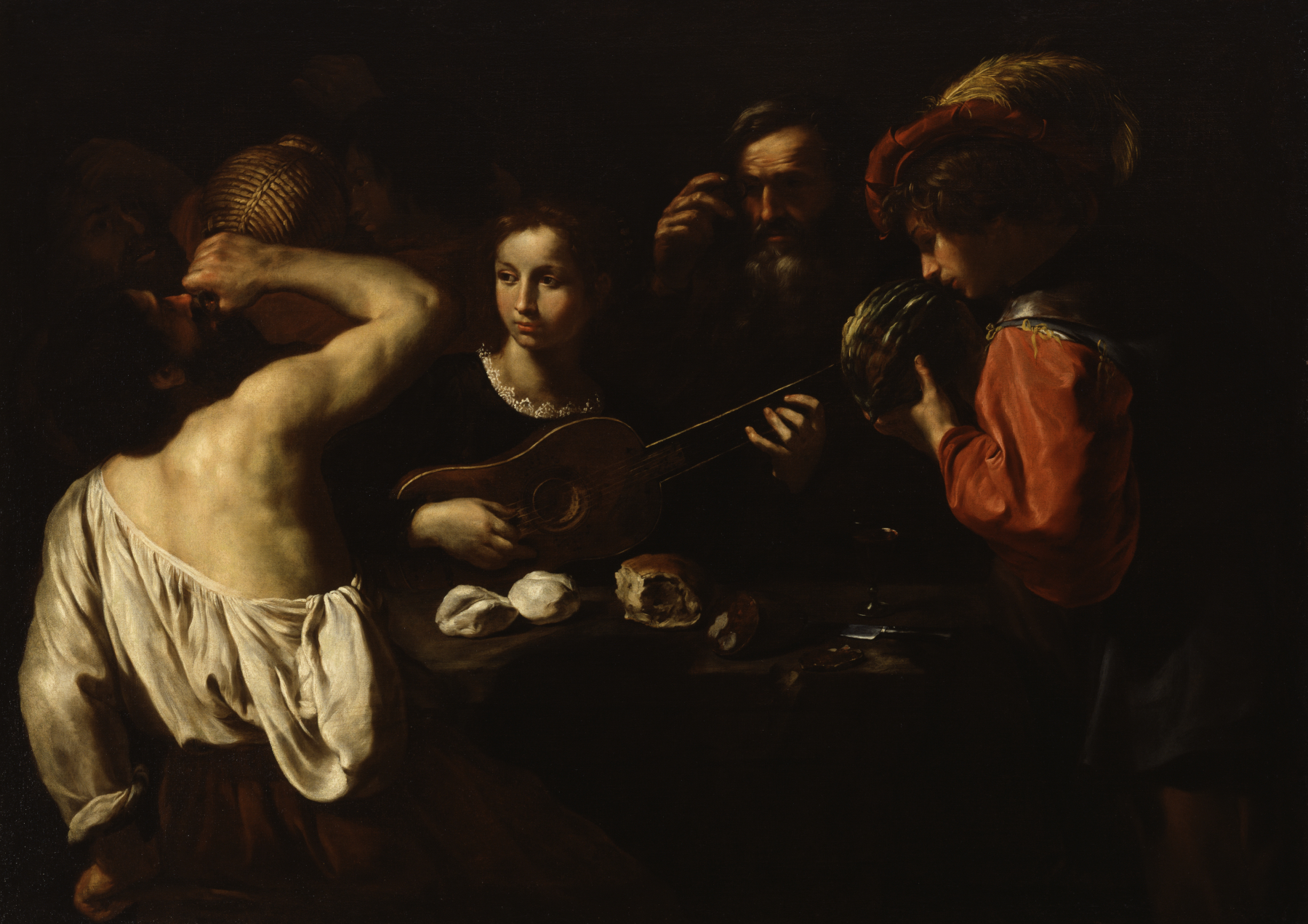
"Les Cinq Sens" (Allegory of the Five Senses), a painting by Pietro Paolini, which hung on a wall in the town hall from 1945 to 1993

The town hall was commissioned to replace the old town hall in the High Street. The site that civic leaders selected was open land about 100 yards (91 m) along the High Street to the southwest of the old town hall. Construction on the new building started in 1932. It was designed by Eric Cole of Cirencester in the Arts and Crafts movement style, reminiscent of the work of Charles Voysey. It was built by Baldwin Brothers of Fairford in brick with a cement render and was completed in 1933.

The design involved a symmetrical main frontage of three bays facing onto the High Street. The central bay formed a porch, which was projected forward and contained a doorway with a fanlight, an archivolt, and a gable above. The outer bays formed pavilions, which were fenestrated by casement windows and surmounted by pitched roofs. The main hall, which was laid out behind the central bay, was lit by a large Diocletian window facing towards the High Street, and surmounted by a steep pitched roof. It incorporated a main hall, with a stage and a sprung dance floor, and a committee room.

In October 1945, a painting was donated to the hall by a local doctor, Frank Lewarne. It was identified, in 1993, as "Les Cinq Sens" (Allegory of the Five Senses), by Pietro Paolini, an Old Master from the school of Caravaggio, and was sold at auction for £68,000.

The venue hosts a variety of community events, including since 2013 a weekly cinema. After it was extensively refurbished in 2015, the comedian Julian Clary visited the town hall in July 2017 to host the end of year assembly for a local school. Works of art in the town hall include three paintings by Edward James Battar depicting local landscape scenes.
