= Devizes Assize Court =

Municipal building in Devizes, Wiltshire, England

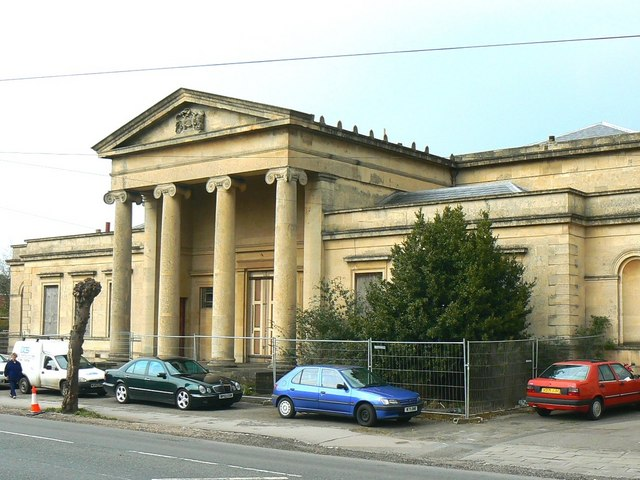
- The building in 2007

- Shown in Wiltshire
- 51.3542°N 1.9995°W
- Location: Northgate Street, Devizes

History
- Built: 1835

Site notes
- Architect: Thomas Henry Wyatt
- Architectural style: Greek Revival style

Listed Building – Grade II*
- Official name: Law courts and county police office
- Designated: 9 April 1954
- Reference no.: 1251744

Devizes Assize Court is a judicial building in Northgate Street in Devizes, a town in Wiltshire, England. The building, which is currently vacant and deteriorating, is a Grade II* listed building.

== History ==
The building was designed by Thomas Henry Wyatt in the Greek Revival style, built in Bath stone and was completed in 1835. The design involved a symmetrical main frontage of 11 bays facing onto Northgate Street. The central section of three bays featured a tetrastyle portico formed by four Ionic order columns supporting an entablature and a pediment with a coat of arms in the tympanum. There was a tall double door at the back of the portico. The wings of three bays each were fenestrated by windows with cornices and, at roof level, they were surmounted by cornices and parapets. The end bays, which were recessed, contained niches and, at roof level, were also surmounted by cornices and parapets. Internally, there was a square central hall leading to the courtrooms, which had holding cells below.

In the 19th century, the judicial functions of the county were discharged at Devizes Assize Court in the summer and at Salisbury Assize Court in the lent. The court was the venue of the trial of Rebecca Smith for infanticide. She was found guilty and, on 23 August 1849, became the last woman in England to be hanged for that crime. It was also the venue of the trial of Constance Kent for the murder of her half-brother, Francis Saville Kent. She was found guilty and sentenced to life imprisonment in July 1865.

The first meeting of the provisional Wiltshire County Council took place under the chairmanship of John Thynne, 4th Marquess of Bath in Devizes Assize Court on 31 January 1889. The courthouse continued to host the local assizes and, from 1972, hearings of the local magistrates' court until the building was closed by the Lord Chancellor's Department in the 1980s. It then lay vacant and deteriorating.

=== 21st century ===
In 2006–7, Kennet District Council, supported by the Wiltshire Historic Buildings Trust, initiated a study into potential uses for the building. In 2018, a newly established body, the Devizes Assize Court Trust, acquired the building with the aim of converting it into a new home for the Wiltshire Museum. The Devizes Assize Court Trust announced plans to create exhibition galleries and spaces for community events. In June 2023, the National Lottery Heritage Fund awarded funding of £300,000 to the museum to enable it to develop plans for the project before applying for a full National Lottery grant in 2025. An application for planning consent for the works, being developed to a design by Purcell, was submitted to Wiltshire Council in August 2024.

== See also ==
- Grade II* listed buildings in Wiltshire (H–O)
