= Landford Heath =

Protected area in Wiltshire, England

Coordinates: 50.95902°N 1.62406°W

Landford Heath (grid reference SU265178) is an 11.75 hectare biological Site of Special Scientific Interest near Landford in southeast Wiltshire, England. It was notified in 1994.

== Sources ==
- Natural England citation sheet for the site (accessed 7 April 2022)
