= Landford Bog =

Nature reserve in Wiltshire, England

Coordinates: 50.96534°N 1.63255°W

Landford Bog (grid reference SU259185) is an 11.6 hectare biological Site of Special Scientific Interest at Landford in southeast Wiltshire, England. It was notified in 1987.

The site is managed as a nature reserve by Wiltshire Wildlife Trust.

== Sources ==
- Natural England citation sheet for the site (accessed 7 April 2022)
