= Lover, Wiltshire =

Village in Wiltshire, England

Coordinates: 50.980°N 1.704°W

Lover
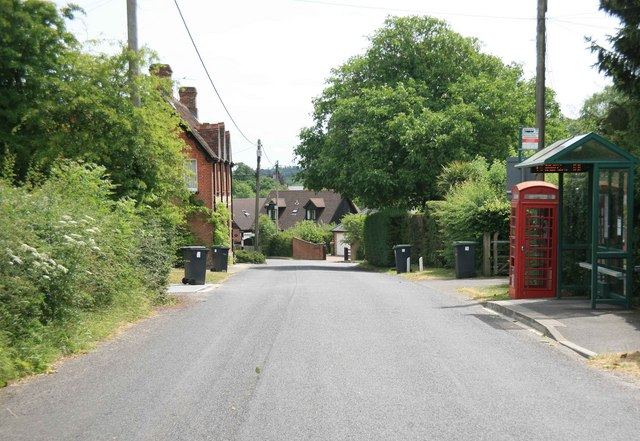

- Location within Wiltshire
- OS grid reference: SU209201
- Civil parish: Redlynch
- Unitary authority: Wiltshire
- Ceremonial county: Wiltshire
- Region: South West
- Country: England
- Sovereign state: United Kingdom
- Post town: Salisbury
- Postcode district: SP5
- Dialling code: 01725
- Police: Wiltshire
- Fire: Dorset and Wiltshire
- Ambulance: South Western
- UK Parliament: Salisbury

Lover (pronounced like Dover, /ˈloʊvər/) is a small village in Wiltshire, England, close to the county border with Hampshire. It is part of the parish of Redlynch and lies about 1 mile (1.6 km) southeast of Redlynch and 7.5 miles (12 km) southeast of the city of Salisbury. The village is within the boundaries of the New Forest National Park.

The settlement was once called Warminster Green, but by 1876 it was known as Lover, possibly a corruption of Lower Redlynch. Lover consists of three roads that connect together to form a triangle. These are Besomer Drove, School Road and Church Hill. The name Besomer Drove refers to the tradition of broom-making in the area.

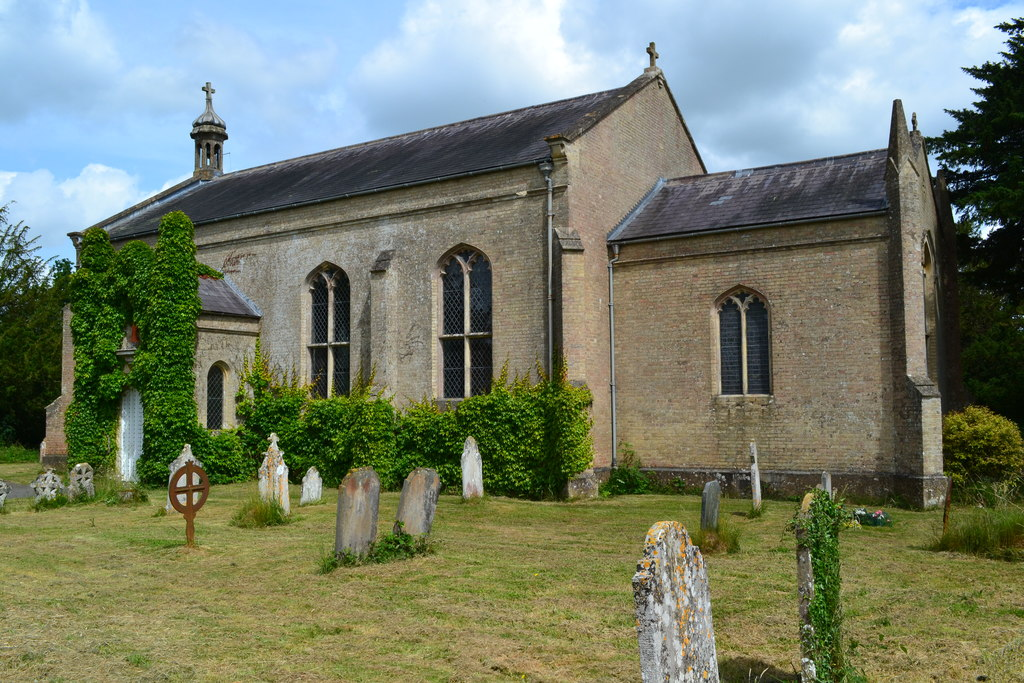
St Mary's Church

Lover has St Mary's church, built in 1837 to serve the Redlynch area. Nearby is Redlynch Village Hall.

A National School was built c. 1839 and rebuilt in 1878; it became Redlynch Church of England Voluntary Aided Primary School. After the school closed in 2006 its playing fields were transferred to the parish council. Renamed Lover Green, the area is maintained by the community and is the venue for the annual Lover Country Fayre. In 2016 the school buildings were bought by the community.

The Lover post office used to do much business around Valentine's Day, as items posted there were postmarked "Lover". Although the post office was regarded as a "vital" service for the 100 people a week who used it, it was closed on 2 April 2008. Since the closure, a temporary post office opens during the week of Valentine's Day so that the cards can be stamped with "Lover".

Lover also once had a village shop and pub, but both have been closed.
