= Church of St Birinus, Morgan's Vale =

Church in Morgan's Vale, Wiltshire, England

Church of St Birinus
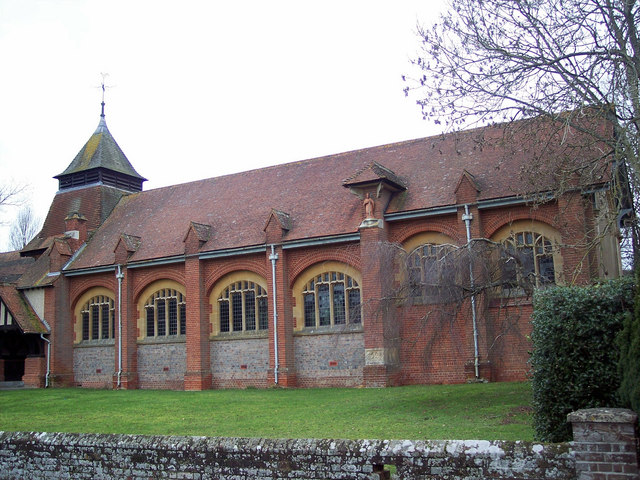

Religion
- Affiliation: Church of England
- Ecclesiastical or organizational status: Active
- Year consecrated: 1896

Location
- Location: Morgan's Vale, Wiltshire, England
- Interactive map of Church of St Birinus
- Coordinates: 50.9887°N 1.7182°W

Architecture
- Architect: Charles Ponting
- Type: Church
- Style: Gothic Revival

The Church of St Birinus is a Church of England church in Morgan's Vale, Wiltshire, England. It was designed by Charles Ponting and constructed in 1894–1896. The church has been a Grade II listed building since 1985.

== History ==
The Church of St Birinus was built as a chapel of ease to St Laurence in the parish of Downton. Prior to its construction, an earlier building doubling as a chapel of ease and infant school was erected in 1868–69 to serve the village. The infant school opened in January 1869 and the chapel opened for Divine service on 21 February 1869.

The new church was built through the bequest of Rev. Edward Augustus Ferryman of Redlynch House, who died in 1884. He left £2,000 towards the construction of a church and £4,000 for its endowment, with the money to be made available on the death of his wife. Rev. Ferryman intended for the church to be built in memory of his uncle, Charles Theobold Maud who died in Bath in 1877.

After Mrs. Ferryman died in December 1891, the new church scheme commenced. The chosen site for the church, next to the existing chapel/school, formed part of the land purchased in 1868. Plans for the church were drawn up by Charles Ponting of Marlborough and a local man, Charles Mitchell of Woodfalls, was hired as the builder.

The foundation stone was laid by Horatio Nelson, the 3rd Earl Nelson, on 27 September 1894, and the completed church was consecrated by the Bishop of Salisbury, the Right Rev. John Wordsworth, on 1 February 1896. It cost £2,200 to build.

The church used a harmonium until funds could be raised for an organ. It was made by Messrs. Conacher and Co of Huddersfield for £185, and dedicated by the Bishop of Salisbury on 19 December 1900. The church had no pulpit until 1901, when an anonymous donor enabled the construction of one by Messrs. Jones and Willis of London. The oak pulpit was dedicated on 30 June 1901.

== Architecture and fittings ==
The Church of St Birinus is built of local red brick, with a tiled roof, and dressings in Bath stone. Designed for 160 persons, it is made up of a nave, chancel, organ chamber and west baptistery, the latter having a north vestry and south porch. There is a west tower with a louvred bellcote containing one bell. A hipped gablet above one of the buttresses contains a statue of St Birinus, which was modelled in clay by Miss. A. M. Palmer.

The five-light east window by Heaton, Butler and Bayne (1895) is described as "fine Arts and Crafts" by Historic England, and contains three sections originally installed in the school chapel by Mrs. Ferryman in memory of her husband. The west end of the baptistery and the vestry have mullioned windows of oak. The floor of the nave, baptistery and vestry is paved with wood block, and the chancel and porch with tiles. The original font is of Bath stone and has an oak cover.

== Parish ==
An ecclesiastical district was created for the church in 1915, from parts of Downton and Redlynch parishes. The benefice was united with that of St Mary's, Redlynch in 1968, and today the parish is one of six served by the Forest & Avon Team Ministry.
