= Charles Ponting =

British architect (1850–1932)

- Born: 20 February 1850; Collingbourne Ducis, Wiltshire
- Died: 19 January 1932 (aged 81); Parkstone, Dorset
- Occupation: Architect
- Projects: Dauntsey's School, Wiltshire

Charles Edwin Ponting, F.S.A. (1850–1932) was a Gothic Revival architect who practised in Marlborough, Wiltshire.

== Career ==
Ponting began his architectural career in 1864 in the office of the architect Samuel Overton. He was agent for the Meux brewing family's estate from 1870 until 1888. After Admiral Hedworth Meux inherited Theobalds House in Hertfordshire in 1910, Ponting enlarged the house for him.

In 1883 the Diocese of Salisbury appointed Ponting Surveyor of Ecclesiastical Dilapidations for the Archdeaconry of Wiltshire. Part of the Diocese of Bristol was added to his responsibilities in 1887 and the Diocese of Salisbury added the Archdeaconry of Dorset to his duties in 1892. He resigned from his post with the Bristol Diocese in 1915 and from that with the Salisbury Diocese in 1923.

== Family ==
Ponting married Overton's daughter Martha Margaretta in 1872. She died in 1873 at the age of 20 while giving birth to their twin daughters Martha and Mary. Ponting never remarried, and the twins remained unmarried and lived with him until his death.

== Works ==
- National School, Overton and Fyfield, Wiltshire, 1875
- St. Michael's parish church, West Overton, Wiltshire, 1878
- St. Peter ad Vincula parish church, Broad Hinton, Wiltshire: restoration, 1879
- St David's Welsh Church, Feeder Road, Bristol, 1879 (demolished 1923)
- St. Matthew's parish church, Mere, Wiltshire, 1882
- East Kennett, Wiltshire: village dispensary and parish room, 1884
- All Saints' parish church, Marden, Wiltshire: rebuilding, 1885
- St. Mary, St. Katherine and All Saints' parish church, Edington, Wiltshire: restoration, 1887
- St. Giles' parish church, Stanton St Quintin, Wiltshire: rebuilt chancel, 1888
- St. John the Baptist parish church, Yaverland, Isle of Wight: reredos, 1889
- St. John the Baptist parish church, Pewsey, Wiltshire: restoration, 1889–90
- St. Katherine's parish church, Holt, Wiltshire: rebuilding, 1891
- St. Mary's parish church, Almondsbury, Gloucestershire: oak reredos, 1891
- Almondsbury Institute and Cottage Hospital, 1891
- St. Andrew's parish church, Rockbourne, Hampshire: restoration, 1893
- St. Michael's parish church, Melksham, Wiltshire: oak reredos, 1894
- St. Birinus' parish church, Redlynch, Wiltshire: 1894–96
- Dauntsey's School, West Lavington, Wiltshire, 1895
- All Saints' parish church, Leigh, Wiltshire: relocation & reconstruction, 1896
- St. John's parish church, Bemerton, Wiltshire: restoration, 1896
- St. John the Evangelist parish church, Ford, North Wiltshire, 1897
- St. Michael's parish church, Beer Hackett, Dorset: tower, 1897
- Holy Trinity parish church, Bradpole, Dorset: north aisle, 1897
- St. Andrew's parish church, West Stafford, Dorset: chancel, 1898
- All Saints' parish church, Down Ampney, Gloucestershire: oak reredos, 1899
- St. Thomas' parish church, Southwick, Wiltshire: 1899–1904
- Marlborough Town Hall, Marlborough, Wiltshire, 1901–02
- St. Mary's parish church, Fordingbridge, Hampshire: restoration, 1901–03
- St. George's parish church, Bourton, Dorset: tower, 1903–05
- St. Mary's parish church, Alton Barnes, Wiltshire: restoration, 1904
- Parish church of Christ, Shaw, Wiltshire, 1905
- St. Aldhelm's parish church, Sandleheath, Hampshire, 1907
- St. Stephen's parish church, Kingston Lacy, Dorset, 1907
- Lytes Cary manor house, Somerset: restoration, after 1907
- St. Eustace's parish church, Ibberton, Dorset: restoration, 1907–09
- St. Martin's church, Chickerell Road, Weymouth, 1908 (now redundant)
- Gymnasium, Marlborough College, Wiltshire, 1908
- St. Mary's parish church, Gillingham, Dorset: tower remodelling, 1908–09
- Theobalds House, Hertfordshire: additions including tower, after 1910
- St. Mary the Virgin parish church, West Fordington, Dorchester, Dorset, 1910–12
- Christ Church, Bradford on Avon, Wiltshire: southeast chapel, 1919
- East Bridgford War Memorial Cross, 1920
- St. George's Church, Langham, Gillingham, Dorset: 1921
- St. John the Evangelist, Boreham, Warminster, Wiltshire: baptistery, 1925–26
- St. Peter's parish church, Dorchester, Dorset: reredos

== Sources ==
- Brodie, Antonia; Felstead, Alison; Franklin, Jonathan; Pinfield, Leslie; Oldfield, Jane, eds. (2001). Directory of British Architects 1834–1914, L–Z. London & New York: Continuum. ISBN 0-8264-5514-X.
- Newman, John; Pevsner, Nikolaus (1972). Dorset. The Buildings of England. Harmondsworth: Penguin Books. ISBN 0-14-071044-2.
- Pevsner, Nikolaus; Cherry, Bridget (revision) (1975). Wiltshire. The Buildings of England. Harmondsworth: Penguin Books. ISBN 0-14-071026-4.
- Pevsner, Nikolaus; Lloyd, David (1967). Hampshire and the Isle of Wight. The Buildings of England. Harmondsworth: Penguin Books.
- Verey, David (1970). Gloucestershire: The Cotswolds. The Buildings of England. Harmondsworth: Penguin Books. ISBN 0-14-071040-X.
