= Robert Jenner (MP) =

English merchant

Robert Jenner (c.1584 – 7 December 1651) was an English merchant in the City of London, who acquired land in north Wiltshire and sat in the House of Commons variously between 1628 and 1648.

== Life ==
Robert Jenner was born around 1584; his birthplace is unknown, although he had connections in north Wiltshire and south Gloucestershire, including John Jenner, yeoman of Crudwell, who was probably his brother. By 1617 he had married Elizabeth Longston, daughter of Thomas Longston, citizen and grocer of London.

Jenner completed an apprenticeship under the Goldsmiths' Company, London, in 1613 and by 1615 was employing apprentices of his own. His business specialised in refining silver bullion – either imported or bought from mines in Cumbria – for use in the wire-drawing trade. He prospered and was able to pay £1,400 for a house at Foster Lane in the City of London.

In 1624 he bought the Wiltshire manor of Widhill, near Cricklade (later in Blunsdon parish), together with the nearby manor of Eysey, at that time in Gloucestershire. Eysey was sold in 1630. In 1648 he bought the manor of Marston Meysey, also at that time in Gloucestershire. In the same year he paid for the rebuilding of the derelict chapel at Marston, which was raised in status to a parish church.

With Elizabeth he had a daughter, Anne, who in 1632 (aged 15) was married to Thomas Trevor, later Sir Thomas, the only son of Sir Thomas Trevor of Trevalyn Denbighs, Lord Baron of the Exchequer. It is presumed that Anne died childless before her father as she is not mentioned in his will.

=== Politics ===
In 1628, Jenner was elected Member of Parliament for Cricklade and sat until 1629 when King Charles decided to rule without parliament for eleven years. In April 1640, he was re-elected MP for Cricklade in the Short Parliament. He was re-elected MP for Cricklade in November 1640 for the Long Parliament, and held the seat until he was excluded under Pride's Purge in 1648. Jenner was in favour of taking a milder course with Charles I at the end of the Civil War, and was reprimanded by Oliver Cromwell for his tenderness.

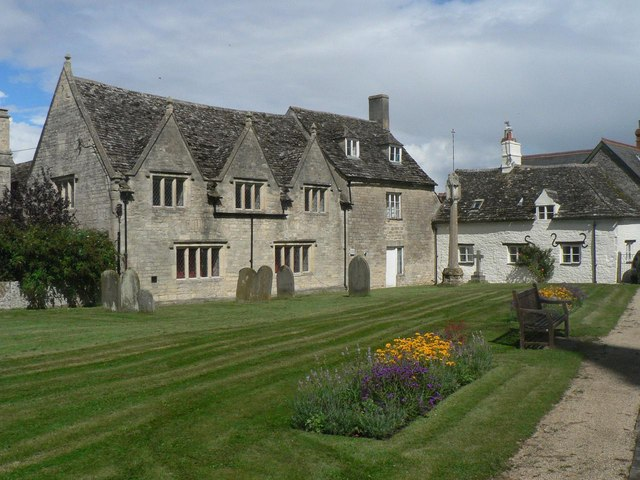
Jenner Hall, Cricklade

== Death and legacy ==
Jenner died on 7 December 1651 at the age of 67, and was buried in Cricklade St Sampson's Church. His chest tomb, in limestone with a black marble top, is in the north aisle of the church.

He left money for eight almshouses in Malmesbury and for the building and maintenance of a free school at Cricklade. Jenner's School, a single large room, was completed in 1652 on a site backing onto St Sampson's churchyard. Later the building became the parish workhouse before going back into use as a school until 1960. It became the Cricklade parish hall and was renamed the Jenner Hall.

Besides those bequests, Jenner made provision for his wife, including a life interest in the Foster Lane house; on her death the house would be granted to the Goldsmith's Company for charitable purposes. Widhill manor was left to his cousin and heir, John Jenner.

Parliament of England
Preceded by Sir William Howard; Sir Robert Hyde	Member of Parliament for Cricklade; 1628–1629; With: Sir Edward Hungerford	Parliament suspended until 1640
Vacant Parliament suspended since 1629	Member of Parliament for Cricklade; 1640 – 1648; With: Thomas Hodges	Not represented in the Rump Parliament
