= Rebecca Smith (murderer) =

British murderer

Rebecca Smith (née Prior; chr. 17 May 1807 – 23 August 1849) was the last British woman to be executed for the infanticide of her own child. She was convicted of killing her infant son Richard, and was publicly hanged at Devizes, Wiltshire. After her trial she confessed to having poisoned seven of her other children.

== Early life ==
Smith was born in the village of Bratton, Wiltshire, the daughter of William and Sarah Prior (or Pryor). Her father, who died in 1830, was a successful yeoman farmer, while her mother was a prominent member of the local Particular Baptist sect. In May 1831, she married an agricultural labourer, Philip Smith, who had a reputation as a drunkard. Their first child, Jane, was born the following year. Ten others followed, none of whom lived more than a few months. In 1846, following her mother's death, Smith inherited £100 (equivalent to $10,000 in 2025) and moved the family to Westbury. Her husband squandered the inheritance, forcing her to find seasonal work as a crop-picker and vegetable grower; consequently, the family lived in "a visible state of poverty and ill health".

== Discovery ==
Smith's eleventh child, Richard, was born on 16 May 1849. He was initially healthy, but was taken ill on 7 June and died on the morning of 12 June. The local registrar, George Shorland, initially recorded the cause of death as unknown but was persuaded by local rumours to order an inquest. Richard's body was exhumed on 22 June and autopsied on 24 June; traces of arsenic were discovered in his stomach. Smith's neighbours claimed that she had made a series of attempts to purchase poison both before and after the birth, culminating in a purchase of "white arsenic" on the morning of 7 June. Inquests into the deaths of two more of her children (Sarah and Edward) were conducted on 18 July, and both their bodies were also found to contain arsenic.

== Trial and execution ==
Smith was put on trial for Richard's death on 9 August 1849, at the Devizes Assize Court. Eighteen witnesses were called, many of whom testified about her attempts to buy poison and false statements she had made about her son's health. The jury took 30 minutes to find her guilty but also issued a recommendation of mercy; the judge ignored this and sentenced her to death. A week after the trial, Smith made a confession to the prison chaplain in which she admitted using rat poison to kill seven of her other children. Of her eleven children, only the first-born survived to adulthood – two died of natural causes, and the other eight were killed. Smith said her husband was an abusive alcoholic, and was terrified that her children would "come to want."

Smith was publicly hanged in Devizes on 23 August 1849, despite two petitions for mercy being sent to the Home Secretary, George Grey. The press and general public were heavily in favour of her execution despite infanticide usually being viewed as less repellent than standard murder and thus less deserving of capital punishment. Factors that were atypical (and thus weighed against her) included the premeditated nature of the act and its apparent brutality – poisoning was considered much more cruel than the more common methods of drowning or smothering. As an older married woman, she was also viewed with less sympathy than younger women who gave birth out of wedlock and killed their babies to avoid social stigma.

== Analysis ==
According to a study of women charged with infanticide between 1829 and 1913, Smith's treatment was unique: the vast majority of women in similar circumstances were found not guilty by reason of insanity, while the few others that were convicted of killing their children were sentenced to death but had their sentences commuted. It has been suggested that the usual insanity defence was unavailable to her given the number of victims.
