= Peter Bower =

Peter Bower (1715/21 – June 1795) was an English clockmaker who settled in Wiltshire during the late 1730s, and established his working career in the village of Redlynch.

== Early life ==
Bower was born between 1715 and 1723 in the borough of Westminster, London, where he was baptised in St Anne's Church, Soho, on 10 November 1723; he was the second eldest son of Peter Bowyer (1691–1794) and his wife Elizabeth (née Williams).

His father began his career as a shipwright, and at the time of his marriage on 25 December 1707 he is recorded as residing in Redriffe (Rotherhithe). His father would eventually establish himself as a clockmaker, and had premises in Great Windmill Street, Soho. He was a grandson of Peter Brent (1634–1676), Sergeant Plumber to King Charles II, and following the Great Fire of London the Plumbers' Company borrowed money from sergeant Peter Brent for the rebuilding of their Plumbers' Hall. He was also the great grandson of William Bowyer (1605–1653), clockmaker of London.

== Marriage and issue ==
Bower was married in Saint Martin's Church, Salisbury, Wiltshire on 23 April 1739 to Susanna Bayly (1717–1787). They were known to have had seven children.

(i) Mary Bower (1739–1827), wife of Henry Plaskett

(ii) James Bower (b. 1743)

(iii) Sarah Bower (b. 1747), wife of William O'bryan

(iv) William Bower (1751–1842), husband of 1st, Anne Smith and 2nd, Ann Northam

(v) Hannah Bower (b. 1753)

(vi) Thermuthis Bower (b. 1756)

(vii) Peter Bower (1759–1784)

Peter Bower's descendants through his daughter Mary Bower, a devout Methodist of Downton, Wiltshire and her husband Henry Plaskett, became established clock and watchmakers in their own right; many of these descendants resided in the East End of London. His son William Bower is also recorded as a clockmaker, although no work by him survives.

== Career ==
Bower is recorded as working as a blacksmith in Salisbury in 1739. He later moved to Hillside House, Redlynch, Wiltshire, where he seems to have lived for the next fifty years or so. The street was later renamed 'Bowers Hill'. Here he established himself as a clockmaker, and many works by him survive today. He seems to have been a devout man, "careful of the morals of his children".

== Death ==
Bower died aged 80 in Redlynch, Wiltshire. He is recorded in the burial register as a pauper, and was buried on 5 July 1795 in the Church of St. Lawrence, Downton.
