= Landford =

Village in Wiltshire, England

Coordinates: 50.968°N 1.635°W

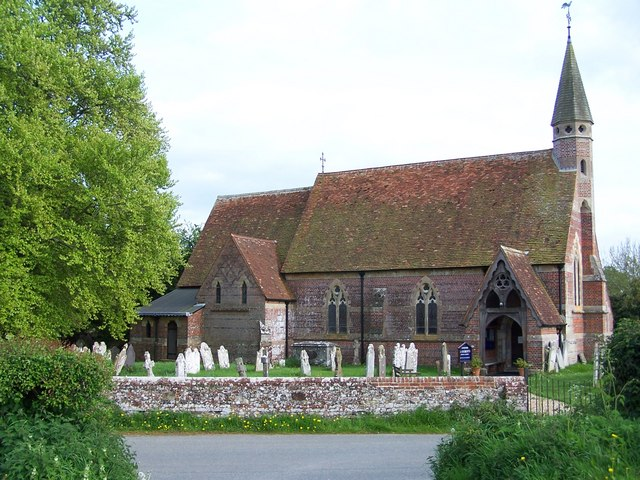
- St Andrew's Church

- Location within Wiltshire
- Population: 1,271 (in 2011)
- OS grid reference: SU257188
- Unitary authority: Wiltshire
- Ceremonial county: Wiltshire
- Region: South West
- Country: England
- Sovereign state: United Kingdom
- Post town: SALISBURY
- Postcode district: SP5
- Dialling code: 01794
- Police: Wiltshire
- Fire: Dorset and Wiltshire
- Ambulance: South Western
- UK Parliament: Salisbury
- Website: Parish Council

Landford is a village and civil parish 10 miles (16 km) southeast of Salisbury in Wiltshire, England. To the south and east of the parish is the county of Hampshire and the New Forest National Park. The parish includes the small village of Nomansland and the hamlets of Hamptworth and Landfordwood.

The River Blackwater crosses the parish from west to east, on its way to join the Test in Hampshire. The A36 Salisbury-Southampton trunk road bisects the parish in the northeast.

== History ==
Evidence of prehistoric activity includes a bell barrow and two bowl barrows from the Bronze Age; and earthworks known as Castle Copse Camp, late Bronze or early Iron Age.

The Domesday Book of 1068 recorded Landford as a settlement in the ancient hundred of Frustfield, with six households and a mill. Woodland in the area continued to be part of the royal forest of Melchet until 1614, when James I granted the forest to Sir Lawrence Hyde.

Plaitford village, just east of Landford, was part of the parish until it was transferred to Hampshire in 1895. A community governance review effective 1 April 2017 transferred the eastern portion of Redlynch parish to Landford. The area transferred includes the settlements of Nomansland and Hamptworth.

== Notable buildings ==
The Church of England parish church of Saint Andrew is Grade II* listed and was built in 1858 to designs by the Gothic Revival architect William Butterfield.

Landford Manor dates from the 17th century and is Grade II* listed.

Wickets Green Farmhouse dates from the 16th century and has connections with the family of Lord Nelson. Landford Wood Mission Hall, a timber building with a tiled roof, was erected in 1899 at the expense of Louisa Baring, Lady Ashburton.

== Notable people ==
Nigel Anderson (1920–2008) inherited the Hamptworth estate in 1952. He was chairman of Wiltshire County Council from 1979 to 1983 and High Sheriff of Wiltshire in 1991.

== Amenities ==
There is a public house, the Landford Poacher, and a village shop and post office, Landford Stores. The village used to have a bakery (closed in 2007), and a farm shop on Glebe Lane (closed in 2024).

The local school is the New Forest Primary School which has two sites: for younger children at Landford and older children at Nomansland. The latter began as a National School of 1867 on Hamptworth common, then in the 20th century the village of Nomansland expanded to surround it.

Nearby Landford Bog and Landford Heath are biological Sites of Special Scientific Interest.
