= Jenner's School =

School building in Cricklade, England

Coordinates: 51.6410°N 1.8576°W

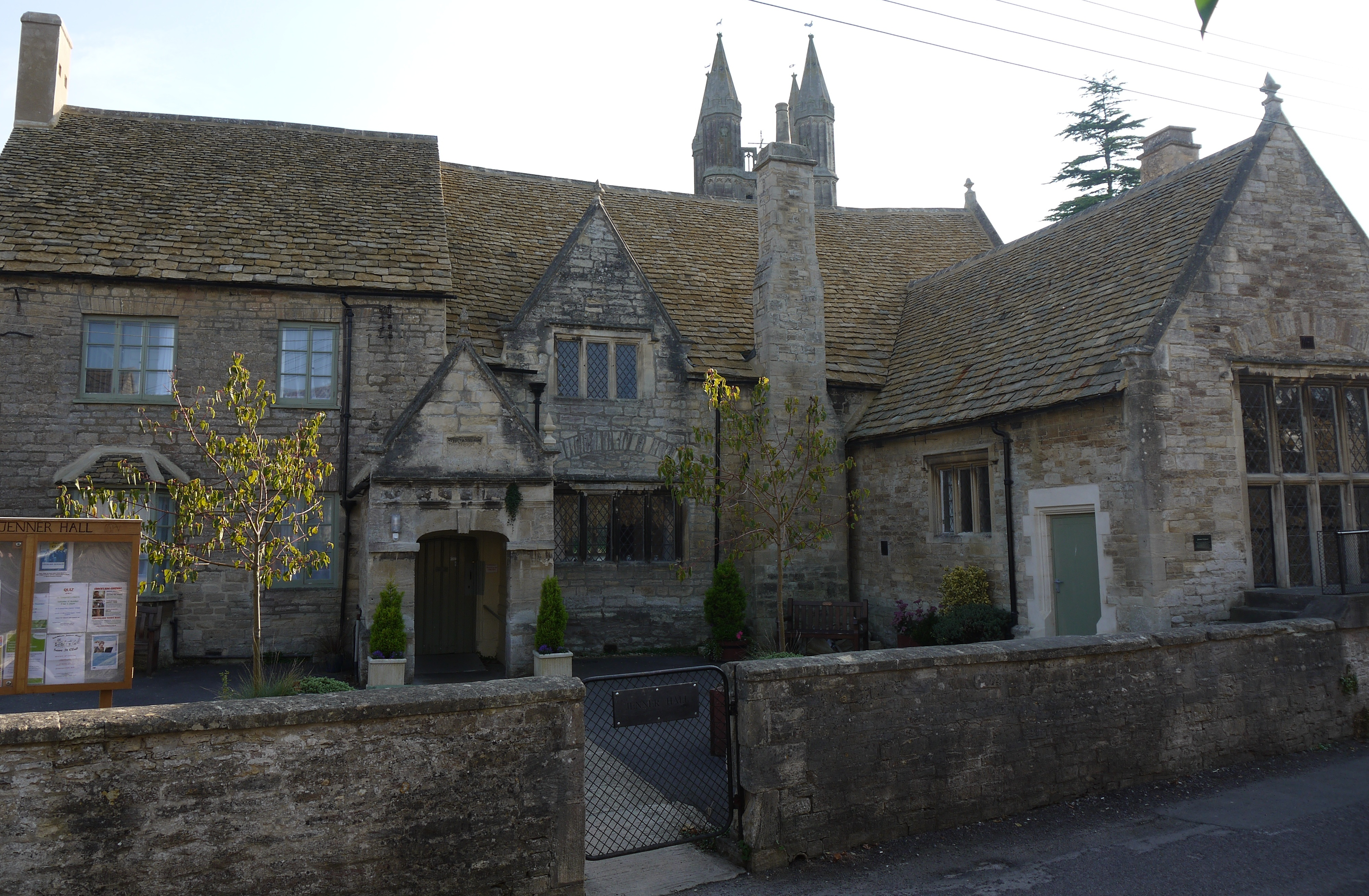
Jenner's School

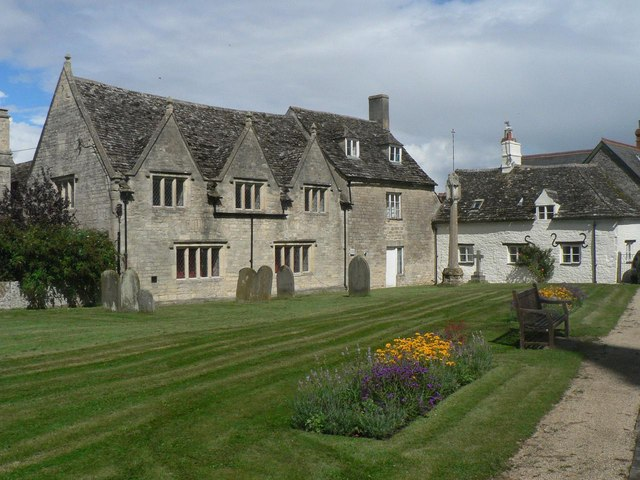
Rear of Jenner's School

Jenner's School is a Grade II* listed former school in Bath Road, Cricklade, Wiltshire, England. It was built in 1652 and then became a workhouse. It became a school again in the 19th century and is now a community hall.

== History ==
The school was built in 1652. It was founded by Robert Jenner (died 1651), a goldsmith of London, and Member of Parliament for Cricklade, by a legacy from his estate which included £20 per year for the schoolmaster. There is a monument to Jenner in the north aisle of the parish church, St Sampson's, which is adjacent to the school. Only boys were admitted and they were taught in Latin, as stipulated in Jenner's will.

The school had closed by c. 1690. From 1719 the building was the parish workhouse, and it was enlarged in 1726–27. In 1840 most of the building was bought for use again as a school, and in 1843 a government building grant was obtained for work to be carried out on the structure. This became St Sampson's National School. National schools were set up in the 19th century by the National Society for Promoting Religious Education. These schools provided elementary education, in accordance with the teaching of the Church of England, to the children of the poor. In 1923 it was changed to an infants' school.

The school closed in 1959. The former schoolroom became the Cricklade parish hall and was renamed the Jenner Hall. It is run by a charity.

== Architecture ==
The two-storey three-bay building is of limestone rubble with ashlar dressings and a stone slate roof. The northern end of the building houses the single-storey schoolroom. The entrance is via a gabled porch on the north side.
