= Landford Manor =

House in Landford, Wiltshire, England

Coordinates: 50°58′49″N 1°37′41″W

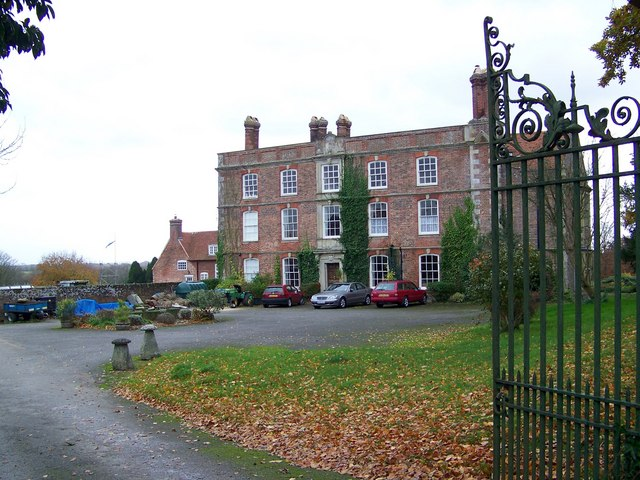
Landford Manor

Landford Manor is a Grade II* listed house in Stock Lane, Landford, Wiltshire, England. It dates from around 1600, the south wing from around 1680, with additions in 1885 and 1929. It is built of English bond brick with limestone quoins and dressings, a tiled roof, and brick chimney stacks. It was originally built for the Stanter family. The Davenant family added the south wing and heightened front around 1680. The Eyres altered the front in 1717. It was owned by the Nelson family, of Trafalgar fame, in the nineteenth century. It was added to by Sir Frederick Preston in the twentieth century.
