= St Sampson's Church, Cricklade =

St Sampson's, Cricklade
- Church of St Sampson
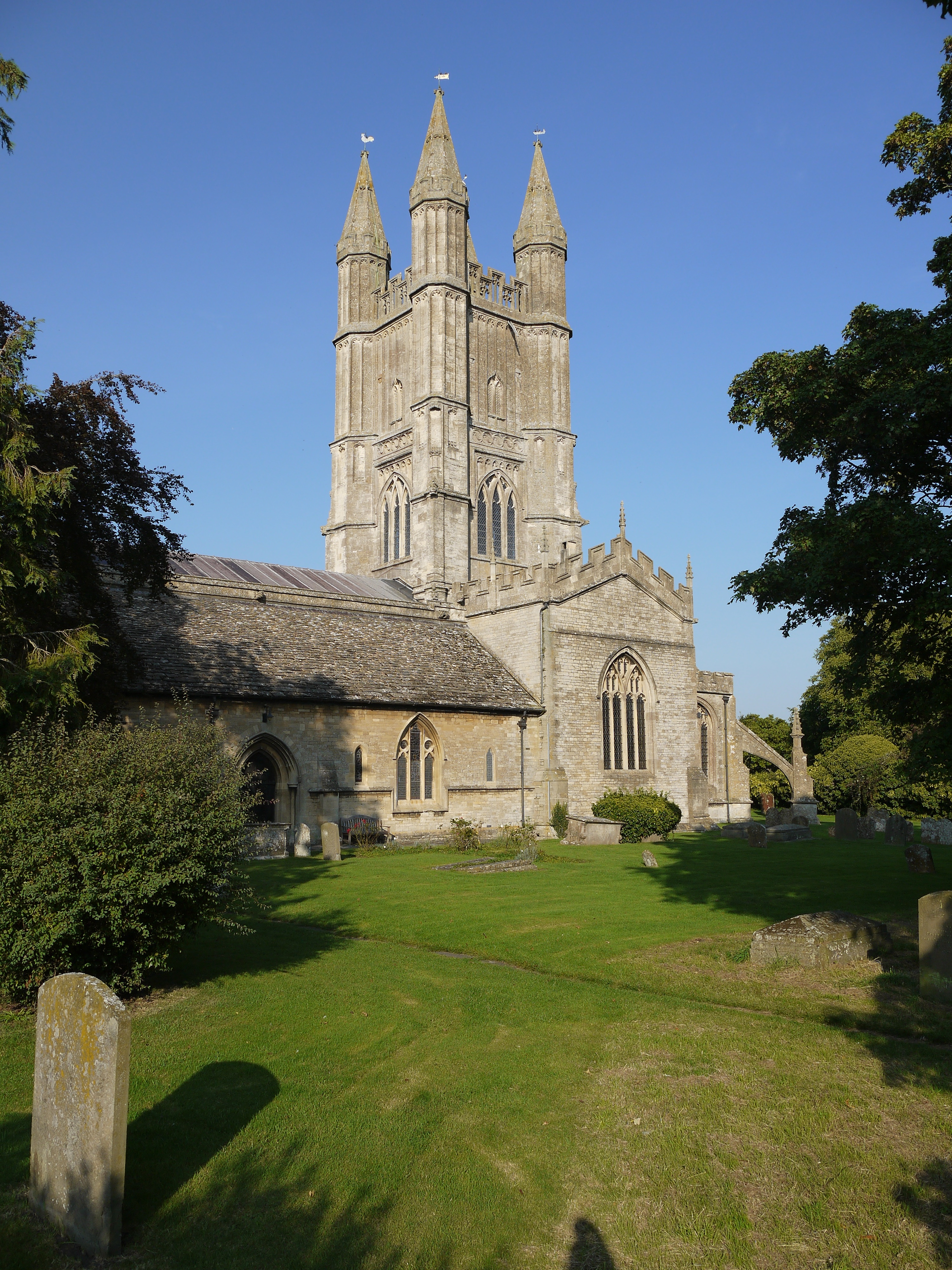

- Location in Wiltshire
- 51.6406°N 1.8580°W
- OS grid reference: SU 09926 93537
- Location: Cricklade, Wiltshire
- Country: England
- Denomination: Anglican
- Website: www.upperthames.org.uk/st-sampsons-cricklade/

History
- Status: Parish church

Architecture
- Functional status: Active
- Years built: Late 12th century, restored 1863–4

Administration
- Province: Canterbury
- Diocese: Bristol
- Archdeaconry: Malmesbury
- Deanery: North Wiltshire
- Parish: Cricklade

Listed Building – Grade I
- Reference no.: 1023081

St Sampson's is the Church of England parish church of the town of Cricklade, Wiltshire, England. A large aisled church with a central tower, the present building dates from the late 12th century but has fragments of Anglo-Saxon work. The church is a Grade I listed building.

The dedication is to Saint Samson of Dol, born in Wales in the late 5th century, who was one of the founders of Christianity in Brittany.

== History and architecture ==
A stone church was mentioned as standing on this site in c. 973. The 1086 Domesday Book recorded the church, on land held by Westminster Abbey.

Small amounts of Anglo-Saxon stonework survive in the present building, in particular in the south wall of the nave. The north arcade was added in the late 12th century, while the south arcade is from a remodelling in the 13th. The chancel is 13th century, remodelled in the 14th and 15th. To the north is the Hungerford chapel, probably built for Sir Edmund Hungerford (d. 1484).

The tower was begun in the early 16th century and completed in the 1550s at the expense of the Duke of Northumberland and the Hungerford family. Nikolaus Pevsner wrote: "The distinguishing feature of the church is its proud and self-certain, somewhat heavy and certainly not elegant, crossing tower", while Simon Jenkins describes it in England's Thousand Best Churches as "massive rather than graceful".

The owners of Widhill manor (a tithing south of the town, later transferred to Blunsdon parish) claimed sole use of the north aisle. From 1624 this was the Jenner family, following the purchase of the manor by Robert Jenner (c.1584–1651), a North Wiltshire man who had prospered as a silver merchant in the City of London. His chest tomb, in limestone with a black marble top, is in the north aisle; his charitable bequests included money to build Jenner's School, next to the churchyard.

Restoration in 1863–4 was by Ewan Christian. Stained glass in the west window is by Kempe, 1888. In 1930 Martin Travers designed two windows and the decoration of the two altars. The church was designated as Grade I listed in 1955.

== Crosses in churchyard ==
A broken shaft of a medieval limestone cross, on a crude octagonal base, can be seen against the gable of a gatehouse at the northern perimeter of the churchyard.

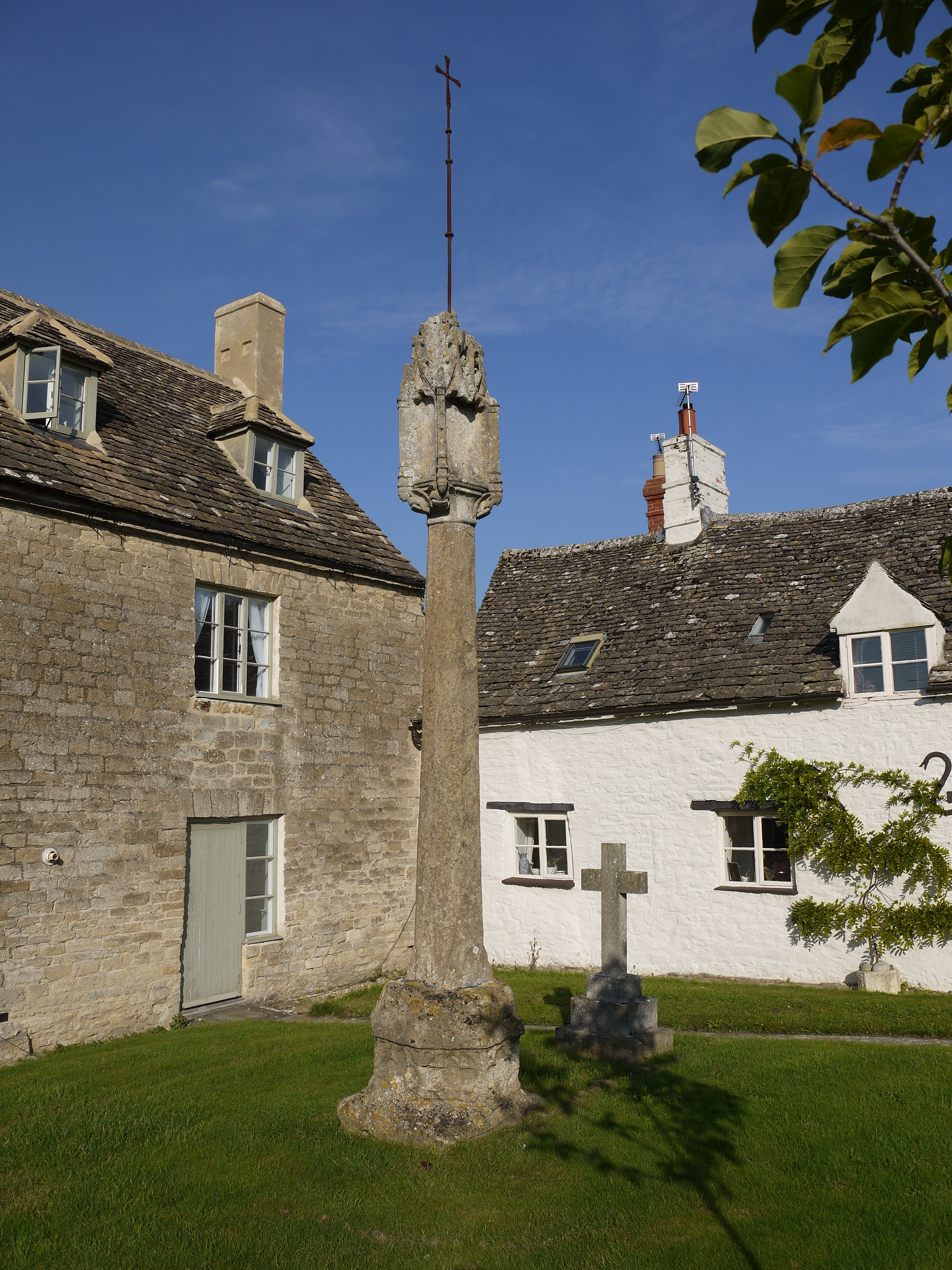
Town Cross, St Sampson's churchyard

A 14th-century limestone cross stands in the northeast of the churchyard, complete with a carved head. This was the town cross which stood at the High Street crossroads until c. 1817-20 when the town hall was demolished. It is a Grade II* listed structure.

== Parish ==
Until 1952, Cricklade's two churches – St Sampson's and St Mary's – had separate parishes. A united parish of Cricklade was created, and at the same time the benefice became 'The United Benefice of Cricklade with Latton' which included St John the Baptist at Latton and the redundant St Mary's at Eysey, near Latton (demolished 1953).

In 1981 St Mary's was declared redundant, making St Sampson's the sole church of the parish. Since 2007 the parishes have formed part of the Upper Thames Group, together with Holy Cross at Ashton Keynes, All Saints at Leigh, and St John at Latton.
