= Nomansland, Wiltshire =

Village in Wiltshire, England

Coordinates: 50.955°N 1.641°W

Nomansland
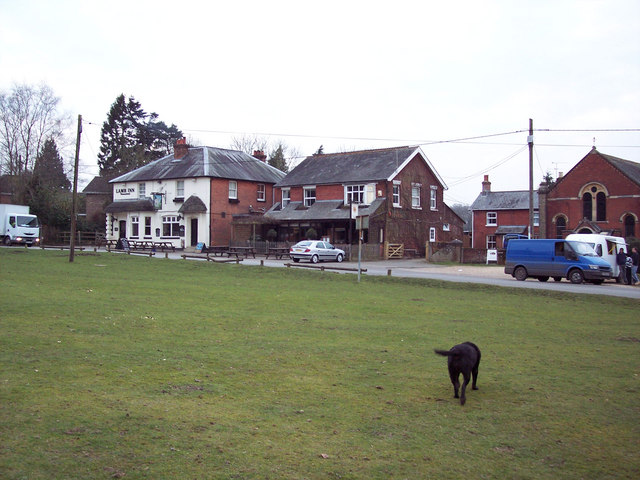
- Nomansland village green showing the Lamb Inn pub and the Methodist Chapel

- Location within Wiltshire
- OS grid reference: SU253173
- Civil parish: Landford
- Unitary authority: Wiltshire
- Ceremonial county: Wiltshire
- Region: South West
- Country: England
- Sovereign state: United Kingdom
- Post town: Salisbury
- Postcode district: SP5
- Dialling code: 01794
- Police: Wiltshire
- Fire: Dorset and Wiltshire
- Ambulance: South Western
- UK Parliament: Salisbury

Nomansland is a small village in the civil parish of Landford, in Wiltshire, England, close to the county border with Hampshire. It lies about 3.5 miles (6 km) southeast of Redlynch and 10 miles (16 km) southeast of the city of Salisbury. The village is within the boundaries of the New Forest National Park and is close to Pipers Wait, the highest point in the New Forest.

In the early 19th century the settlement was a hamlet, no more than a group of cottages on common land. At first part of Downton parish, by 1841 Nomansland had been excluded from the parish and was deemed an extra-parochial place. In 1866 it became a separate civil parish, until on 1 April 1934 the parish was abolished and merged with Redlynch. In 1931 the parish had a population of 125. More houses were built in the later 19th century and the 20th century. A community governance review effective 1 April 2017 transferred the eastern portion of Redlynch parish, including Nomansland, to Landford.

The local school is the New Forest Primary School which has two sites: for younger children at Landford and older children at Nomansland. The latter began as a National School of 1867 on Hamptworth common, then in the 20th century the village of Nomansland expanded to surround it.

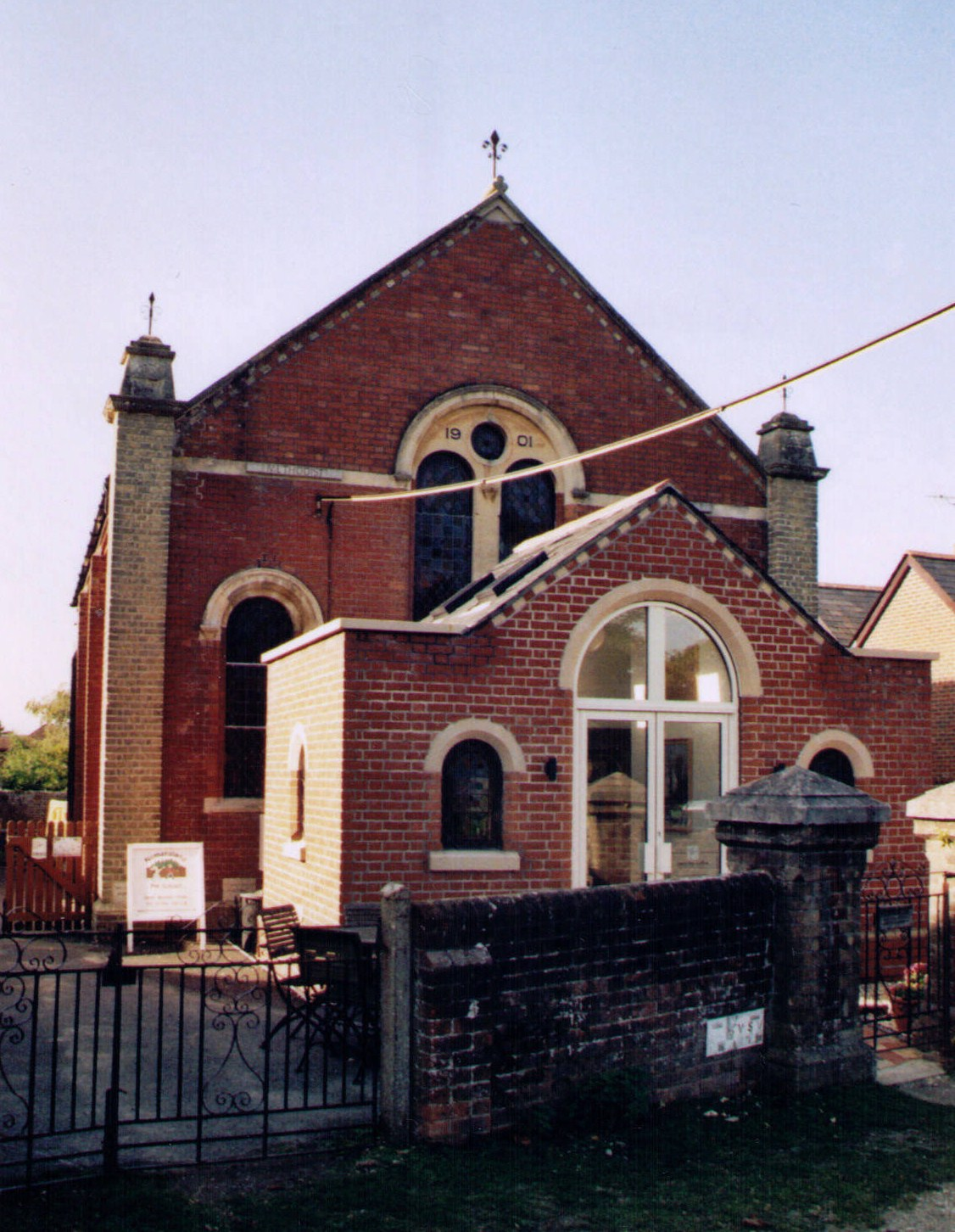
Nomansland Methodist Chapel

A Primitive Methodist chapel was built in the mid-19th century and replaced by a new building on the green in 1901. This became Nomansland Methodist Chapel and was still in use in 2015.

The village has a pub, the Lamb Inn, and a French restaurant, Les Mirabelles.
