= Redlynch, Wiltshire =

Village in Wiltshire, England

Coordinates: 50.988°N 1.712°W

Redlynch
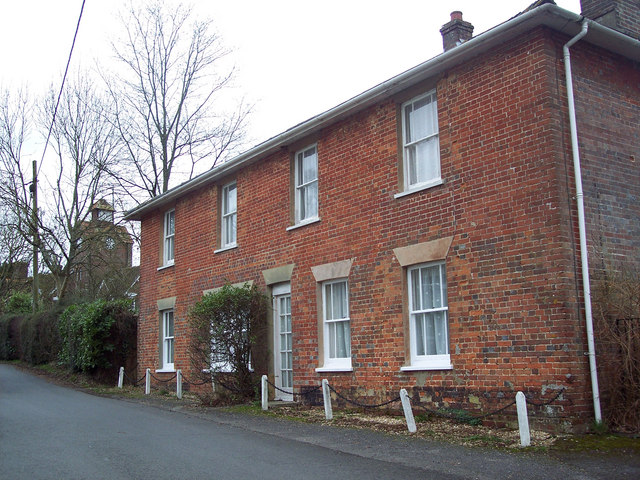
- Red House, Morgan's Vale Road

- Location within Wiltshire
- Population: 2,782 (2021 census)
- OS grid reference: SU203210
- Civil parish: Redlynch
- Unitary authority: Wiltshire
- Ceremonial county: Wiltshire
- Region: South West
- Country: England
- Sovereign state: United Kingdom
- Post town: Salisbury
- Postcode district: SP5
- Dialling code: 01725
- Police: Wiltshire
- Fire: Dorset and Wiltshire
- Ambulance: South Western
- UK Parliament: Salisbury
- Website: Parish Council

Redlynch is a village and civil parish about 6.5 miles (10.5 km) southeast of Salisbury in Wiltshire, England. The parish includes the villages of Morgan's Vale and Woodfalls immediately west and southwest of Redlynch; the village of Lover, 1 mile (1.6 km) southeast of Redlynch; and the hamlet of Bohemia, south of Lover. Much of the parish lies within the boundaries of the New Forest National Park.

The River Blackwater rises near Lover and flows east through the parish towards Landford and Hampshire, where it joins the Test.

== History ==
The earliest settlement was at Pensworth, north of Grove Copse and northwest of the present Redlynch, in the 12th or 13th century. This village had declined by the 15th century and in the 20th century the name survived only as Upper Pensworth Farm.

In the 18th century settlement was along roads and the edges of commons. Settlement increased in the 19th century, at Redlynch and at Warminster Green (called Lover since 1876) where the church and school were built.

Redlynch was home to the clockmaker Peter Bower (1715/21 – 1795) who resided close to the site now known as Bowers Hill.

== Religious sites ==
Redlynch parish church of Saint Mary at Lover is a yellow brick building dating from 1837. Originally part of Downton parish, a separate ecclesiastical district was created for the church in 1841. The vicarage was the childhood home of Bernard Walke who served as an Anglican priest in three Cornish parishes.

The Church of St Birinus at Morgan's Vale was built as a chapel of ease to Downton in 1894–96. It is a red brick Gothic Revival building with stone dressings and Perpendicular Gothic style windows. It was designed by the Gothic Revival architect C. E. Ponting of Marlborough in the style of his architectural contemporary W. D. Caroe. The church gained its own parish in 1915. The benefices of the two Redlynch churches were combined in 1968; as of 2016 the incumbent resides at Downton.

Woodfalls Methodist Church was built in 1874 by the Primitive Methodists and joined the Salisbury Methodist Circuit in the 1940s.

== Notable buildings ==
Redlynch House, built by John Bailey (d. pre-1822), was acquired at some time before 1833, with its 25-acre park, by Rev. William Nelson, 1st Earl Nelson (1757–1835) (elder brother and heir of Admiral Horatio Nelson) of nearby Trafalgar Park, Wiltshire, as a residence for his son-in-law Samuel Hood, 2nd Baron Bridport, also of Cricket House, Cricket St Thomas in Somerset.

Newhouse, east of Redlynch on the road towards Whiteparish, was built c. 1619. The house and estate were bought in 1633 by Giles Eyre (father of Sir Giles Eyre, member of Parliament and judge) and continue to be held by his descendants. The house is constructed from English bonded brick with limestone dressings and has a distinctive Y-shaped plan; it was designated as Grade I listed in 1960. There is an early 18th-century granary and two stable blocks, from 1750 and the late 19th. In 2021, the Newhouse Estate was offered for sale with an asking price of £18 million.

== Governance ==
The civil parish elects a parish council. It is in the area of Wiltshire Council unitary authority, which performs most significant local government functions. The parishes of Redlynch and Landford form the Redlynch & Landford electoral district, which elects one member of Wiltshire Council.

Redlynch was formerly part of Downton parish. It became a separate civil parish in 1896, which in 1901 had 310 houses. The parish was enlarged in 1934 by absorbing Morgan's Vale and Woodfalls parish (which had been separated from Downton in 1923, and had a population of 630 in 1931), and Nomansland parish. A community governance review effective 1 April 2017 transferred the eastern portion of Redlynch parish to Landford; the area transferred included the settlements of Nomansland and Hamptworth.

== Amenities ==
Morgan's Vale and Woodfalls CE Primary School serves Morgan's Vale, Woodfalls, Lover and Redlynch; it was built as a National School in 1869, next to St Birinus' church.

Redlynch Village Hall is near the church at Lover. Built in 1922 as the church hall, it was modernised in the early 21st century. The parish has two pubs: the Kings Head at Redlynch and the Woodfalls Inn at Woodfalls.

== Sources ==
- Pevsner, Nikolaus; Cherry, Bridget (revision) (1975) [1963]. The Buildings of England: Wiltshire. Harmondsworth: Penguin Books. p. 381.
