= King John's House, Tollard Royal =

Historic house in Wiltshire, England

Coordinates: 50°57′30″N 2°04′51″W

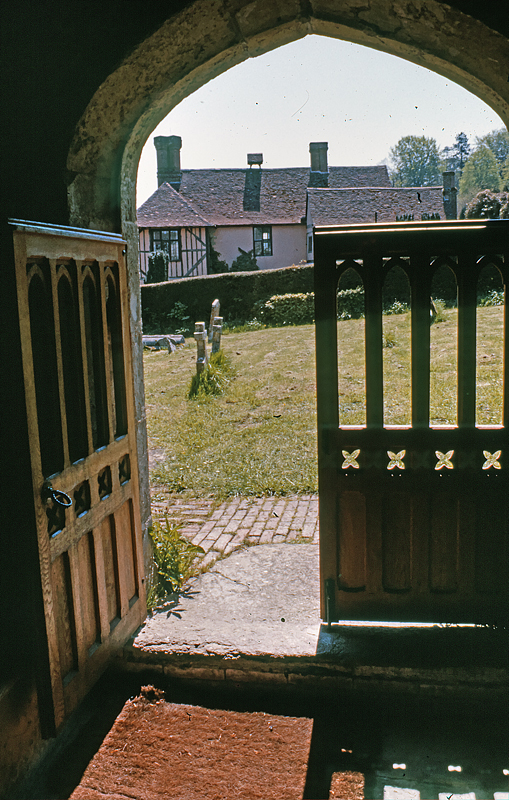
King John's House, Tollard Royal, from the church porch

King John's House is a former manor house in the south Wiltshire village of Tollard Royal, England. Just south of the church, the building has at its core a 13th-century hall house. Remodelling in the 16th and 17th centuries added wings, in part timber-framed. By 1811, it was described as a farmhouse. Augustus Pitt Rivers restored and extended the house, and opened it to the public around 1890 as a museum to display the finds from his excavations on Cranborne Chase, but by 1907 it was again a residence. Architectural historian Sir Nikolaus Pevsner describes the house as "memorable".

The house was designated as Grade II* when it was listed in 1966. It lies within and is owned by the Rushmore Estate, which today operates it as a holiday let and a base for events such as weddings.
