= List of Sites of Special Scientific Interest in Wiltshire =

Protected land in England

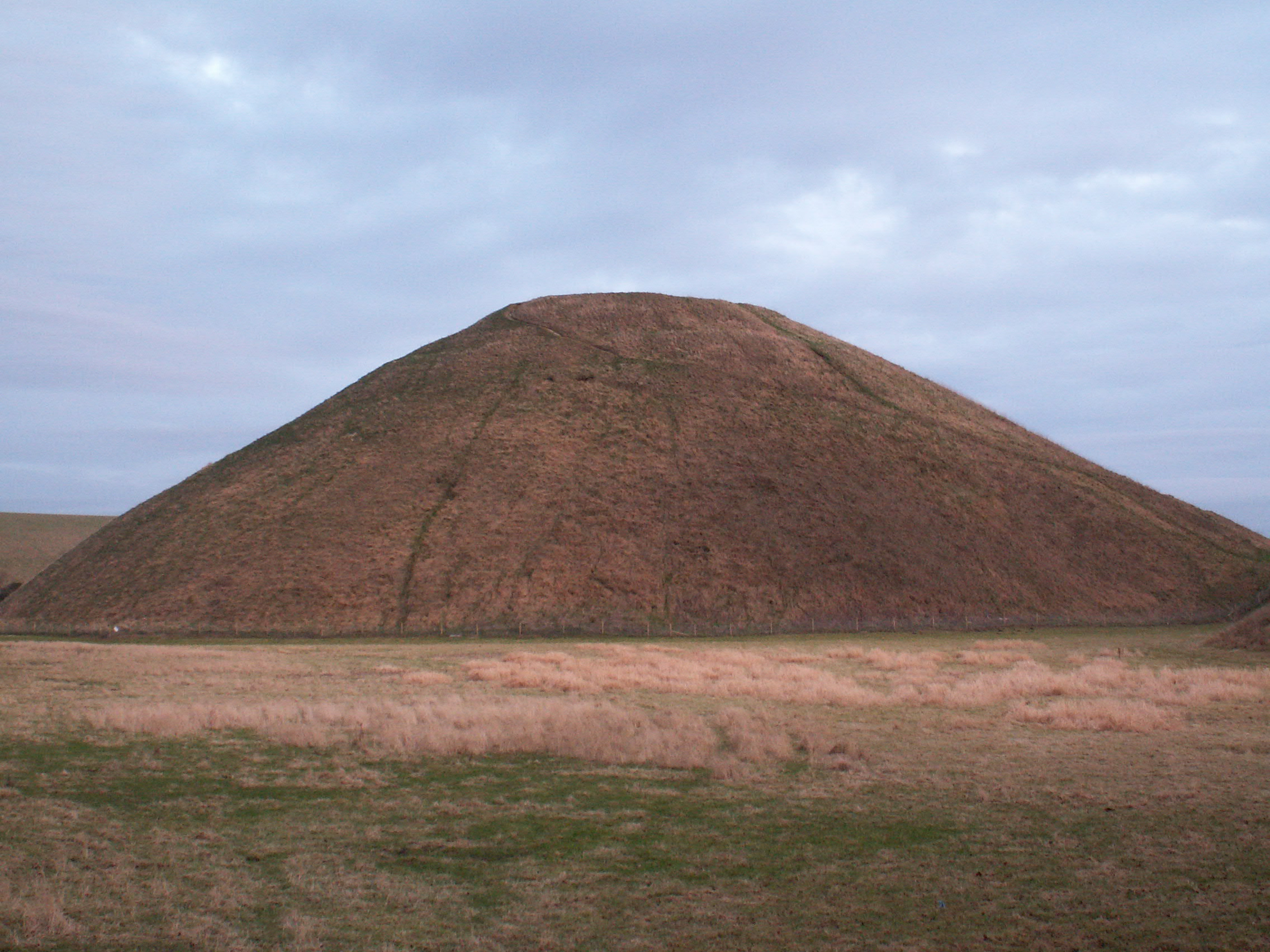
Silbury Hill, one of the many SSSIs in Wiltshire designated for their grassland plant communities.

The following is a list of Sites of Special Scientific Interest (SSSIs) in Wiltshire, England, United Kingdom. In England the body responsible for designating SSSIs is Natural England, which chooses a site because of its fauna, flora, geological or physiographical features. As of 2006, there are 134 sites designated in this Area of Search, of which the vast majority, 108, have been designated due to their biological interest, with just 21 due to their geological interest (and 5 for both).

Natural England took over the role of designating and managing SSSIs from English Nature in October 2006 when it was formed from the amalgamation of English Nature, parts of the Countryside Agency and the Rural Development Service. Natural England, like its predecessor, uses the 1974–1996 county system and as such the same approach is followed here, rather than adopting the current local government or ceremonial county boundaries. The data in the table is taken from English Nature's website in the form of citation sheets for each SSSI.

For other counties, see List of SSSIs by Area of Search.

== Sites ==
| Site name | Reason for designation | | Area^{[A]} | | Grid reference^{[B]} | Year in which notified | Map^{[C]} |
| Site name | Biological interest | Geological interest | Hectares | Acres | Grid reference^{[B]} | Year in which notified | Map^{[C]} |
|---|---|---|---|---|---|---|---|
| Acres Farm Meadow | ✓ | | 4.2 | 10.4 | SU024927 | 1989 | Map |
| River Avon System | ✓ | | 507.8 | 1,254.8 | SU073583 | 1996 | Map |
| Baverstock Juniper Bank | ✓ | | 2.6 | 6.4 | SU035336 | 1971 | Map |
| Bencroft Hill Meadows | ✓ | | 5.1 | 12.6 | SU962732 | 1988 | Map |
| Bentley Wood | ✓ | | 665.0 | 1,643.0 | SU250295 | 1985 | Map |
| Bincknoll Dip Woods | ✓ | | 5.7 | 14.0 | SU111796 | 1971 | Map |
| Blackmoor Copse | ✓ | | 31.3 | 77.2 | SU234292 | 1971 | Map |
| Botley Down | ✓ | | 12.7 | 31.4 | SU292598 | 1989 | Map |
| Bowerchalke Downs | ✓ | | 128.6 | 317.7 | SU004218 | 1971 | Map |
| Box Mine | ✓ | | 56.6 | 139.8 | ST838690 | 1991 | Map |
| Bracknell Croft | ✓ | | 4.8 | 11.8 | SU180330 | 1971 | Map |
| Bradley Woods | ✓ | | 48.7 | 120.3 | ST789410 | 1986 | Map |
| Bratton Downs | ✓ | ✓ | 395.8 | 978.0 | ST925522 | 1971 | Map |
| Brickworth Down and Dean Hill | ✓ | | 118.6 | 293.9 | SU246259 | 1951 | Map |
| Brimsdown Hill | ✓ | | 193.7 | 478.6 | ST821391 | 1951 | Map |
| Britford Water Meadows | ✓ | | 18.2 | 45.0 | SU166274 | 1975 | Map |
| Burcombe Down | ✓ | | 47.1 | 116.4 | SU064295 | 1971 | Map |
| Burderop Wood | ✓ | | 48.5 | 119.8 | SU165810 | 1971 | Map |
| Calstone and Cherhill Downs | ✓ | | 128.6 | 317.9 | SU047692 | 1971 | Map |
| Camp Down | ✓ | | 7.3 | 18.2 | SU120338 | 1965 | Map |
| Charnage Down Chalk Pit | | ✓ | 3.7 | 9.1 | ST837329 | 1971 | Map |
| Chickengrove Bottom | ✓ | | 9.8 | 24.3 | SU040216 | 1975 | Map |
| Chilmark Quarries | ✓ | ✓ | 9.7 | 23.9 | ST974312 | 1977 | Map |
| Chilton Foliat Meadows | ✓ | | 54.6 | 134.9 | SU315703 | 1971 | Map |
| Clattinger Farm | ✓ | | 60.3 | 149.0 | SU012933 | 1971 | Map |
| Clearbury Down | ✓ | | 31.3 | 77.3 | SU152240 | 1971 | Map |
| Cley Hill | ✓ | | 26.6 | 65.7 | ST838449 | 1975 | Map |
| Cloatley Manor Farm Meadows | ✓ | | 12.1 | 29.9 | ST981910 | 1997 | Map |
| Clout's Wood | ✓ | | 11.8 | 29.1 | SU137796 | 1951 | Map |
| Coate Water | ✓ | | 51.1 | 126.4 | SU188820 | 1971 | Map |
| Cockey Down | ✓ | | 15.2 | 37.6 | SU170317 | 1971 | Map |
| Colerne Park and Monk's Wood | ✓ | | 53.7 | 132.6 | ST838725 | 1951 | Map |
| The Coombes, Hinton Parva | ✓ | | 15.9 | 39.2 | SU228826 | 1989 | Map |
| Corsham Railway Cutting | | ✓ | 6.6 | 16.4 | ST862695 | 1971 | Map |
| Cotswold Water Park | ✓ | | 135.0 | 337 | SU100960 | 1994 | Map |
| Cranborne Chase | ✓ | | 451.4 | 1,115.4 | ST970180 | 1975 | Map |
| Dank's Down and Truckle Hill | ✓ | | 13.1 | 32.4 | ST834758 | 1990 | Map |
| Dead Maid Quarry | | ✓ | 0.4 | 1.1 | ST803324 | 1951 | Map |
| Dinton Quarry | | ✓ | 0.3 | 0.7 | SU006308 | 1990 | Map |
| Dinton Railway Cutting | | ✓ | 0.3 | 0.7 | SU008309 | 1990 | Map |
| Distillery Farm Meadows | ✓ | | 18.7 | 46.2 | SU032898 | 1988 | Map |
| East Harnham Meadows | ✓ | | 17.3 | 42.7 | SU151289 | 1995 | Map |
| Ebsbury Down | ✓ | | 53.4 | 132.0 | SU054352 | 1975 | Map |
| Emmett Hill Meadows | ✓ | | 5.1 | 12.6 | SU009901 | 1987 | Map |
| Figsbury Ring | ✓ | | 11.2 | 27.7 | SU188338 | 1975 | Map |
| Fonthill Grottoes | ✓ | | 0.7 | 1.7 | ST935315 | 1994 | Map |
| Fyfield Down | ✓ | ✓ | 325.3 | 803.8 | SU136709 | 1951 | Map |
| Gallows Hill | ✓ | | 27.8 | 68.7 | ST952244 | 1965 | Map |
| Goldborough Farm Meadows | ✓ | | 10.3 | 25.5 | SU086800 | | Map |
| Great Cheverell Hill | ✓ | | 33.2 | 82.1 | ST966520 | 1971 | Map |
| Great Quarry, Swindon | | ✓ | 1.0 | 2.5 | SU151836 | 1951 | Map |
| Great Yews | ✓ | | 29.3 | 72.3 | SU120231 | 1951 | Map |
| Gripwood Quarry | | ✓ | 2.9 | 7.0 | ST822603 | 1951 | Map |
| Gutch Common | ✓ | | 35.1 | 86.8 | ST896259 | 1951 | Map |
| Ham Hill | ✓ | | 1.5 | 3.8 | SU333617 | 1971 | Map |
| Hang Wood | ✓ | | 20.3 | 50.2 | ST861319 | 1986 | Map |
| Harries Ground, Rodbourne | ✓ | | 6.9 | 17.0 | ST930823 | 2003 | Map |
| Haydon Meadow | ✓ | | 6.4 | 15.8 | SU120890 | 1999 | Map |
| Heath Hill Farm | ✓ | | 20.7 | 51.2 | ST757336 | 1997 | Map |
| Homington and Coombe Bissett Downs | ✓ | | 25.0 | 61.8 | SU104245 | 1971 | Map |
| Honeybrook Farm | ✓ | | 42.4 | 104.8 | ST841730 | 1992 | Map |
| Inwood, Warleigh | ✓ | | 56.9 | 140.5 | ST800633 | 1988 | Map |
| Jones's Mill | ✓ | | 11.6 | 28.7 | SU168613 | 1975 | Map |
| Kellaways – West Tytherton, River Avon | | ✓ | 4.1 | 10.1 | ST945750 | 1998 | Map |
| River Kennet | ✓ | | 112.7 | 278.5 | SU203692 | 1995 | Map |
| Kennet and Lambourn Floodplain | ✓ | | 22.9 | 56.9 | SU316705 | 1996 | Map |
| King's Play Hill | ✓ | | 29.5 | 72.9 | SU006658 | 1971 | Map |
| Knapp and Barnett's Downs | ✓ | | 71.4 | 176.4 | SU030266 | 1971 | Map |
| Knighton Downs and Wood | ✓ | | 203.7 | 503.5 | SU048237 | 1971 | Map |
| Lady Down Quarry | | ✓ | 0.2 | 0.6 | ST961307 | 1990 | Map |
| Landford Bog | ✓ | | 11.6 | 28.7 | SU259185 | 1987 | Map |
| Landford Heath | ✓ | | 11.8 | 29.0 | SU265178 | 1994 | Map |
| Langley Wood and Homan's Copse | ✓ | | 219.3 | 541.9 | SU230206 | 1985 | Map |
| Little Grubbins Meadow | ✓ | | 3.0 | 7.3 | ST831773 | 1975 | Map |
| Long Knoll | ✓ | | 34.2 | 84.5 | ST794376 | 1971 | Map |
| Loosehanger Copse and Meadows | ✓ | | 56.3 | 139.0 | SU215195 | 1992 | Map |
| Lower Coombe and Ferne Brook Meadows | ✓ | | 11.3 | 28.0 | ST916236 | 2002 | Map |
| Lower Woodford Water Meadows | ✓ | | 23.9 | 58.9 | SU124347 | 1971 | Map |
| Midford Valley Woods | ✓ | | 24.6 | 60.8 | ST769611 | 1975 | Map |
| Morgan's Hill | ✓ | | 12.6 | 31.1 | SU028672 | 1951 | Map |
| The New Forest | ✓ | ✓ | 28,947.4 | 71,529.0 | SU298081 | 1959 | Map |
| North Meadow, Cricklade | ✓ | | 24.6 | 109.7 | SU094946 | 1971 | Map |
| Odstock Down | ✓ | | 12.1 | 29.9 | SU139250 | 1975 | Map |
| Okus Quarry | | ✓ | 0.3 | 0.6 | SU147836 | 1951 | Map |
| Old Town Railway Cutting, Swindon | | ✓ | 1.8 | 4.4 | SU153832 | 1975 | Map |
| Out Woods | ✓ | | 14.3 | 35.4 | ST833763 | 1975 | Map |
| Parsonage Down | ✓ | | 188.6 | 466.1 | SU050412 | 1971 | Map |
| Pewsey Downs | ✓ | | 305.3 | 754.4 | SU113636 | 1951 | Map |
| Picket and Clanger Wood | ✓ | | 66.4 | 164.1 | ST975543 | 1989 | Map |
| Piggledene | ✓ | ✓ | 4.7 | 11.6 | SU141689 | 1965 | Map |
| Pike Corner | ✓ | | 15.2 | 37.6 | SU036934 | 1986 | Map |
| Pincombe Down | ✓ | | 23.8 | 58.8 | ST966217 | 1971 | Map |
| Porton Down | ✓ | | 1,561.8 | 3,859.4 | SU240365 | 1977 | Map |
| Porton Meadows | ✓ | | 17.6 | 43.6 | SU185362 | 1988 | Map |
| Prescombe Down | ✓ | | 76.2 | 188.3 | ST985255 | 1951 | Map |
| Rack Hill | ✓ | | 10.6 | 26.1 | ST842762 | 1975 | Map |
| Ravensroost Wood | ✓ | | 43.7 | 107.9 | SU022882 | 1989 | Map |
| Restrop Farm and Brockhurst Wood | ✓ | | 56.5 | 139.6 | SU073866 | 1992 | Map |
| Rotherley Downs | ✓ | | 120.1 | 296.6 | ST946196 | 1989 | Map |
| Roundway Down and Covert | ✓ | | 86.0 | 212.5 | SU000646 | 1971 | Map |
| Salisbury Plain | ✓ | | 19,689.9 | 48,655.7 | SU070500 | 1975 | Map |
| Savernake Forest | ✓ | | 904.7 | 2,235.6 | SU215665 | 1971 | Map |
| Scratchbury and Cotley Hills | ✓ | | 53.5 | 132.2 | ST915437 | 1951 | Map |
| Seend Cleeve Quarry | | ✓ | 3.0 | 7.4 | ST933609 | 1987 | Map |
| Seend Ironstone Quarry and Road Cutting | | ✓ | 1.2 | 2.9 | ST937610 | 1965 | Map |
| Silbury Hill | ✓ | | 2.3 | 5.6 | SU100685 | 1965 | Map |
| Spye Park | ✓ | | 90.3 | 223.1 | ST952674 | 1951 | Map |
| Stanton St. Quintin Quarry and Motorway Cutting | | ✓ | 2.2 | 5.4 | ST918796 | 1971 | Map |
| Starveall and Stony Down | ✓ | | 22.5 | 55.7 | ST991400 | 1971 | Map |
| Steeple Ashton | | ✓ | 26.5 | 65.6 | ST914558 | 1998 | Map |
| Steeple Langford Down | ✓ | | 21.8 | 53.7 | SU036387 | 1971 | Map |
| Stert Brook Exposure | | ✓ | 0.4 | 1.0 | SU017583 | 1989 | Map |
| Stockton Wood and Down | ✓ | | 61.5 | 151.8 | ST958366 | 1951 | Map |
| Stoke Common Meadows | ✓ | | 10.2 | 25.1 | SU064904 | 1994 | Map |
| Stratford Toney Down | ✓ | | 23.1 | 57.2 | SU095246 | 1987 | Map |
| Sutton Lane Meadows | ✓ | | 3.4 | 8.5 | ST946777 | 1988 | Map |
| Teffont Evias Quarry / Lane Cutting | | ✓ | 3.6 | 8.9 | ST990310 | 1989 | Map |
| Throope Down | ✓ | | 34.4 | 97.4 | SU084246 | 1971 | Map |
| River Till | ✓ | | 32.1 | 79.2 | SU051452 | 2000 | Map |
| Tytherington Down | ✓ | | 5.9 | 14.6 | ST912385 | 1975 | Map |
| Upper Chicksgrove Quarry | | ✓ | 5.6 | 13.8 | ST962296 | 1971 | Map |
| Upper Waterhay Meadow | ✓ | | 2.8 | 6.8 | SU068937 | 1971 | Map |
| Upton Cow Down | ✓ | | 16.4 | 40.5 | ST875491 | 1989 | Map |
| West Harnham Chalk Pit | | ✓ | 2.8 | 6.9 | SU128287 | 1971 | Map |
| West Yatton Down | ✓ | | 14.4 | 36.0 | ST852760 | 1971 | Map |
| Westbury Ironstone Quarry | | ✓ | 0.6 | 1.4 | ST853508 | 1965 | Map |
| Whiteparish Common | ✓ | | 64.5 | 159.4 | SU255233 | 1965 | Map |
| Whitesheet Hill | ✓ | | 136.1 | 336.3 | ST804346 | 1965 | Map |
| Win Green Down | ✓ | | 26.0 | 64.3 | ST927209 | 1971 | Map |
| Winklebury Hill | ✓ | | 63.0 | 155.5 | ST952216 | 1971 | Map |
| Winsley Mines | ✓ | | 1.5 | 3.7 | ST795607 | 1989 | Map |
| Wootton Bassett Mud Spring | | ✓ | 0.8 | 2.0 | SU078815 | 1997 | Map |
| Wylye and Church Dean Downs | ✓ | | 80.9 | 200.0 | SU002361 | 1951 | Map |
| Yarnbury Castle | ✓ | | 9.1 | 22.5 | SU037403 | 1951 | Map |

== Notes ==
^{A} Data rounded to one decimal place.
^{B} Grid reference is based on the British national grid reference system, also known as OSGB36, and is the system used by the Ordnance Survey.
^{C} Link to maps using the MAGIC map service provided by Defra.
