= Seend Locks =

Coordinates: 51.35074°N 2.09759°W

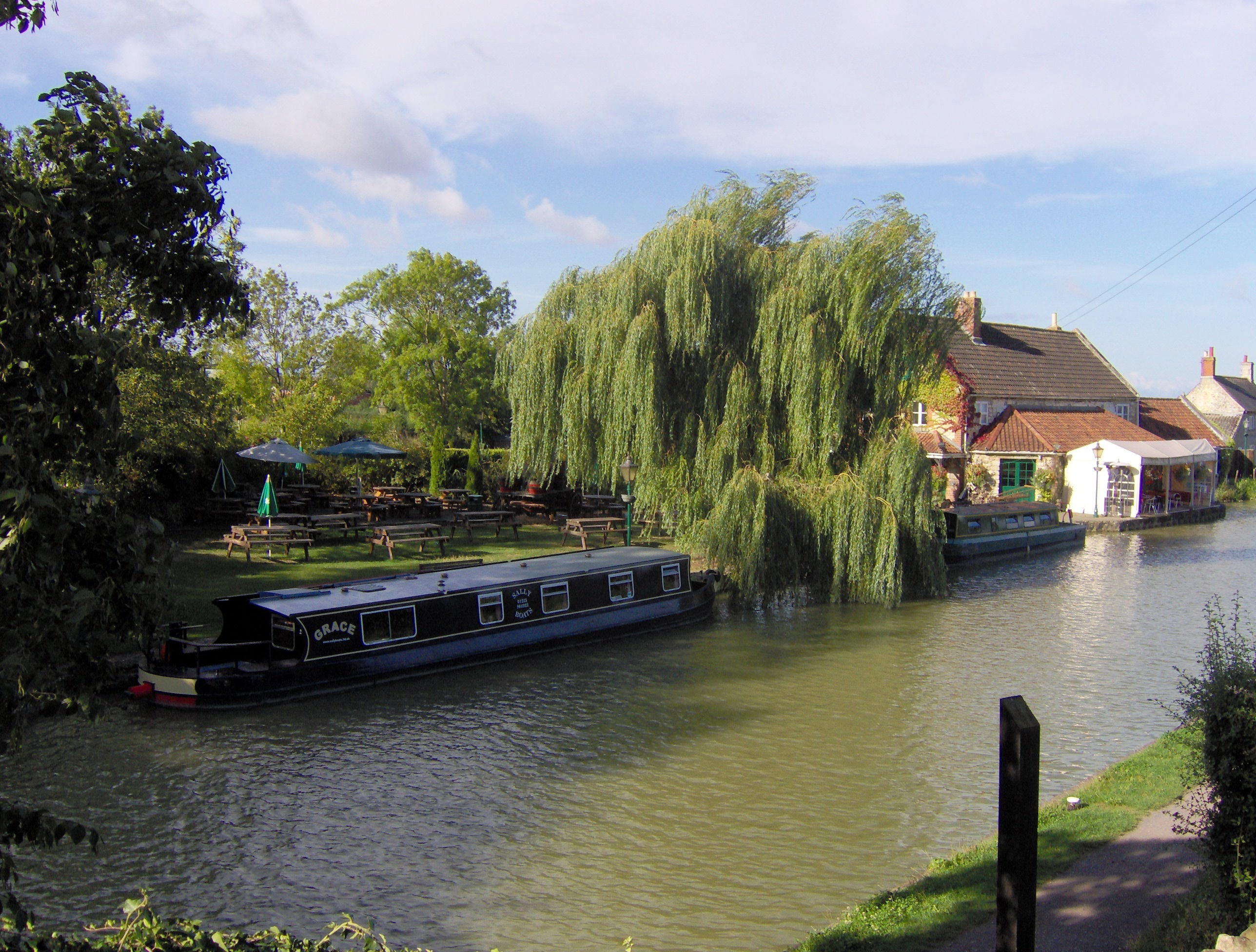
Barge Inn at Seend Cleeve

Seend Locks (grid reference ST933613) are at Seend Cleeve, Wiltshire on the Kennet and Avon Canal, England.

They have a combined rise/fall of 38 ft 4ins (11.68m).

During the 19th century there were several wharves at Seend primarily serving the Seend Iron Works but these have been disused for many years. The five locks at Seend Cleeve are numbered 17 to 21. The Barge Inn is next to Seend Wharf bridge and between locks 18 and 19.

A back pump has been installed to ensure that there is water to fill the locks, the outflow of which is on a road bridge above the top lock.

== See also ==
- Locks on the Kennet and Avon Canal

Next lock upstream	Kennet and Avon Canal	Next lock downstream
Caen Hill Locks	Seend Locks; Grid reference: ST933613	Semington Locks
