= North Wraxall =

Village in Wiltshire, England

Coordinates: 51.474°N 2.262°W

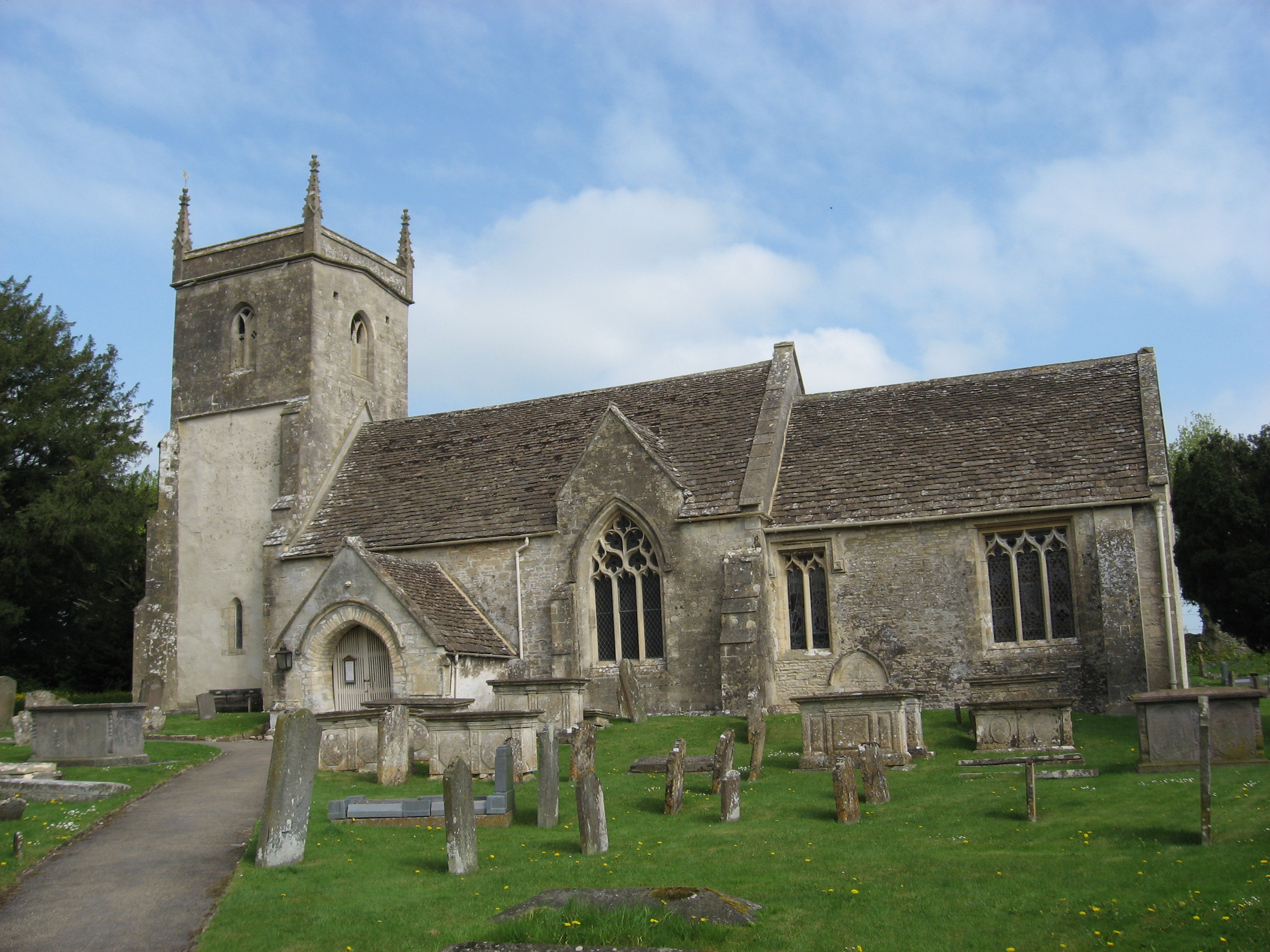
- Parish church of St James the Great

- Location within Wiltshire
- Population: 372 (2021 census)
- OS grid reference: ST819750
- Unitary authority: Wiltshire
- Ceremonial county: Wiltshire
- Region: South West
- Country: England
- Sovereign state: United Kingdom
- Post town: Chippenham
- Postcode district: SN14
- Dialling code: 01249
- Police: Wiltshire
- Fire: Dorset and Wiltshire
- Ambulance: South Western
- UK Parliament: South Cotswolds
- Website: Parish Council

North Wraxall is a village and civil parish in Wiltshire, England. The village is about 6 miles (10 km) west of Chippenham, just north of the A420 road between Chippenham and Bristol. The parish includes the village of Ford and the hamlets of Upper Wraxall, Mountain Bower and The Shoe. The population of the parish at the 2021 census was 372.

== Early history ==
The Fosse Way Roman road crosses the parish as a minor road. There was a Roman villa at Truckle Hill; the site has been excavated on at least three occasions, firstly by one of the Scrope family of landowners in 1852 and most recently in 2010. Some reports refer to the site as the North Wraxall or Truckle Hill villa. Evidence of a bath-house and corn drying ovens was found, the latter from the 4th century. The villa itself apparently had 16 rooms, and there were additional buildings and a cemetery. Neolithic flint tools and Iron Age brooches were also discovered not far from the villa, in 1985.

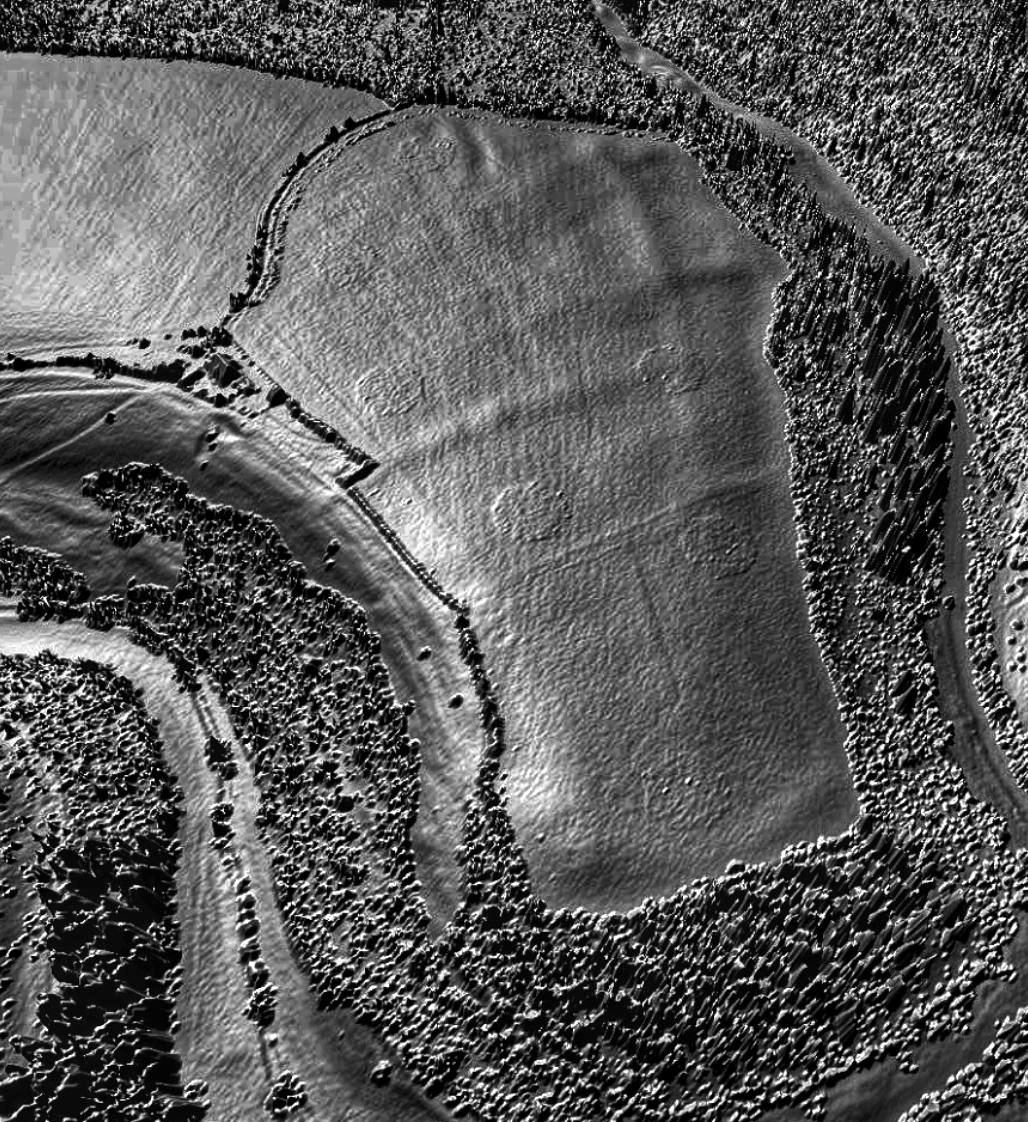
A lidar view of the site of a Roman villa, settlement and cemetery at Truckle Hill.

The Domesday Book of 1086 states that the land was held by "Baldwin in the reign of King Edward prior to the Norman Conquest" and by "Godfrey" afterwards; 32 households were recorded. The name of the community originated from Wroxall, derived from 'wroc' either meaning buzzard or a personal name, and 'healh' seen as an angle or corner.

This was an agricultural area in the 1800s; the cloth industry was also important for a time and many of the buildings housed workers. During that century the population increased and then declined, to 371 by 1891. In 2001, there were 348 people. No industry remained by the early 1900s and nearly all buildings once used for industry became residential.

== Parish church ==
The oldest parts of the Church of England parish church of St James the Great are 13th-century. The baptismal font and south porch are 14th-century. The north aisle was rebuilt in the 18th century. The building is Grade I listed. St James' parish is part of the Bybrook Benefice.

== Biological sites ==
Danks Down and Truckle Hill is a biological Site of Special Scientific Interest, as is Out Woods.
