= Woodford, Wiltshire =

Civil parish in Wiltshire, England

Coordinates: 51.134°N 1.825°W

Woodford
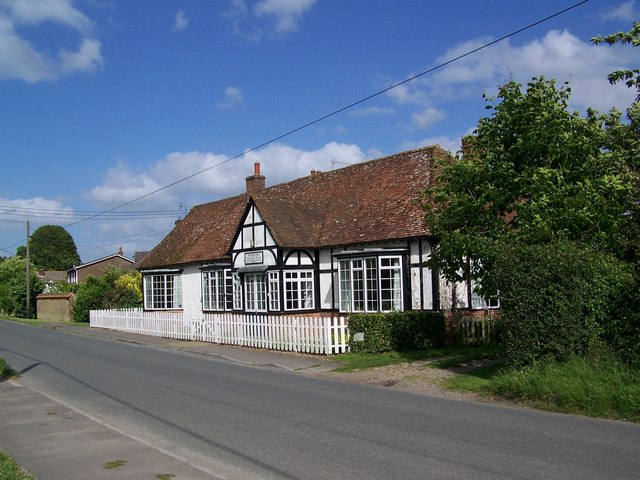
- Village Hall, Middle Woodford

- Location within Wiltshire
- Population: 443 (in 2011)
- OS grid reference: SU123372
- Civil parish: Woodford
- Unitary authority: Wiltshire
- Ceremonial county: Wiltshire
- Region: South West
- Country: England
- Sovereign state: United Kingdom
- Post town: Salisbury
- Postcode district: SP4
- Dialling code: 01722
- Police: Wiltshire
- Fire: Dorset and Wiltshire
- Ambulance: South Western
- UK Parliament: East Wiltshire
- Website: Woodford Valley

Woodford is a civil parish in southern-central Wiltshire, England, on the west bank of the Salisbury Avon, about 4 miles (6 km) north of Salisbury. Its settlements are the villages of Lower Woodford, Middle Woodford and Upper Woodford, the last of which is the largest of the three. In 1871, the population was 523; in 1951, this had decreased to 405 people.

== History ==
In 972, the name was recorded as Wuduforda, which in Old English means "ford in or by a wood", from wudu + ford. In the nineteenth century it was pronounced 'oodford.

The Domesday Book survey included Woodford manor under Salisbury, thus the land (with a mill) was held by the bishop of Salisbury. The manor house was one of the bishop's residences in the 12th, 13th and 14th centuries but had fallen into ruin by the 16th century; the land remained the property of the bishop until 1869.

Woodford is mentioned in the days of Henry III, in connection with a knight, Sir William Woodford of Woodford.

Another manor, Heale, is first mentioned in 1316. Later owners include Sir William Cope (d.1513), cofferer to Henry VII; William Green MP (d.1554–55); and from 1600, Sir Lawrence Hyde II (1562–1641), lawyer and MP, and then his son, also Lawrence, again a lawyer and MP. Katherine, the latter's widow, gave shelter to the future Charles II at Heale House in October 1651 during his flight after the Battle of Worcester. The estate was inherited by Robert Hyde MP (1650–1722) who built the present Heale House.

The first village school was erected between 1833 and 1836, and increased in size in 1854. In 1880 the chief landowners were the Ecclesiastical Commissioners, and Robert Loder.

=== Druid's Lodge ===
In the north-west corner of the parish, on what is now the A360 Salisbury-Stonehenge road, the Druid's Head (or Woodford Hut) was described in 1869 as a lonely inn; around that time the landlord trained racehorses, and there were racing stables here at Druid's Lodge House well into the 20th century. The premises are now the home of Druid's Lodge Polo Club.

From 1917 to 1919, 160 acres (65 ha) on both sides of the road was the site of Lake Down Aerodrome, a training airfield for the Royal Flying Corps and the United States Air Service. Druid's Lodge House was requisitioned as a Wing headquarters, and an extension of the Amesbury and Military Camp Light Railway connected the site northward to Larkhill Camp. The airfield's six hangars and other buildings were removed but a water tower, engine shed and workshop survive.

A prisoner-of-war camp was sited south of Druid's Lodge during the Second World War, but the buildings no longer exist. Nearby is a small stone shelter, erected as a memorial to Lieutenant Colonel F. G. G. Bailey (d. 1951), who lived at Lake House, Wilsford.

== Geography ==
Woodford is approximately 2,780 acres (1,130 ha) in size. On a hill slope southwest of Druid's Head, there is a large and old enclosure that was formed by a bank.

Lower Woodford Water Meadows is a 23.9 hectares (59 acres) biological Site of Special Scientific Interest (SSSI) in Lower Woodford, notified in 1971. Of the working water-meadows in southern England that are associated with chalk streams, the best is at Lower Woodford. Further south is Camp Down, a chalk grassland SSSI notified for its rich variety of plants.

== Notable buildings ==
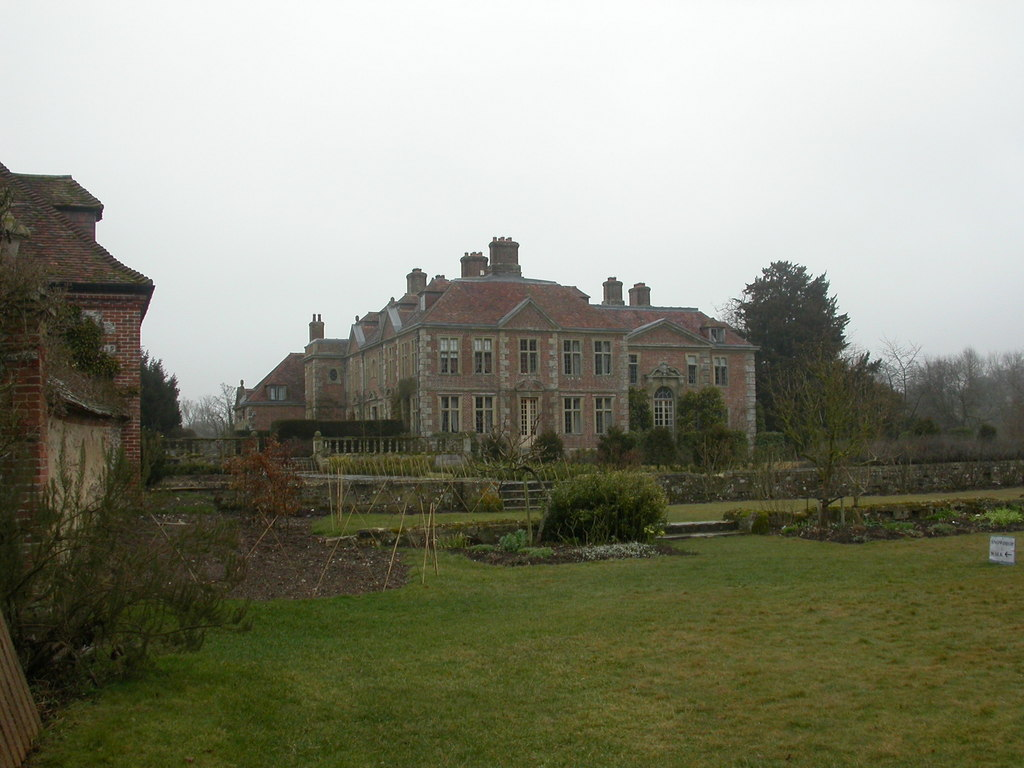
Heale House, Middle Woodford

Heale House, near Middle Woodford, is Grade I listed and was enlarged in 1670–1700 for Robert Hyde; its notable gardens were designed by Harold Peto. Extensive additions in matching style were made to the house in 1894 by Detmar Blow. It is described by Pevsner as "a fine varied brick house with stone dressings". King Charles II stayed twice at Heale House in October 1651 during his escape.

Also at Middle Woodford, the former water mill in flint and chalk chequerwork dates from the 18th century, and the village cross has a medieval plinth, base and shaft.

At Lower Woodford, the 17th-century Manor House is Grade II listed. Avon Cottage, a timber-framed house originally built in the 15th century, was recased in red brick in the late 18th or early 19th century, with 20th-century additions to the south and east. The collar-beam roof was reconstructed in the late 16th or early 17th century when a ceiling was added in the hall. The Court House, on the east side of the road, on the site of the manor of the bishops of Salisbury, has one block from the 16th century and a second of 1840.

== Parish church ==
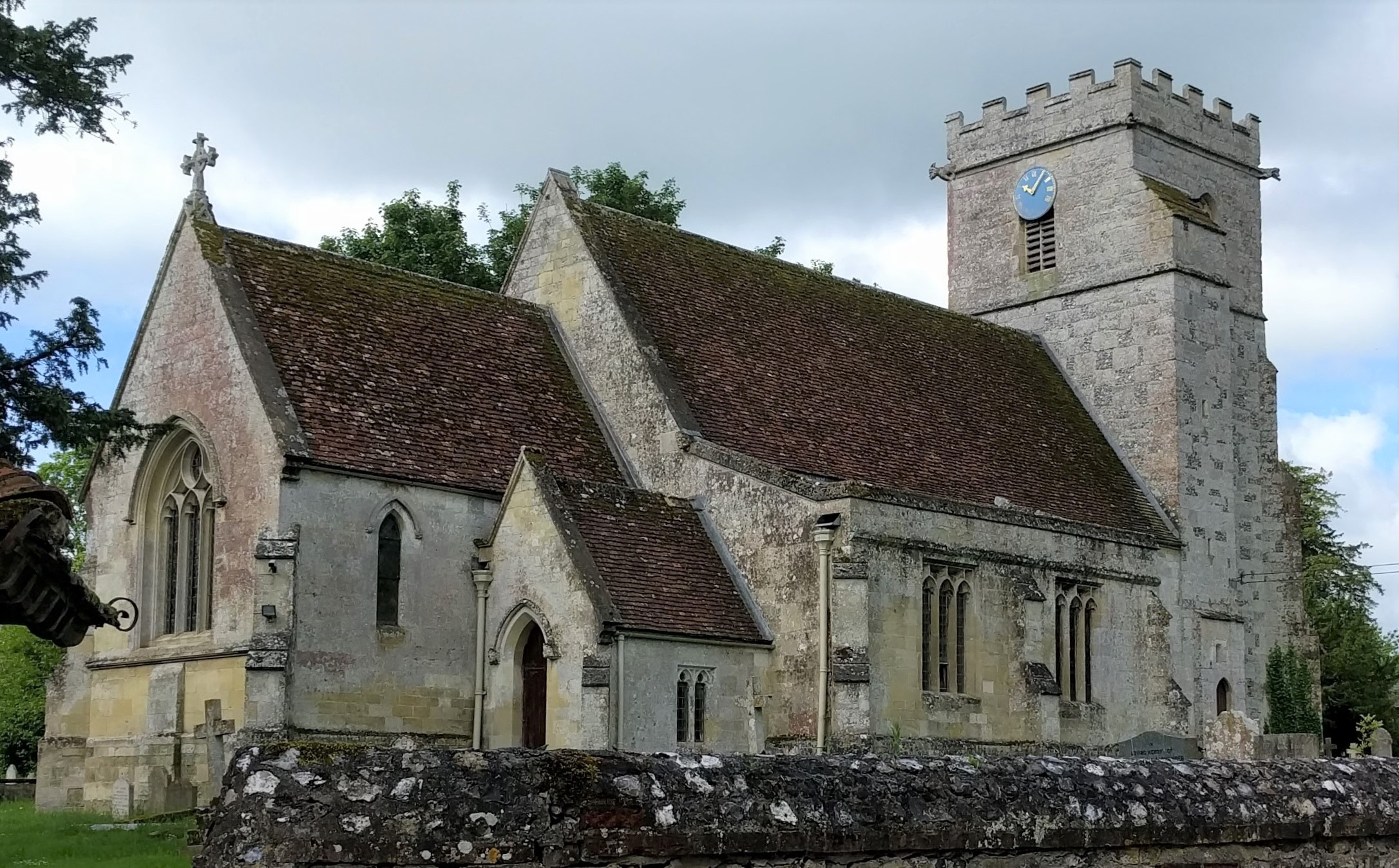
All Saints' Parish Church, Middle Woodford

The Church of England parish church of All Saints stands close to the river at Middle Woodford. There was a church on this site in the 12th century but the only surviving feature is the south doorway. The west tower, in flint and limestone, is from the 15th century. The rest of the church was rebuilt on the same foundations in 1845, in local ashlar, to designs of T.H. Wyatt, and at the same time the north aisle and vestry were added. The rebuilding retained most of the features of the 13th-century chancel and 15th-century nave.

All six bells were cast or recast in 1899. The interior retains the west gallery, reconstructed in the early 20th century. The deeply carved font is of the 15th century. Stained glass in the east window and two in the north aisle was designed by Ninian Comper, early in the 20th century. A monument to Gerard Erington (or Errington) of Heale is dated 1596.

Woodford and Wilsford churches had a long association; by the 13th century or earlier the two churches jointly endowed a prebend at Salisbury, and were the responsibility of a single vicar who was until 1842 appointed by the prebendary, although the two parishes were distinct. A list of prebends from 1220 to 1860 is displayed in the church and includes Robert, Archdeacon of Dorset who became the first antipope residing in Avignon in France, with the title Pope Clement VII. The vicarage was referred to as 'Wilsford and Woodford' or as 'Wilsford and Woodford-cum-Lake', Lake being another village in Wilsford parish. Durnford was added to the united benefice in 1974, and all three parishes were united. Today all three form the parish of the Woodford Valley with Archers Gate.

== Amenities ==
Woodford Valley C.E. Primary Academy at Middle Woodford serves the villages and surrounding parishes. Near to the church, it began as a National school in 1872.

There are two pubs: the Bridge Inn at Upper Woodford and the Wheatsheaf Inn at Lower Woodford.

The Monarch's Way long-distance footpath passes through Lower and Middle Woodford.
