= Stock, Wiltshire =

Hamlet in Wiltshire, England

Coordinates: 51.423°N 2.007°W

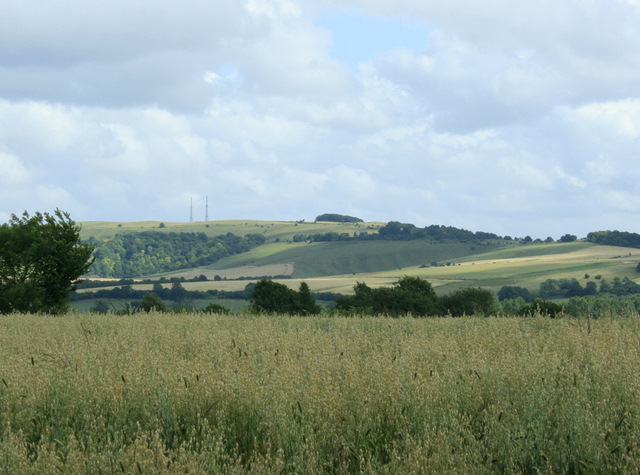
Farmland including part of Stockstreet Farm

Stock is a small settlement and former ecclesiastical parish, now part of Heddington civil parish, in the ceremonial county of Wiltshire, England. It lies about 1 mile (1.6 km) south of the town of Calne.

Samuel Lewis said in A Topographical Dictionary of England (1848):

STOCK, a tything, in the parish, union, and hundred of Calne, Chippenham and Calne, and N. divisions of Wilts; containing 328 inhabitants. It is situated on a tributary of the river Avon, and to the south of the road leading from Droitwich to Alcester.

Stock was part of the Calne hundred, and its history is included in the parish history of Calne in the Wiltshire Victoria County History's Volume XVII (2002). Although Stock had open fields and common pastures, it did not have a nuclear settlement. Before the Norman Conquest of England and still in 1086 the land at Stock was almost certainly part of the royal estate of Calne. Land at Stockley lies to the south, and the boundary between Stock and Stockley is uncertain. Land at Stock had been granted away from Calne by 1144, although the area it then covered is unknown. Some of it was probably granted to Fulk de Cauntelo about 1199, and from 1763 on Stock was inherited with the manors of Calne and Calstone as part of the Bowood House estate. In 1728, Stock was divided between Hollow Ditch farm (now called Holly Ditch) and a farm now gone, with buildings near Quobbs Farm, on the west side of the road from Devizes to Calne (now the A3102). As part of the Bowood estate, the land of those two farms, and other land at Stock, totalling about 350 acres, was inherited by Charles Petty-Fitzmaurice, 9th Marquess of Lansdowne, in 1999.

The Ordnance Survey map surveyed in 1884 shows a roadside hamlet named Stock Street near Stock Street Farm, and another named Mile Elm, further south along the road and near a farm of the same name which lies between Quobbs and Holly Ditch. Modern maps show only Mile Elm.
