= Stockley, Wiltshire =

Village in Wiltshire, England

Coordinates: 51.406°N 1.998°W

Stockley
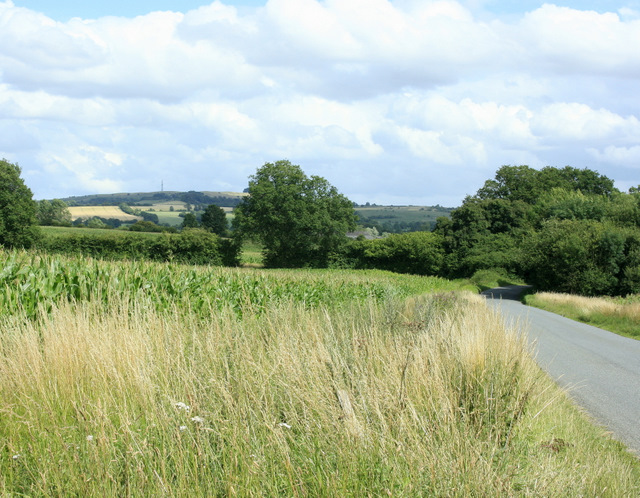
- Road to Stockley and Heddington

- Location within Wiltshire
- OS grid reference: SU002674
- Civil parish: Heddington
- Unitary authority: Wiltshire
- Ceremonial county: Wiltshire
- Region: South West
- Country: England
- Sovereign state: United Kingdom
- Post town: CALNE
- Postcode district: SN11 0
- Dialling code: 01249
- Police: Wiltshire
- Fire: Dorset and Wiltshire
- Ambulance: South Western
- UK Parliament: Melksham and Devizes

Stockley is a small village 4 km (2 mi) south of Calne in Wiltshire, England. It lies about 3/4 mile (1.2 km) north of the larger village of Heddington, at the foot of the western extremity of the North Wessex Downs.

No settlements were recorded in Domesday Book, and the area was part of the king's large Calne estate. Stockley, together with Stock to the north, anciently formed a triangle of farmland to the south of Calne town; Stockley's southern boundary was the Roman road, and the boundary with Stock is uncertain. The Wiltshire Victoria County History recounts the history of the farmsteads, most of which were along the roads at the edges of the triangle. From 1763 some of the farms were part of the Bowood estate; most of that part was sold by the Marquess of Lansdowne in 2001.

Two farms lent their names to present-day hamlets: Broad's Green and Mile Elm.

From 1890 to 2025, the village was within the civil parish of Calne Without, but was transferred to Heddington at the May 2025 elections. Wiltshire Council is the unitary authority, which is responsible for all significant local government functions.

In 1841 a Primitive Methodist chapel was built at Stockley. It closed in 1966 and has since been demolished.

Stockley was transferred from Calne ecclesiastical parish to Heddington in 1887; today the parish is part of the Oldbury grouping.
