= Bradley Wood (disambiguation) =

Bradley Wood (born 1991) is an English footballer.

Bradley Wood may also refer to:

- Bradley Wood West Yorkshire, the base of and county camp-site for West Yorkshire County Scouts

== See also ==
- Bradley Woods, an area of woodland in Wiltshire
- Bradley and Dixon Woods, a local nature reserve near Grimsby, North East Lincolnshire
