= Ford, North Wiltshire =

Village in Wiltshire, England

Coordinates: 51.472°N 2.230°W

Ford
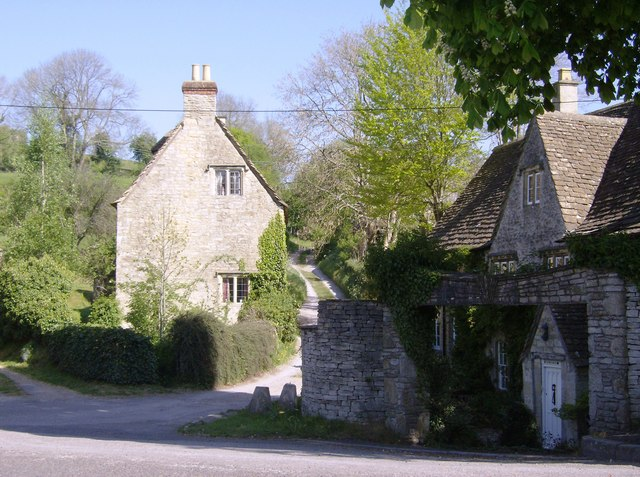
- Cottages in Ford

- Location within Wiltshire
- OS grid reference: ST841748
- Civil parish: North Wraxall
- Unitary authority: Wiltshire
- Ceremonial county: Wiltshire
- Region: South West
- Country: England
- Sovereign state: United Kingdom
- Post town: Chippenham
- Postcode district: SN14
- Dialling code: 01249
- Police: Wiltshire
- Fire: Dorset and Wiltshire
- Ambulance: South Western
- UK Parliament: South Cotswolds

Ford is a small village in the north-west of Wiltshire, England. The village is on the A420 road, 4 miles west of Chippenham and 11 miles east of Bristol.

Ford is the second largest village in the civil parish of North Wraxall, a collection of five settlements which includes Upper Wraxall, North Wraxall, The Shoe (also on the A420) and Mountain Bower. There is a pub called the White Hart, but no other shops.

The Bybrook River flows through the village.

A church of St John was designed by C.E. Ponting in 1896 and converted into a residence in 2001.
