= West Down (disambiguation) =

West Down is a village in the county of Devon.

West Down may also refer to:

== In Northern Ireland ==
- The western part of County Down
- West Down (Northern Ireland Parliament constituency), a county constituency from 1929–1972
- West Down (UK Parliament constituency), a county constituency from 1885–1922

== See also ==
- West Yatton Down, a biological Site of Special Scientific Interest (SSSI) in Wiltshire, England
- West Woodhay Down, a designated Site of Special Scientific Interest (SSSI) in Berkshire, England
