= Frederic Price (cricketer, born 1852) =

English clergyman, schoolmaster, and cricketer

Frederic William Stephen Price (26 February 1852 – 22 December 1937) was an English clergyman and schoolmaster, and a cricketer who played first-class cricket for Cambridge University and an England XI. He was born in Lutterworth, Leicestershire and died at Shoreham-by-Sea, Sussex. In some sources and on census returns, his first name is spelled "Frederick".

Price was educated at St John's College, Cambridge. As a cricketer, he was a lower-order right-handed batsman and a right-arm medium pace bowler. He played in three matches in the 1873 season and appeared in the trial for the Cambridge eleven in 1874, but his only first-class game that season was for an England XI against the university side, and he did not play again.

Price graduated from Cambridge University with a Bachelor of Arts degree in 1875, converting it to a Master of Arts in 1881. He became a priest in the Church of England and was curate at Bray, Berkshire to 1884. He then became a schoolmaster at Ovingdean Hall School near Brighton, at that time a preparatory school, but he returned to church duties as vicar of Bedwyn, Wiltshire from 1909 and then, from 1911 to 1922, as rector of Stanton St Quintin, also in Wiltshire. He then retired to Shoreham where he died in 1937.
