= Stanton St Quintin =

Village in Wiltshire, England

Coordinates: 51.518°N 2.136°W

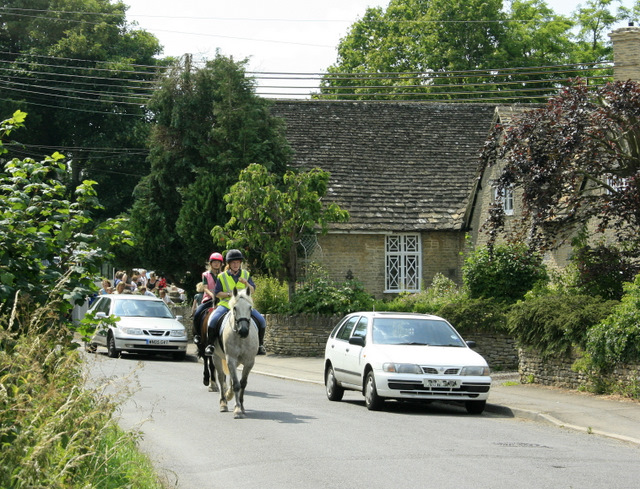
- The main road, Stanton St Quintin

- Location within Wiltshire
- Population: 851 (in 2011)
- OS grid reference: ST907799
- Unitary authority: Wiltshire
- Ceremonial county: Wiltshire
- Region: South West
- Country: England
- Sovereign state: United Kingdom
- Post town: Chippenham
- Postcode district: SN14
- Dialling code: 01666
- Police: Wiltshire
- Fire: Dorset and Wiltshire
- Ambulance: South Western
- UK Parliament: South Cotswolds
- Website: Parish Council

Stanton St Quintin is a small village and civil parish in the county of Wiltshire in England. It is about 4 miles (6.4 km) north of Chippenham and 5 miles (8.0 km) south of Malmesbury. The parish church dates in part from the 12th century.

The parish includes the hamlets of Clanville (in the southeast) and Lower Stanton St Quintin (on the A429 road, 0.6 miles (0.97 km) to the northeast).

== History ==
Farmland and woodland at Stantone in the ancient hundred of Chippenham, were recorded in the Domesday Book survey of 1086. There were 19 households, and estates were held by Glastonbury Abbey and Osbern Giffard.

There is a Roman villa site at Stanton Park in the west of the parish, about 3 miles (4.8 km) east of the Fosse Way. The Malmesbury-Chippenham road, crossing the parish from north to south, has been in use since at least 1100. There were two villages from 1223 or earlier: Stanton (on the road between Draycot Cerne and Grittleton, later called Upper Stanton) and Nether Stanton (later Lower Stanton). In the southeast of the parish is a moated site, about 50 metres square, of unknown date.

The St Quintin suffix is from the surname of a 13th-century lord of the manor. Later landowners include the des Bouverie baronets, beginning with Sir Edward (d. 1736) and their descendants the Earls of Radnor; the 6th earl, Jacob Pleydell-Bouverie sold most of the manor in 1909 and the holdings were later broken up. The manor house was demolished in 1856.

The early population was low, with only 49 poll-tax payers in the parish in 1377. Numbers increased in the 19th century, reaching 346 at the 1851 census before declining to 259 in 1931. The opening of RAF Hullavington in 1937 brought a substantial increase.

In 1971 the M4 motorway was built near to the southern boundary of the parish, and the boundary with Kington St Michael parish was later redrawn to follow it.

=== 18th-century murder ===
In 1764, two sailors had been paid off from HMS Stag, receiving £28 each. One was William Jacques, the son of Henry Jacques, rector of Leigh Delamere. On their way to Bristol, William met up with his companion, the black sailor George Hartford. After drinking at the Green Dragon in Malmesbury and other inns, Jacques accused Hartford of stealing his purse after witnessing how free Hartford had become with money. Jacques had earlier lost his purse and they began fighting. They were persuaded to leave the town and continued quarrelling on the road south, after Jacques tried to push Hartford into a mill pond. After they separated in Hullavington, Hartford continued into Stanton Park where he fell asleep at Black Pond. After obtaining food at the village, Jacques caught up with Hartford and beat him around the head with a hedge stake until he was dead and then stole his money.

Some boys saw the murder, raised the alarm and Jacques was pursued by a group of villagers. A woodman found Hartford's body and an hour or two later, Jacques was traced through Kington St Michael and was captured at an alehouse in Chippenham, where he was found to have a pocketful of money and was wearing Hartford's handkerchief around his neck. Jacques confessed to the murder, and at his trial in Salisbury confessed to three other murders and a robbery of a man of £10 on Hounslow Heath. Sentenced to death, on 14 August 1764 Jacques was hanged on Stanton Common, between Upper and Lower Stanton, a little to the east of Stock Wood, at a public execution; people came from Malmesbury and Chippenham to watch. George Hartford was buried in Stanton St Quintin churchyard on 26 May 1764, the entry next to his burial record stating "Murdered by Jacques".

== Parish church ==
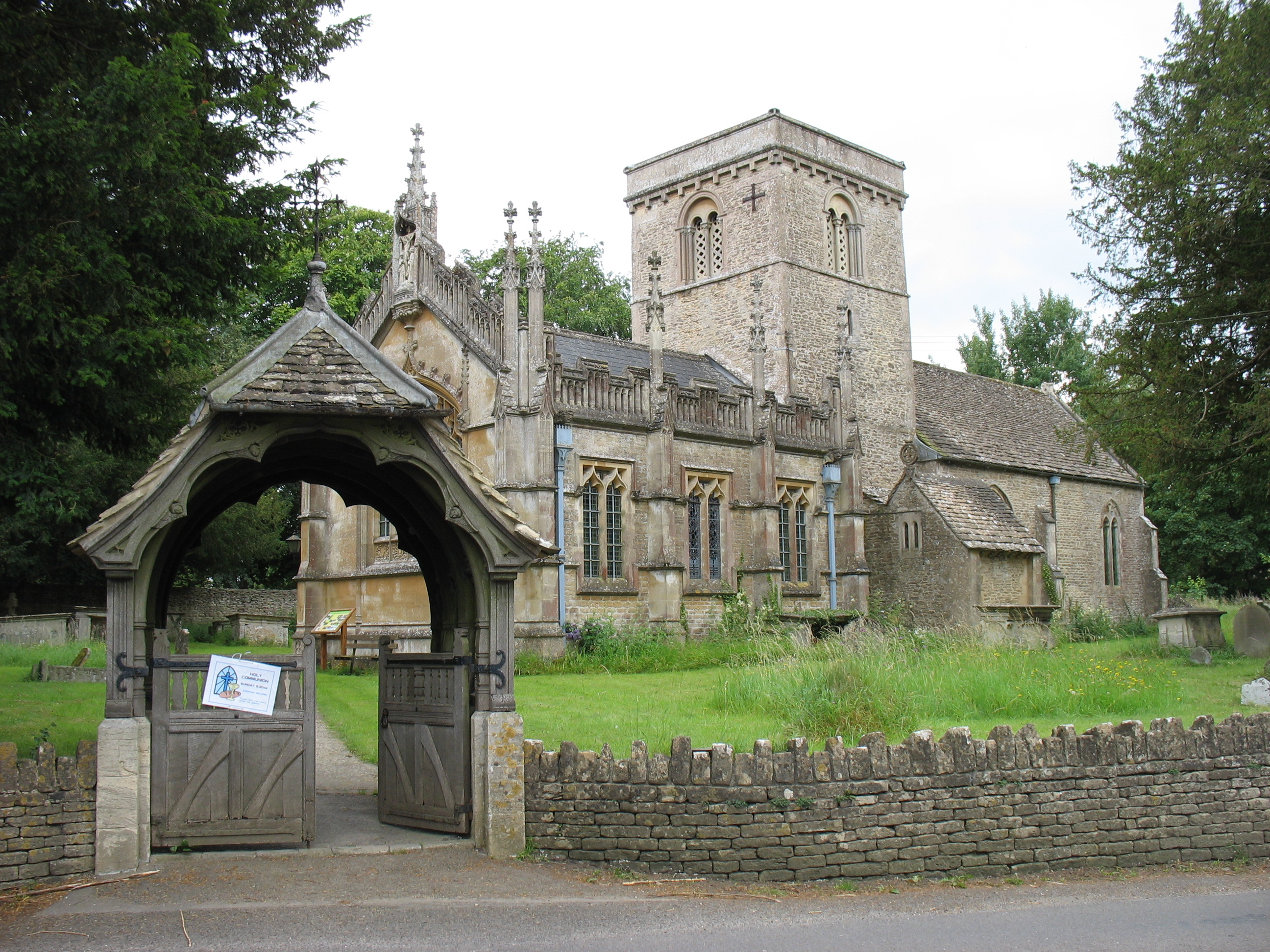
St Giles' Church

The parish church of St Giles is built in rubble stone and dates from the 12th century. The nave and lower part of the central tower are largely unchanged from that time; the south arcade was added in the early 13th and the nave re-roofed in the 15th. J.H. Hakewill carried out alterations and restoration in 1826 and 1851, and in 1888 C.E. Ponting oversaw the rebuilding of the chancel in ornate Perpendicular style, faced in ashlar. On the outside of the west wall of the nave, below the 1851 window, is a 12th-century carved figure of Christ, seated and with his feet on a dragon. The north side of the tower contains a Sheela na gig carving, one of only forty five in Britain. The south porch, rebuilt in the 19th century, reuses a 12th-century inner doorway and an outer doorway of c. 1175, described as exceptional by Historic England, having elaborate stone carving with some details similar to those found at Malmesbury Abbey. The decorated stone font and its plinth are 12th century, and the west arch of the tower also has early carving.

The nave has a stained glass window designed by Christopher Whall and made by James Powell and Sons in 1888. The church was recorded as Grade II* listed in 1960.

Notable rectors include Frederic Price (cricketer), from 1911 to 1922; who was followed by Gordon Tidy (soldier, author and poet, for a time in charge of the cathedral at Bathurst, New South Wales). In 1967 the benefice was united with that of Grittleton with Leigh Delamere, and in 1976 Hullavington and Norton were added. Today the parish is one of eight covered by the Gauzebrook group ministry.

== Local government ==
The civil parish elects a parish council. It is in the area of Wiltshire Council unitary authority, which is responsible for all significant local government functions.

== Amenities ==
There is a village hall and a primary school, which was opened in 1849 and overseen by Lord Radnor and a clergyman.

Stanton St. Quintin Quarry and Motorway Cutting is a geological Site of Special Scientific Interest.

== Military connections ==
The southern part of Hullavington Airfield (formerly RAF Hullavington) is in the parish. Historic England states that several of the station's buildings, such as the Officers' Mess, represent the "improved architectural quality characteristic of the air bases developed under the post-1934 expansion of the RAF".

The village school was greatly enlarged in 1952–4 to accommodate children of RAF personnel. The school had begun as a barn or cottage in 1838, with financial support from the Earl of Radnor, and had been enlarged in 1849 and 1891. Average attendance was 40 in 1891 but had dropped to 26 by 1938; however, an additional 100 were expected in 1953.

The RAF left the airfield in 1993 although it continued to be used by Volunteer Gliding Schools until 1996. The administration and accommodation buildings were transferred to the Army and renamed Buckley Barracks in 2003, and in 2016 the airfield section of the site was sold to technology company Dyson, who converted two hangars for office use.
