= Great Quarry, Swindon =

Geological Site of Special Scientific Interest in Wiltshire, England

Coordinates: 51.55109°N 1.78362°W

Great Quarry, Swindon (grid reference SU151836) is a 0.994 hectare geological Site of Special Scientific Interest (SSSI) in Wiltshire, England, notified in 1951.

== Location ==
The site is in Old Town, in the southern ridge of Swindon. It was formerly named Town Garden Quarries which, with the Old Town Station Cutting, comprised Town Garden Quarries and Station Cutting SSSI. The two are now separate with Station Cutting renamed Old Town Railway Cutting, Swindon, SSSI.

"It has long been famous for the richness of its molluscan faunas from the marine Swindon Roach. These beds, of Portlandian age, comprise a suite of sediments ranging in their depositional environment from freshwater and hypersaline lagoons to true marine shell beds and soil profiles. The site has been the subject of dozens of published accounts since the mid 19th century and is still the subject of active research. The channelled form and erosive pebbly bases which characterise the majority of the beds in this succession and the variety of environments exhibited make this by far the most complex Jurassic section in Britain."

== Sources ==
- Natural England citation sheet for the site (accessed 1 April 2022)
