= Dinton Quarry =

Geological Site of Special Scientific Interest in Wiltshire, England

Coordinates: 51.07652°N 1.99281°W

Dinton Quarry (grid reference SU006308) geological Site of Special Scientific Interest in Wiltshire with an area of 3,000 square metres (32,000 sq ft), notified in 1990. This long-disused quarry of Middle Purbeck limestone was the main source of the late Jurassic fossil insects described by Brodie in 1845.

== Sources ==
- Natural England citation sheet for the site (accessed 24 March 2022)
