= William Green (died 1555) =

English politician

William Green (by 1512 – 1554/55), of Woodford and Downton, Wiltshire, was an English politician.

He was a member (MP) of the parliament of England for Downton in 1547.
