= Bradley Woods =

Woodland in Wiltshire, England

Coordinates: 51.16784°N 2.301104°W

Bradley Woods (grid reference ST789410) is an area of woodland in Wiltshire, south of Longleat Woods and north of Gare Hill.

A 48.7 hectare area within the site has been notified as a biological Site of Special Scientific Interest, notification originally taking place in 1986.

== Sources ==
- Natural England citation sheet for the site (accessed 22 March 2022)
