= Seend Cleeve Quarry =

Geological Site of Special Scientific Interest in Wiltshire, England

Coordinates: 51.3471°N 2.0976°W

Seend Cleeve Quarry (grid reference ST933609) is a 7.5 acres (3.0 ha) Geological Site of Special Scientific Interest at Seend Cleeve, Wiltshire, England, notified in 1987. It is important for its strata from the Oxfordian stage of the Jurassic period, containing fossil ammonites and bivalves which aid stratigraphy.

The site was an iron ore quarry between the middle of the 19th century and the 1960s, and in the 19th century Seend Iron Works was nearby. None of these facilities have been preserved; the site is now pasture.

== See also ==
- Seend Ironstone Quarry and Road Cutting – another SSSI nearby
