= The Shoe =

Hamlet in Wiltshire, England

Coordinates: 51.467°N 2.277°W

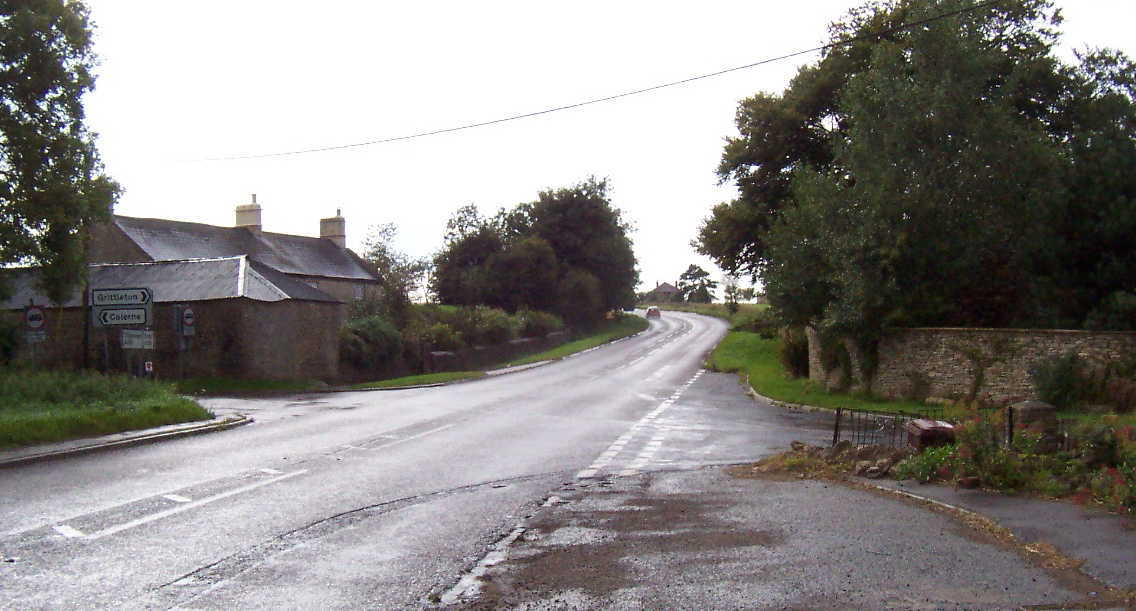
- The Fosse Way enters from the left and leaves to the right in this view of The Shoe

- Location within Wiltshire
- OS grid reference: ST809743
- Civil parish: North Wraxall
- Unitary authority: Wiltshire
- Ceremonial county: Wiltshire
- Region: South West
- Country: England
- Sovereign state: United Kingdom
- Post town: Chippenham
- Postcode district: SN14
- Dialling code: 01225; 01249
- Police: Wiltshire
- Fire: Dorset and Wiltshire
- Ambulance: South Western
- UK Parliament: South Cotswolds

The Shoe is a small hamlet in the parish of North Wraxall, in the north-west of Wiltshire in England. It lies at the junction of the Fosse Way (the old Roman road from Exeter to Lincoln) and the A420 (running from Bristol to Oxford). The settlement is named after the former inn, The Horse-shoe. Ordnance Survey maps show a smithy. Earlier maps show the smithy on the south side of the A420 road, while later maps show one on the north side of the road. The Shoe is about 7 miles (11 km) west of Chippenham and the same distance northeast of Bath.

A spring rises in the village, forming a tributary of the Bybrook River. To the south of the village, marking the boundary with Colerne, is Doncombe Brook, with Bury Camp – an Iron Age hillfort – rising above the Doncombe valley.

== Facilities ==
The Shoe Inn, marked on the 1:25,000 Ordnance Survey map, became a private house and is now used as a holiday let, although a board for public notices and a postbox are still outside.

A garage and several other businesses are based in the village.

Just off the Fosse Way, about 400 yards (370 m) north of the A420 junction, lies the North Wraxall village hall, called the Community Hall, offering a playgroup and other amenities.

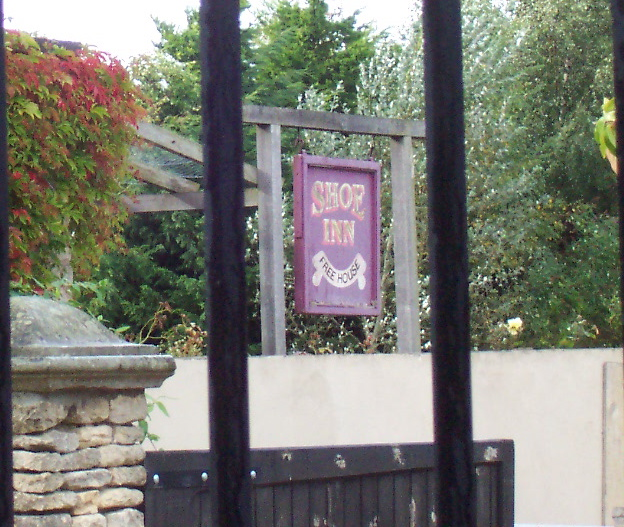
The Shoe Inn's sign displayed in a private garden in 2009

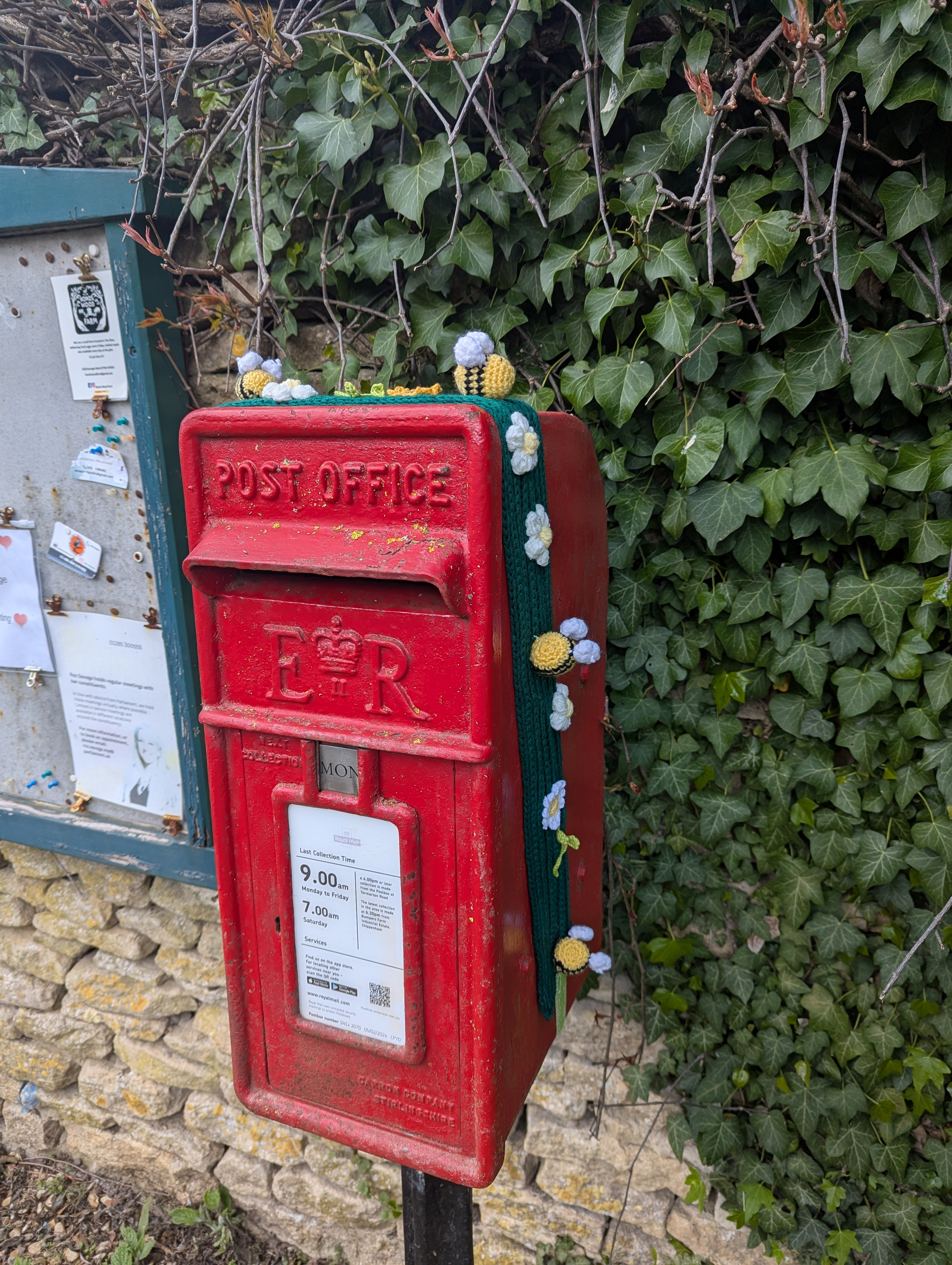
Postbox and parish council noticeboard at The Shoe

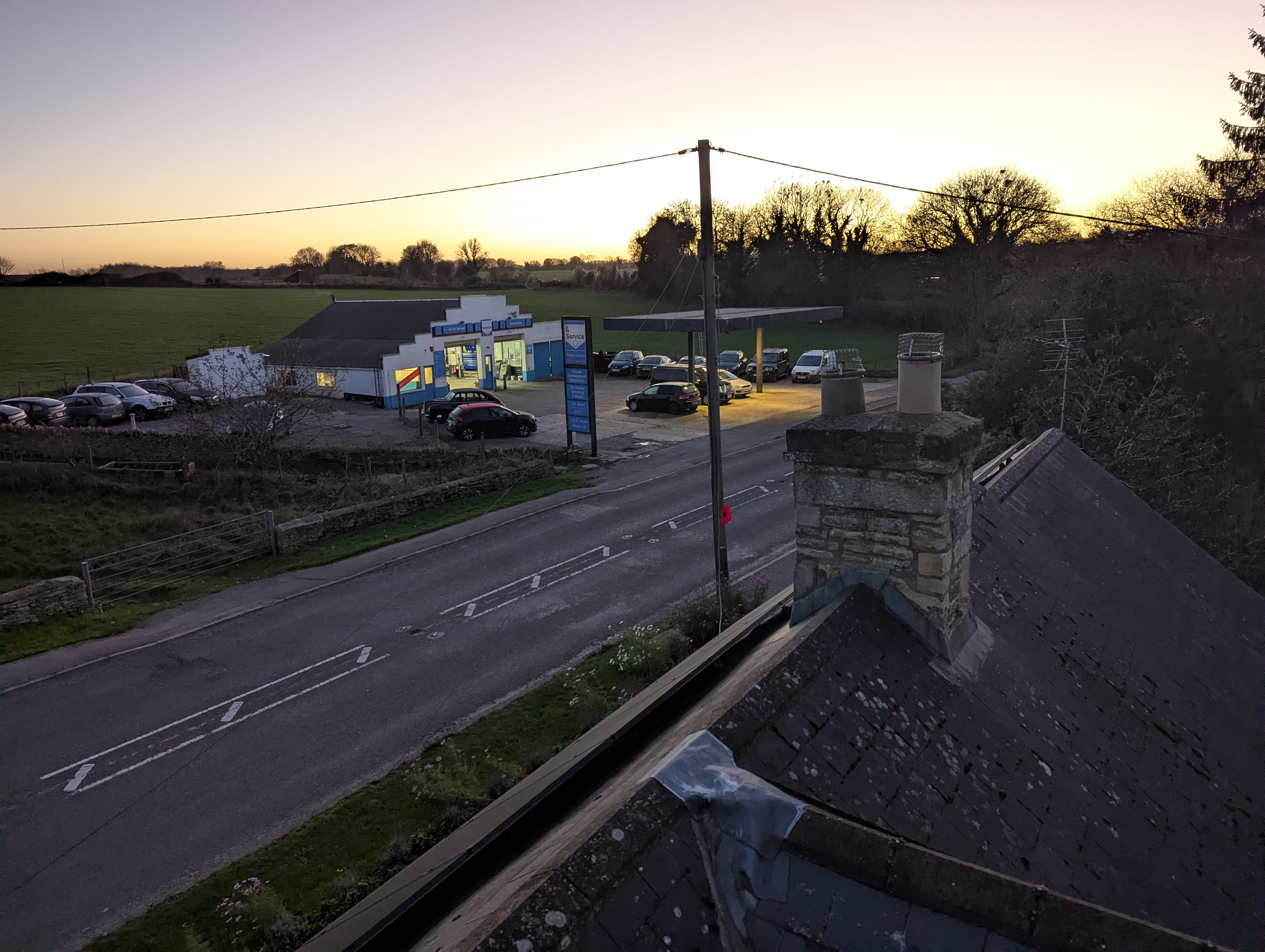
The Garage at The Shoe

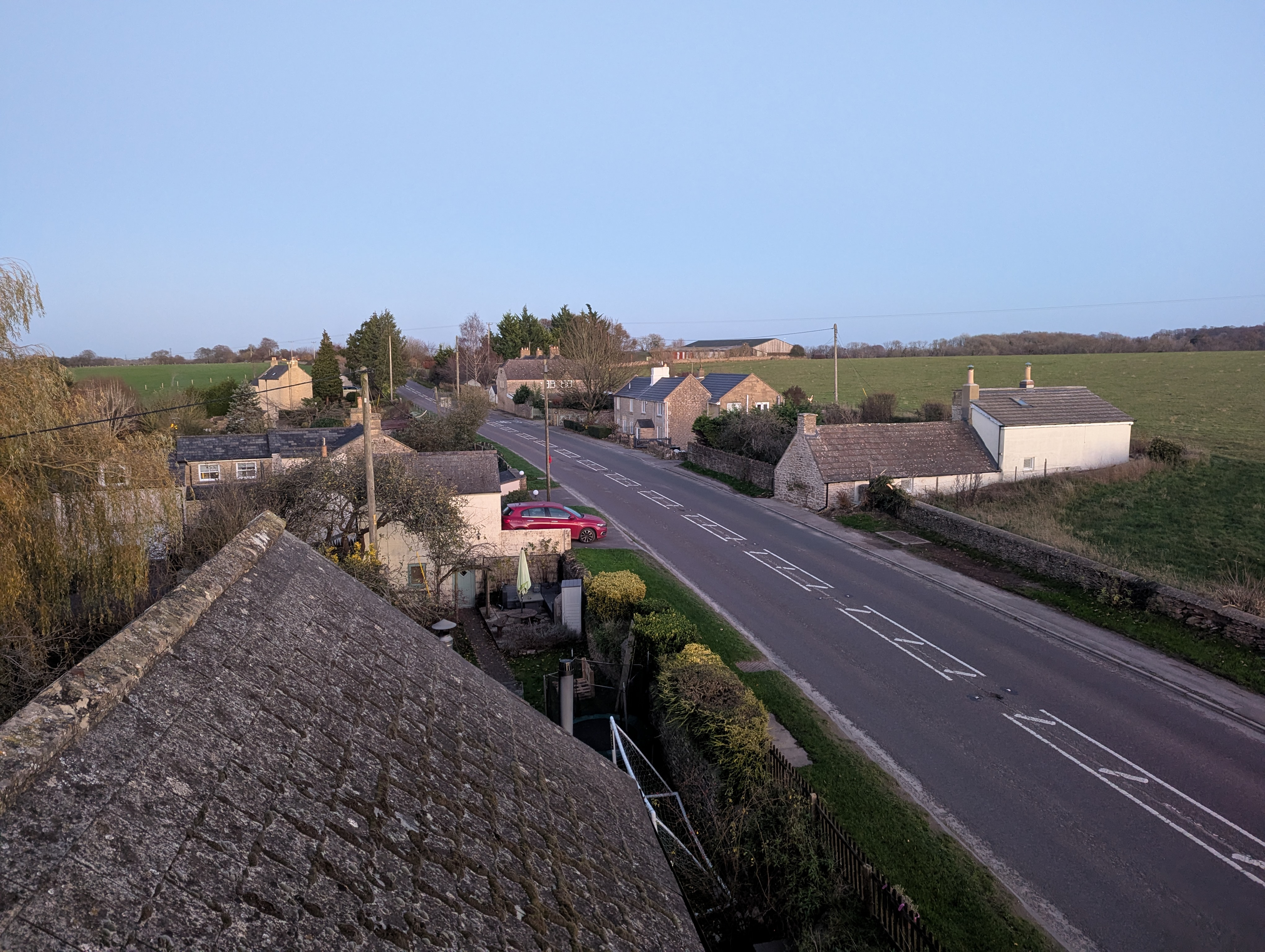
Looking west along the A420 towards Chippenham
