= Rack Hill =

10.6 hectare biological site of special scientific interest

Coordinates: 51.48453°N 2.22893°W

Rack Hill (grid reference ST842762) is a 10.6 hectare biological Site of Special Scientific Interest in Wiltshire, notified in 1975.

It is also the geographical name of the site of the Roman fort -of which there are now no visible remains- at Brancaster in Norfolk, then referred to as Branodunum.
