= Bincknoll Dip Woods =

Woodland in Wiltshire, England

Coordinates: 51.51522°N 1.84143°W

Bincknoll Dip Woods (grid reference SU111796) is a woodland in Wiltshire, England.

Two blocks within the site, an area of 5.7 hectare in total, have been notified as a biological Site of Special Scientific Interest, notification originally taking place in 1971.

== Sources ==
- Natural England citation sheet for the site (accessed 22 March 2022)
