= Little Grubbins Meadow =

Protected area in Wiltshire, England

Coordinates: 51.4944°N 2.2448°W

Little Grubbins Meadow (grid reference ST831773) is a 3.0 hectare biological Site of Special Scientific Interest in Wiltshire, England, notified in 1975.

== Sources ==
- Natural England citation sheet for the site (accessed 7 April 2022)
