= Charnage Down Chalk Pit =

Site of Special Scientific Interest in Wiltshire, England

Coordinates: 51.09517°N 2.23414°W

Charnage Down Chalk Pit (grid reference ST837329) is a 3.7 hectare geological Site of Special Scientific Interest in Wiltshire, England, lying east of the town of Mere. The former quarry site was notified in 1971 for its importance in the study of chalk rock from the late Turonian and Coniacian ages.

== Sources ==
- Natural England citation sheet for the site (accessed 23 March 2022)
