= Teffont Evias Quarry and Lane Cutting =

Geological Site of Special Scientific Interest in Wiltshire, England

Teffont Evias Quarry and Lane Cutting is a 3.6 hectare geological Site of Special Scientific Interest at Teffont Evias in Wiltshire, England, notified in 1989. It consists of two parts, Teffont Evias Quarry (grid reference ST990310), and Teffont Evias Lane Cutting (grid reference ST994309). Forest trees are currently growing on both sites, but there are small accessible exposures on the sides of quarry and roadway cuttings.

The sites offer exposures of a mid-Purbeck Lagerstätte, fine-grained limestone rock with good conditions for fossilization. These rocks and fossils were deposited after shallow seas receded about 146 million years ago. They record a warm environment of lakes and coastal lagoons, with occasional marine transgressions such as the Cinder Bed, and fresh-water phases, the Cherty Freshwater Member (in which the charophyte, Clavator reidi, grew in clear water perhaps 1-2m deep), and the Intermarine Member. Large fossils are rare, but there are insects of at least four Orders, fish, and crocodilians, also remains of vegetation including a large tree..

== Teffont Evias Quarry ==
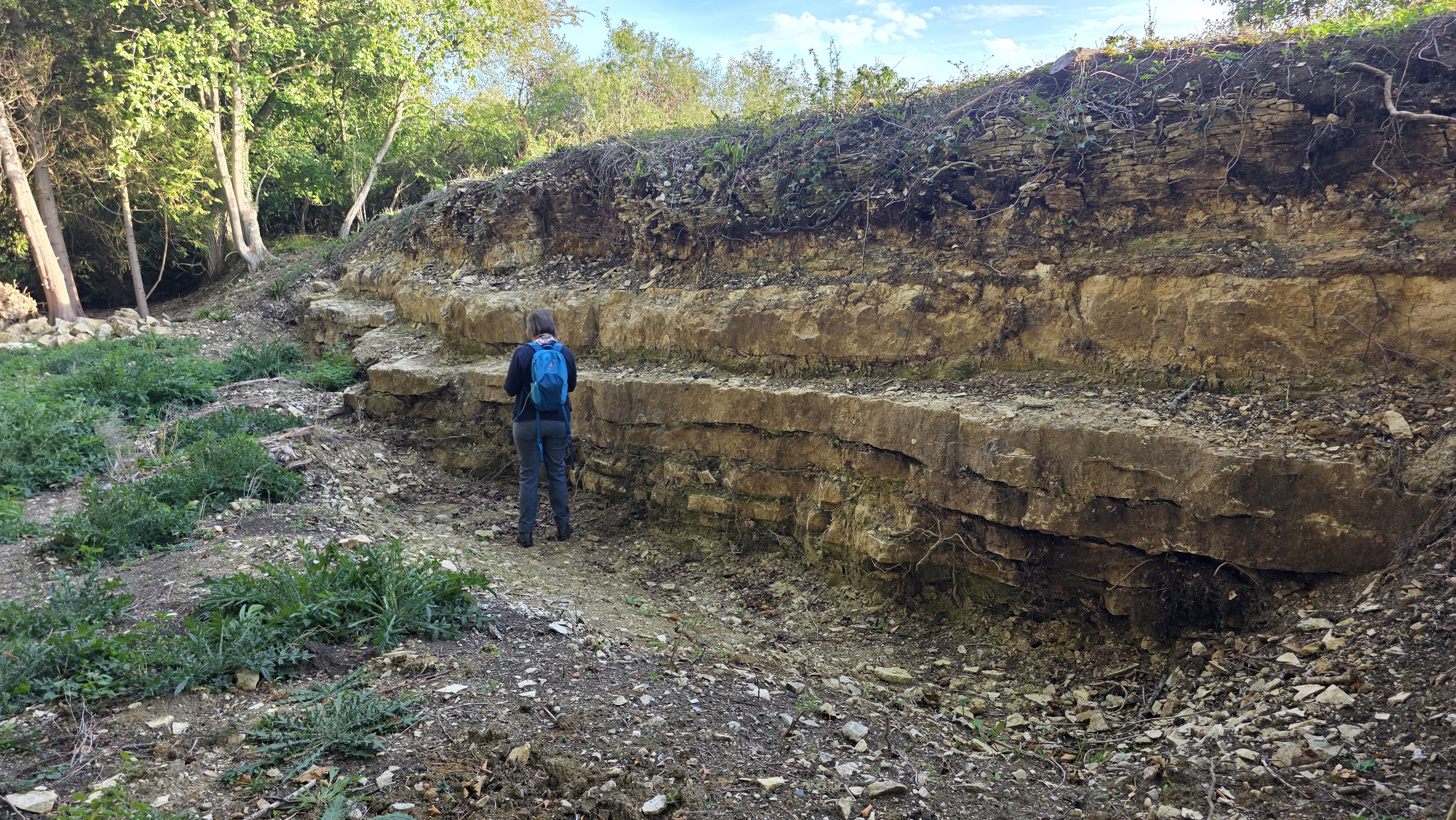
Quarry face at Teffont Evias Quarry SSSI, human figure for scale

This includes a pit with a recorded section from the early Jurassic Lias Group up to the Cinder Bed (formerly identified as the boundary between Jurassic and Cretaceous rocks, now regarded as early Cretaceous). With a wealth of fossils this is one of the most important Purbeck Bed localities outside Dorset.

== Teffont Evias Lane Cutting ==
This is a key site in the history of British palaeoentomology; it has produced rare, but well-preserved insects and is the best exposure of the Purbeck beds (Lower Cretaceous, Berriasian c. 144 Ma) for collecting fossil insects. These beds formed the main material for Peter Bellinger Brodie's "Insects in the Secondary Rocks of England", a seminal work and still significant today.
