= Porton Meadows =

Site of Special Scientific Interest in Wiltshire, England

Coordinates: 51.12479°N 1.73703°W

Porton Meadows (grid reference SU185362) is a 17.6 hectare biological Site of Special Scientific Interest in Wiltshire, England, notified in 1988.

== Sources ==
- "Porton Meadows SSSI". Natural England.
