= Chickengrove Bottom =

Protected area in Wiltshire, England

Coordinates: 50.99378°N 1.94438°W

Chickengrove Bottom (grid reference SU040216) is a 9.8 hectare biological Site of Special Scientific Interest to the south east of the village of Bowerchalke in Wiltshire, notified in 1975.

== Sources ==
- Natural England citation sheet for the site (accessed 23 March 2022)
