= Knapp and Barnett's Downs =

Protected area in Wiltshire, England

Coordinates: 51.03875°N 1.95859°W

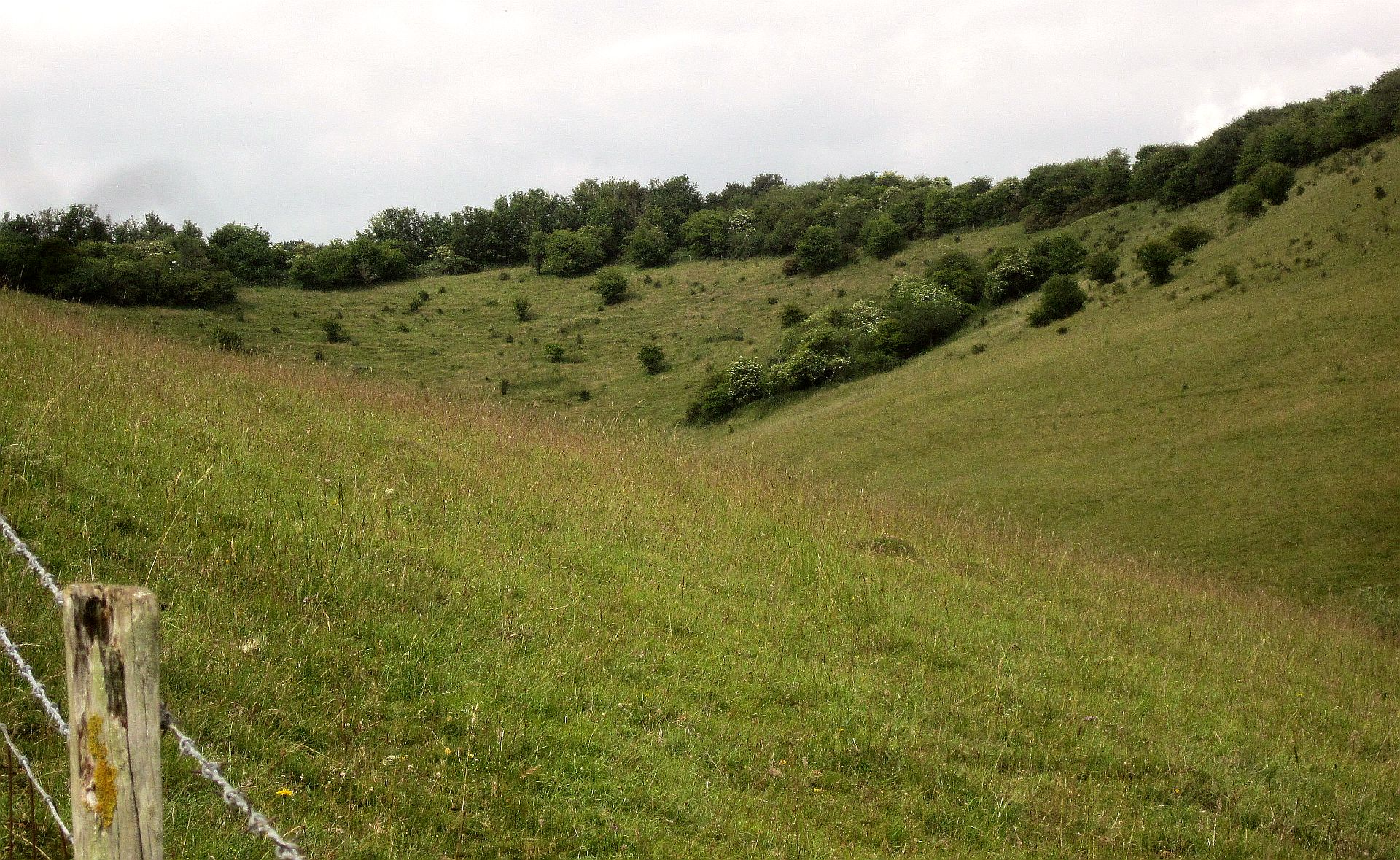
Dry valley, Knapp Down

Knapp and Barnett's Downs (grid reference SU030266) is a 71.4 hectare biological Site of Special Scientific Interest in Wiltshire, notified in 1971.

== Sources ==
- Natural England citation sheet for the site (accessed 7 April 2022)
