= Wylye and Church Dean Downs =

Protected area in Wiltshire, England

Coordinates: 51.1242°N 1.9985°W

Wylye and Church Dean Downs (grid reference SU002361) is an 80.9 hectare biological Site of Special Scientific Interest in Wiltshire, England, notified in 1951.

== Sources ==
- Natural England citation sheet for the site (accessed 25 May 2023)
