= Heddington =

Village in Wiltshire, England

Coordinates: 51.396°N 2.003°W

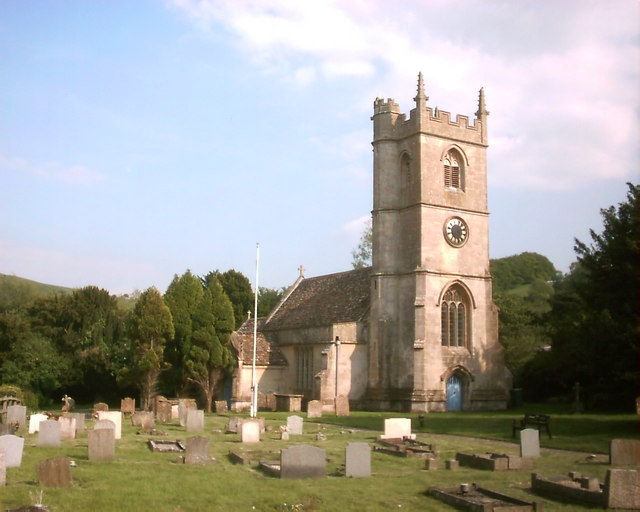
- St Andrew's Church

- Location within Wiltshire
- Population: 456 (in 2011)
- OS grid reference: ST999663
- Civil parish: Heddington
- Unitary authority: Wiltshire
- Ceremonial county: Wiltshire
- Region: South West
- Country: England
- Sovereign state: United Kingdom
- Post town: CALNE
- Postcode district: SN11
- Dialling code: 01380
- Police: Wiltshire
- Fire: Dorset and Wiltshire
- Ambulance: South Western
- UK Parliament: Melksham and Devizes
- Website: Parish Council

Heddington is a village and civil parish in Wiltshire, England, about 3 miles (5 km) south of Calne. The parish also includes the village of Stockley and the hamlets of Mile Elm, Broad's Green and Heddington Wick. In 2011 the parish had a population of 456.

King's Play Hill is a biological Site of Special Scientific Interest within the parish.

== History ==
On King's Play Hill, east of Heddington village, are a Neolithic long barrow and two bowl barrows.

The northern boundary of the parish follows the Roman road from London to Bath. In the early medieval period, the same course was followed by the Wansdyke earthwork.

In the 17th and 18th centuries the London-Bath road followed part of the southern boundary of the parish, where it climbed Beacon Hill. This route declined from the mid-18th century in favour of the road through Calne.

A small estate called Splatts originated with land purchases in the 1620s by Robert Child, whose son Francis was the founder of one of the first London banks, Child & Co. The land descended in the Child family and in 1729 Splatts House was built for another Francis Child on his marriage to Priscilla Brooke. The estate continued as the seat of the Childs until 1780 when it was superseded by Osterley Park, London.

A small school, with attached house, was built in the village c. 1833, became a National School in 1860, and was attended by 45–50 children in the 1870s.

Following Wiltshire Council's Community Governance Review 2021/22, a rural area north of Heddington which extends to the southern edge of Calne was transferred from Calne Without parish to Heddington. The area includes the village of Stockley and the hamlets of Mile Elm and Broad's Green. The changes took effect at the May 2025 elections.

== Religious sites ==
=== Parish church ===
There was a church at Heddington c. 1130, when it was given to Monkton Farleigh Priory. The Church of England parish church of St Andrew dates from a 13th-century rebuilding and the south arcade survives from that period; the north arcade is from the 14th. The tower is 15th-century and the building was restored in 1840–1 and 1976. The font may be from the 12th century or may be an 1840s copy. The building was designated as Grade II* listed in 1960.

==== Bells ====
The tower holds a 8-0-19 cwt ring of 6 in G. The oldest bell, the 5th, was cast in 1605 by John Wallis. In 1741, three more bells cast by Abel Rudhall where added to make a ring of 4. This consisted of the 3rd, 4th and tenor (6th). John Taylor & Co. added the 2nd in 1939 and also added a "modern" (for the time) frame made from cast iron. During the augmentation, John Taylor & Co. also overhauled the bells. Gillett & Johnston in 1953 added the treble (1st) to celebrate the coronation of Queen Elizabeth II. The treble is hung in a separate frame made of the same material by Gillet & Johnston on the same level.

==== Organ ====
The organ is a rebuilt chamber organ, although the builder and date are unknown. It has 9 stops including a "manual to pedal" coupler. There are 7 speaking stops with the 8th, the "Melody Bass", being a work in progress as of April 2023. The pedals and manual have two separate actions; the pedals being tubular-pneumatic action and the manual being tracker action. The mechanical bellow pump handle remains after the blowing system was converted to electric. In 1947, the organ was moved from the South choir to the East end of the South aisle.

==== Parish ====
Parish registers date back to 1538. In 1887, Stockley was transferred from Calne ecclesiastical parish to Heddington. The benefice was united with Calstone Wellington (which until then had been united with Blackland) in 1962. Since 1973 the parish has been part of the Oldbury benefice.

=== Other faiths ===
Quakers were active in the parish from the late 17th century and by 1681 had a burial ground west of the church, which went out of use before 1818 and was sold c. 1930.

Wesleyan Methodists built a small brick chapel in 1851 near Heddington Wick, on the road to Heddington; by 1864 its Sunday school was well attended. The chapel fell into disuse in the mid 20th century and was used as a scout hall from 1962; by 2012 it was derelict.

A Theravada Buddhist meditation centre – The International Meditation Centre in the tradition of Sayagyi U Ba Khin and Mother Sayamagyi – has been situated in Splatts House since late 1978.

== Amenities ==
The school continues as Heddington CofE (VA) Primary School. A village hall stands next to the school, and the village has a public house, the Ivy. The Wessex Ridgeway long-distance footpath crosses the southeast of the parish.

Every July, the parish is host to the Heddington and Stockley Steam Rally which attracts steam engine owners from across the globe.
