= Mile Elm =

Hamlet in Wiltshire, England

Coordinates: 51.422°N 2.012°W

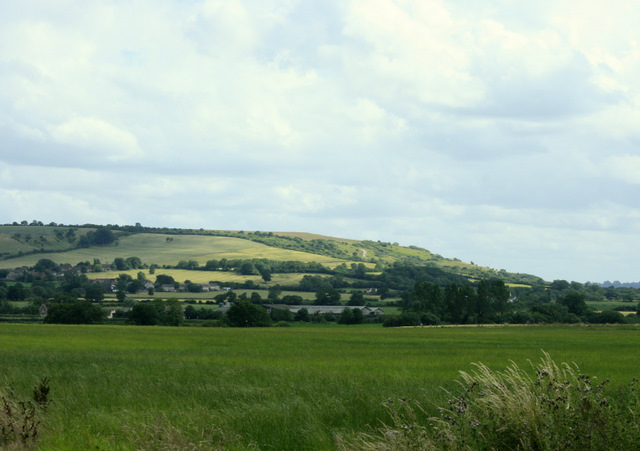
- View to the south

- Location within Wiltshire
- OS grid reference: ST993692
- Civil parish: Heddington
- Unitary authority: Wiltshire
- Ceremonial county: Wiltshire
- Region: South West
- Country: England
- Sovereign state: United Kingdom
- Post town: Calne
- Postcode district: SN11
- Police: Wiltshire
- Fire: Dorset and Wiltshire
- Ambulance: South Western
- UK Parliament: Melksham and Devizes

Mile Elm is a hamlet in central Wiltshire, England, with around 40 residents. It lies on the A3102 road, 1.5 miles (2.4 km) south-west of the town of Calne.

There was a farm at Mile End in 1728; the area to the east of the road was the tithing of Stock. The hamlet is within the civil parish of Heddington, having been transferred from Calne Without in May 2025. Wiltshire Council is the unitary authority which is responsible for all significant local government functions.

Mile Elm backs onto part of the Marquess of Lansdowne's Bowood estate. Larger nearby villages include Heddington, Bromham and Sandy Lane.
