= Bracknell Croft =

Protected area in Wiltshire, England

Coordinates: 51.09603°N 1.74433°W

Bracknell Croft (grid reference SU180330) is a 4.8 hectare biological Site of Special Scientific Interest in Wiltshire, notified in 1971.

== Sources ==
- Natural England citation sheet for the site (accessed 22 March 2022)
