= Peter Bellinger Brodie =

English geologist and churchman (1815-1897)

Peter Bellinger Brodie (1815 – 1 November 1897) was an English geologist and churchman, the son of the conveyancer Peter Bellinger Brodie and nephew of Sir Benjamin C. Brodie. He was born in London in 1815. While residing with his father at Lincoln's Inn Fields, he gained some knowledge of natural history and an interest in fossils from visits to the museum of the Royal College of Surgeons, at a time when William Clift was curator. Through the influence of Clift he was elected a fellow of the Geological Society early in 1834.

Proceeding to Emmanuel College, Cambridge, Brodie came under the influence of Adam Sedgwick, and devoted his time to geology. Entering the church in 1838, he was curate at Wylye in Wiltshire, and for a short time at Steeple Claydon in Buckinghamshire, becoming later rector of Down Hatherley in Gloucestershire, and finally (1855) vicar of Rowington in Warwickshire, and rural dean. Records of geological observations in all these districts were published by him.

At Cambridge Brodie obtained fossil shells from the Pleistocene deposit at Barnwell, Northamptonshire; in the Vale of Wardour he discovered in Purbeck Beds the isopod named by Henri Milne-Edwards Archaeoniscus Brodiei; in Buckinghamshire he described the outliers of Purbeck and Portland Beds; and in the Vale of Gloucester the lias and oolites claimed his attention. Fossil insects, however, formed the subject of his special studies (History of the Fossil Insects of the Secondary Rocks of England, 1845), and many of his published papers relate to them. At present the best exposure of his Purbeck beds for collecting fossil insects is at Teffont Evias Quarry / Lane Cutting.

Brodie was an active member of the Cotteswold Naturalist's Club and of the Warwickshire Natural History and Archaeological Society, and in 1854 he was chief founder of the Warwickshire Naturalists' and Archaeologists' Field Club. In 1887 the Murchison Medal was awarded to him by the Geological Society of London. He died at Rowington, Warwickshire on 1 November 1897.
