= Dead Maid Quarry =

Site of Special Scientific Interest in Wiltshire, England

Coordinates: 51.09057°N 2.28267°W

Dead Maid Quarry (grid reference ST803324) is a 4,400 square metre geological Site of Special Scientific Interest in Mere, Wiltshire, England, notified in 1951. It lies in an area of industrial buildings off Castle Street on the south west outskirts of the town and provides a section of strata from the Cenomanian age, bearing many fossils.

== Sources ==
- Natural England citation sheet for the site (accessed 24 March 2022)
