= Goldborough Farm Meadows =

Protected area in Wiltshire, England

Coordinates: 51.51886°N 1.87745°W

Goldborough Farm Meadows (grid reference SU086800) is a 10.32 hectare biological Site of Special Scientific Interest in Wiltshire, England.

== Sources ==
- Natural England citation sheet for the site (accessed 1 April 2022)
