= Dinton Railway Cutting =

Protected area in Wiltshire, England

Coordinates: 51.07742°N 1.98996°W

Dinton Railway Cutting (grid reference SU008309) is a 2,600 square metre geological Site of Special Scientific Interest in Wiltshire, notified in 1990.

== Sources ==
- Natural England citation sheet for the site (accessed 24 March 2022)
