= Longleat Woods =

British Forest

- Site of Special Scientific Interest
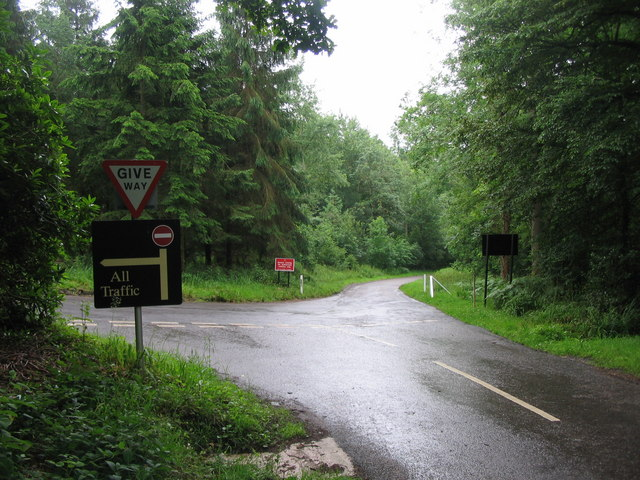

- Location within Somerset
- Location of Longleat Woods.
- Area of search: Somerset
- Grid reference: ST795435
- Coordinates: 51.19035°N 2.29472°W
- Interest: Biological
- Area: 249.9 hectares (2.499 km^{2}; 0.965 sq mi)
- Notification date: 1972

Longleat Woods (grid reference ST795435) is a 249.9 hectare (617.4 acre) biological Site of Special Scientific Interest south of Frome in Somerset, notified in 1972.

This site includes the Ashen Copse Nature Conservation Review site. This site is a large, ancient, semi-natural, broadleaved woodland with a predominantly high forest structure which is unusual in South West Britain. Over the majority of the site, where soils are poorly drained but not waterlogged, the major canopy-forming tree is pedunculate oak (Quercus robur), with ash (Fraxinus excelsior) being locally common and distributed throughout. Hazel (Corylus avellana) is the commonest shrub and occurs throughout. Many plant species normally found only in ancient woodlands occur, including broad-leaved helleborine (Epipactis helleborine) and wood small-reed (Calamagrostis epigejos). One of the largest plantations of coast redwoods (sequoia sempervirens) in Britain is also located here, mostly within the grounds of Center Parcs Longleat. These grounds are also home to the U.K.'s tallest giant redwood (sequoiadendron giganteum).

The breeding bird community includes woodcock (Scolopax rusticola), tree pipit (Anthus trivialis), wood warbler (Phylloscopus sibilatrix), common redstart (Phoenicurus phoenicurus), common buzzard (Buteo buteo), tawny owl (Strix aluco), greater spotted woodpecker (Dendrocopos major), lesser spotted woodpecker (Dendrocopos minor) and European green woodpecker (Picus viridis). The breeding invertebrates include white admiral (Ladoga camilla), silver-washed fritillary (Argynnis paphia) and small pearl-bordered fritillary (Boloria selene) butterflies and hornets (Vespa crabro).
