= Sutton Lane Meadows =

Protected area in Wiltshire, England

Coordinates: 51.49821°N 2.07918°W

Sutton Lane Meadows (grid reference ST946777) is a 3.44 hectare biological Site of Special Scientific Interest in Wiltshire, notified in 1988.

== Sources ==
- Natural England citation sheet for the site (accessed 25 May 2023)
