= Hang Wood =

Protected area in Wiltshire, England

Coordinates: 51.08624°N 2.19983°W

Hang Wood (grid reference ST861319) is a 20.3 hectare biological Site of Special Scientific Interest in Wiltshire, notified in 1986.

== Sources ==
- Natural England citation sheet for the site (accessed 1 April 2022)
