= King's Play Hill =

Hill in Wiltshire, England

Coordinates: 51.39124°N 1.99276°W

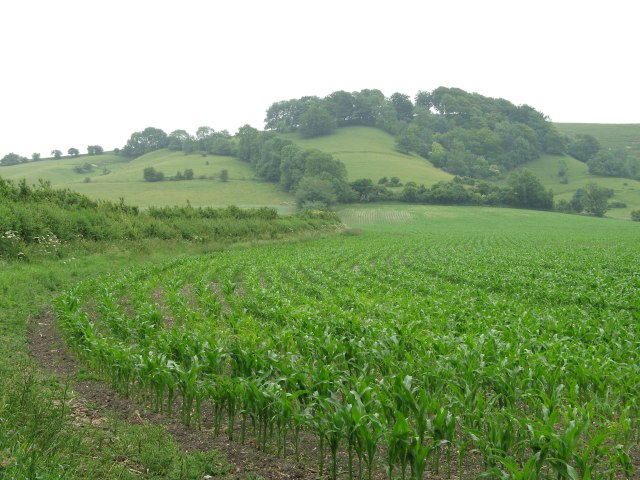
King's Play Hill

King's Play Hill (grid reference SU006658) is a 29.5 hectare biological Site of Special Scientific Interest near Heddington, Wiltshire, notified in 1971.

== Sources ==
- Natural England citation sheet for the site (accessed 7 April 2022)
