= Midford Valley Woods =

Woods in Wiltshire, England

Coordinates: 51.34851°N 2.33307°W

Midford Valley Woods (grid reference ST769611) is a 60-acre (24.6-hectare) biological Site of Special Scientific Interest between Midford and Limpley Stoke in Wiltshire, England, notified in 1975.

== Sources ==
- Natural England citation sheet for the site (accessed 7 April 2022)
