= Great Yews =

Protected area in Wiltshire, England

Coordinates: 51.00716°N 1.83034°W

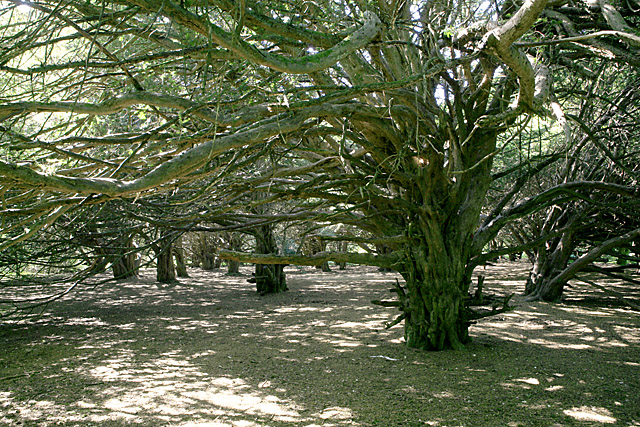
Yew trees at Great Yews

Great Yews (grid reference SU120231) is a 29.3 hectare biological Site of Special Scientific Interest in Wiltshire, notified in 1951.

== Sources ==
- Natural England citation sheet for the site (accessed 1 April 2022)
