= Stanton St. Quintin Quarry and Motorway Cutting =

Geological Site of Special Scientific Interest in Wiltshire, England

Coordinates: 51.51526°N 2.11956°W

Stanton St. Quintin Quarry & Motorway Cutting (grid reference ST918796) is a 2.2 hectare geological Site of Special Scientific Interest southeast of Stanton St Quintin in Wiltshire, England, notified in 1971.

== Sources ==
- Natural England citation sheet for the site (accessed 25 May 2023)
