= Botley Down =

Biological Site of Special Scientific Interest in Wiltshire, England

Coordinates: 51.33655°N 1.58222°W

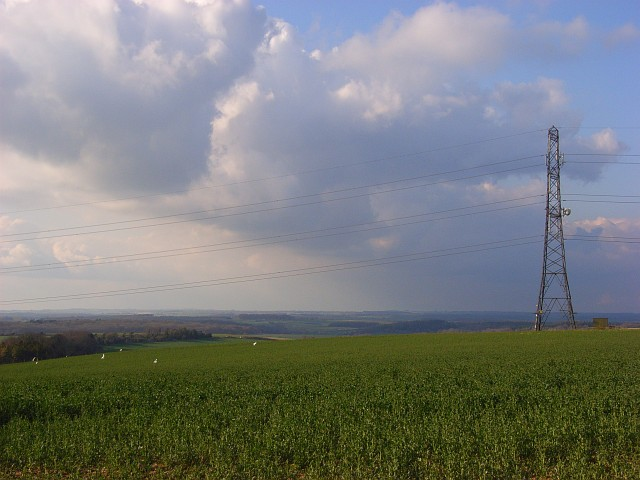
Botley Down A crop of oil-seed rape on a gentle gradient above the escarpment. The white specks are bird-scarers.

Botley Down (grid reference SU292598) is a biological Site of Special Scientific Interest in Wiltshire, notified in 1989.

== Sources ==
- Natural England citation sheet for the site (accessed 22 March 2022)
