= Seend Cleeve =

Hamlet in Wiltshire, England

Coordinates: 51.348°N 2.101°W

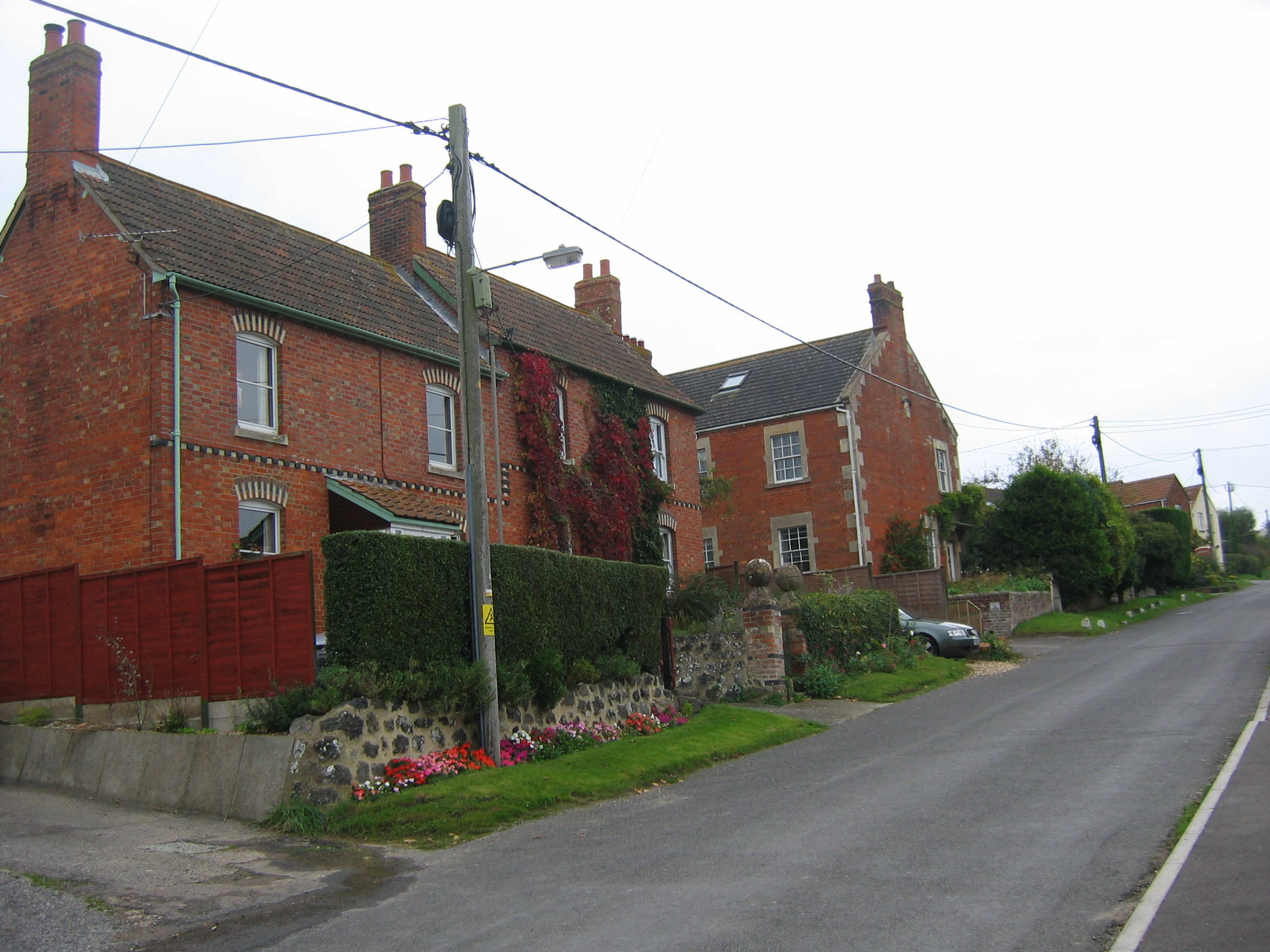
- Main road of Seend Cleeve, with the village's only red telephone box visible in the background

- Location within Wiltshire
- OS grid reference: ST931610
- Civil parish: Seend
- Unitary authority: Wiltshire Council
- Ceremonial county: Wiltshire
- Region: South West
- Country: England
- Sovereign state: United Kingdom
- Post town: Melksham
- Postcode district: SN12
- Dialling code: 01380
- Police: Wiltshire
- Fire: Dorset and Wiltshire
- Ambulance: South Western
- UK Parliament: Melksham and Devizes
- Website: Parish Council

Seend Cleeve is a large hamlet or sub-village immediately west of Seend in Wiltshire, England. It lies about 2.3 miles (3.7 km) southeast of the town of Melksham.

A Primitive Methodist chapel with Sunday school was built in 1841 at Seend Cleeve. In 1849, the chapel was rebuilt in red brick with ashlar quoins. The chapel closed in 1979 and was converted into a private house in 2012.

Seend Cleeve Quarry was a source of brown haematite; since 1987 the quarry has been a Geological Site of Special Scientific Interest. There was an ironworks in the second half of the 19th century, and quarrying continued until 1946.

Seend Cleeve has two public houses: the Barge Inn on the Kennet and Avon Canal, and the Brewery Inn.
