= Loosehanger Copse and Meadows =

Protected area in Wiltshire, England

Coordinates: 50.9745°N 1.6951°W

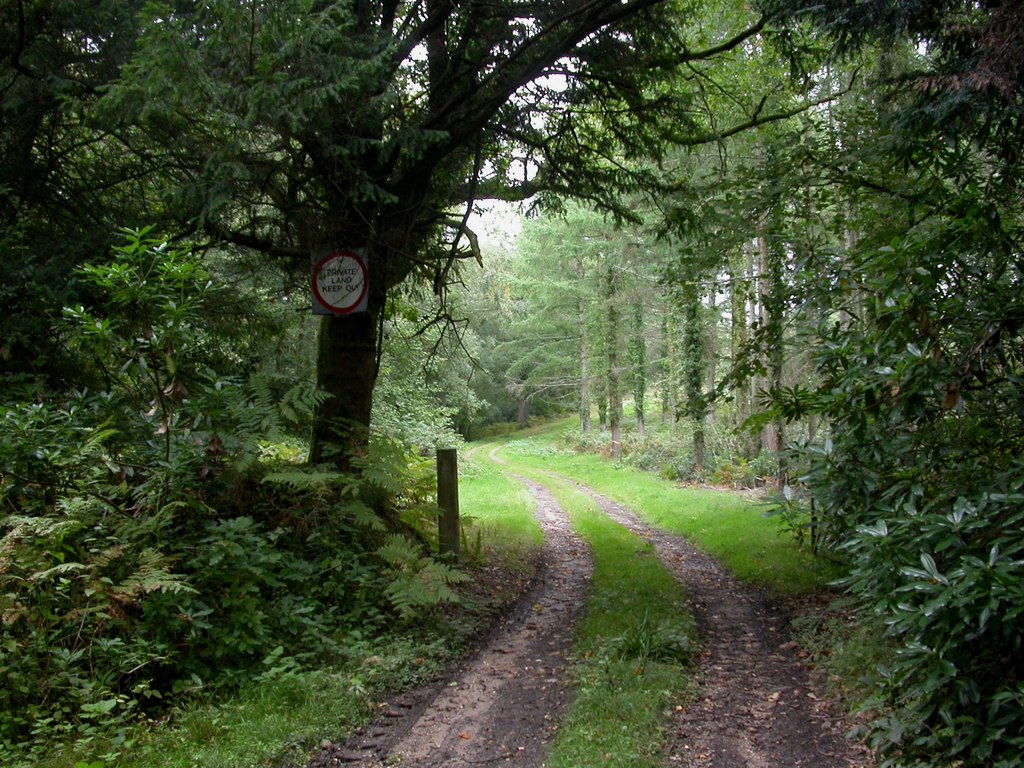
Loosehanger Copse

Loosehanger Copse and Meadows (grid reference SU215195) is a 56.27 hectare biological Site of Special Scientific Interest in Wiltshire, England, notified in 1992.

== Sources ==
- Natural England citation sheet for the site (accessed 7 April 2022)
