= Stert Brook Exposure =

Geological site in Wiltshire, England

Coordinates: 51.324°N 1.977°W

Stert Brook Exposure (grid reference SU017583) is a 1.0 acre (0.40 ha) geological Site of Special Scientific Interest in Potterne parish in Wiltshire, England, notified in 1989. The site covers both banks of an unnamed brook north of Crookwood Farm, about 2 miles (3.2 km) south of Devizes, and provides a section through marine rocks of the late Jurassic age. It has rock-types from both north Wiltshire / Oxfordshire and south Wiltshire.
