= Out Woods =

Protected area in Wiltshire, England

Coordinates: 51.48540°N 2.24190°W

Out Woods (grid reference ST833763) is a 14.3 hectare biological Site of Special Scientific Interest in Wiltshire, notified in 1975. It is an ancient Ash-Maple woodland noted for containing rare species of ground flora.

== Sources ==
- Natural England citation sheet for the site (accessed 21 March 2021)
