= West Yatton Down =

Protected area in Wiltshire, England

Coordinates: 51.48276°N 2.21452°W

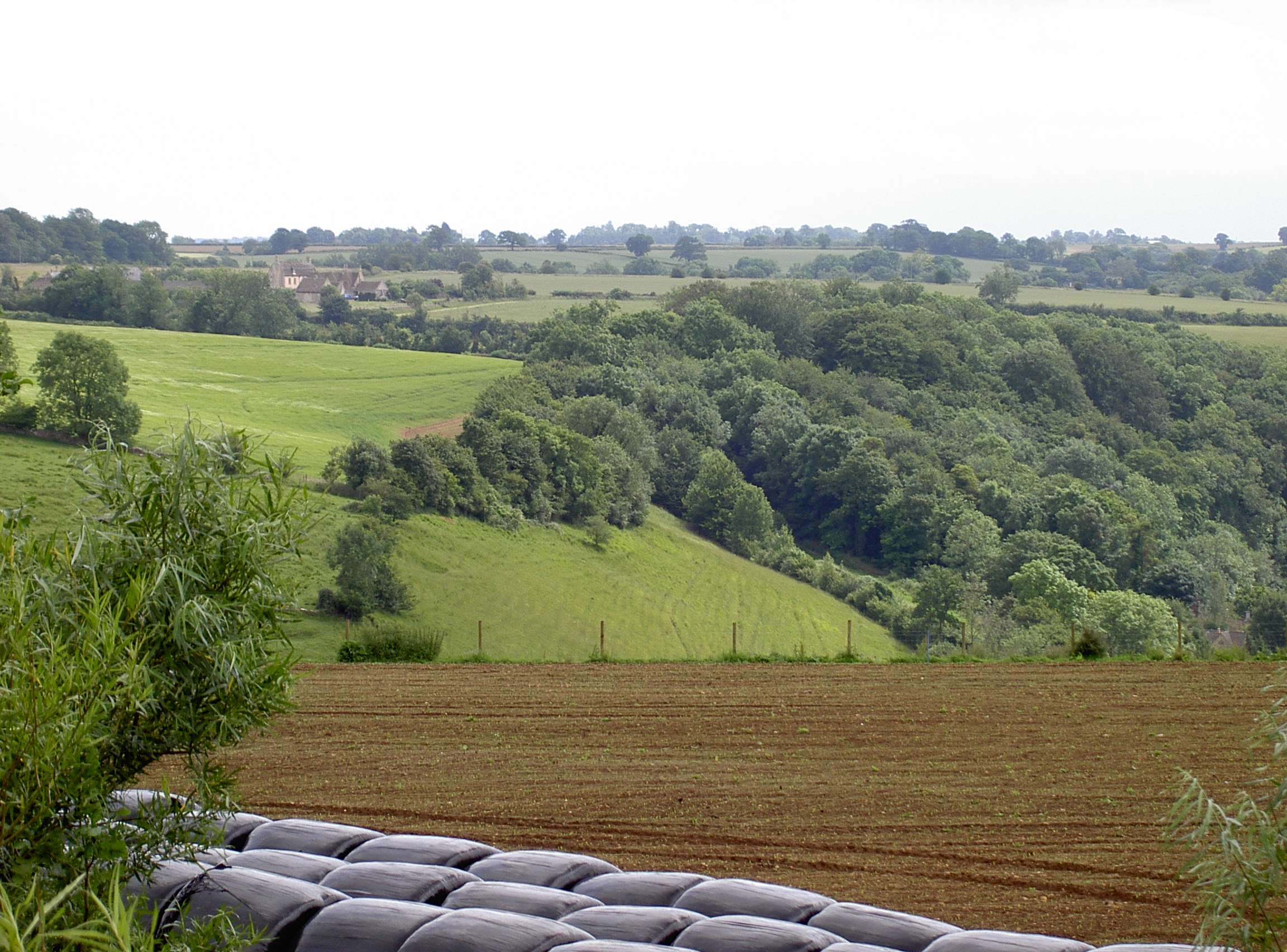
West Yatton Down in June 2007

West Yatton Down (grid reference ST852760) is a 14.4 hectare biological Site of Special Scientific Interest in Wiltshire, notified in 1971.

The site is an example of unimproved limestone grassland. Among the more notable plants species are bastard-toadflax (Thesium humifusum), Dyer's greenweed (Genista tinctoria), and musk orchid (Herminium monorchis). Other species present include yellow-wort (Blackstonia perfoliata), kidney vetch (Anthyllis vulneraria), devil's-bit scabious (Succisa pratensis), bee orchid (Ophrys apifera), tor-grass (Brachypodium pinnatum) and upright brome (Bromus erectus).

The site is also of interest for invertebrates. Twenty-five butterfly species have been recorded, including chalkhill blue, Duke of Burgundy, pearl-bordered fritillary and green hairstreak.

== Sources ==
- Natural England citation sheet for the site (accessed 25 May 2023)
