= Old Town Railway Cutting, Swindon =

Protected area in Swindon, England

Coordinates: 51.54749°N 1.78075°W

Old Town Railway Cutting (grid reference SU153832) is a 1.78-hectare (4.4-acre) geological Site of Special Scientific Interest in Swindon, Wiltshire, notified in 1975. It is near the site of the former Swindon Town railway station.

The site is notable for an unusual exposure of the Kimmeridge Clay formation.

== Land ownership ==
All land within Old Town Railway Cutting Swindon SSSI is owned by the local authority.

== Sources ==
- Natural England citation sheet for the site (accessed 7 April 2022)
