= Camp Down =

Protected area in Wiltshire, England

Coordinates: 51.10338°N 1.82999°W

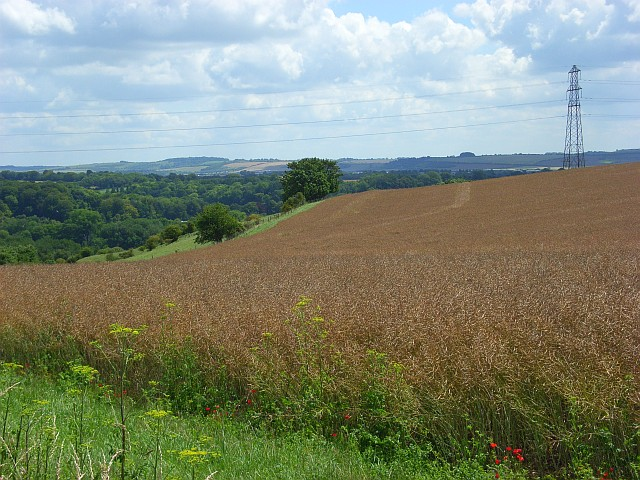
A field of oilseed rape above Camp Down

Camp Down (grid reference SU120338) is a 7.3-hectare (18-acre) biological Site of Special Scientific Interest in Wiltshire in South West England. It was designated as such in 1965.

== Location ==
The area overlooks the valley of the River Avon, and is about 3 miles (5 km) northwest of Salisbury. It lies east of the A360 road, which runs from Salisbury to Devizes via Stonehenge.

== Environment ==
The down has a chalk grassland that has been well grazed and contains numerous plants, as is typical of grass sites in South Wiltshire. Over 20 types of grasses and sedges have been recorded at Camp Down, including red fescue, upright brome, quaking-grass, crested hair-grass and glaucous sedge. The turf contains a variety of herbs, including dwarf thistle and ox-eye daisy. There are a significant number of orchids, particularly Gymnadenia conopsea.

There are a number of young sycamore trees on the site, alongside patches of scrub and scattered bushes. The environment of chalk grassland mixed with scattered scrub means Camp Down is frequented to a number of types of birds and insects. Historical records show there were several types of plant bug and beetle fauna on the site.

Camp Down has seen problems with badgers who are a prominent carrier of tuberculosis. In 2019, Natural England reported that the government would grant a licence for badger culling on the site in the interests of preserving the environment. The action has been controversial, and criticised by the Badger Trust as unnecessarily cruel.
