= Danks Down and Truckle Hill =

Protected area in Wiltshire, England

Coordinates: 51.481°N 2.2397°W

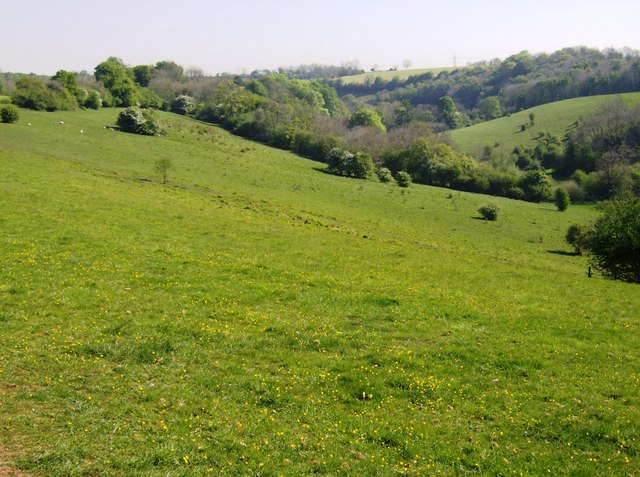
Danks Down, showing a footpath (part of the Macmillan Way) on the left and By Brook in the valley to the right. Long Dean Hamlet in middle-distance.

Danks Down and Truckle Hill (grid reference ST834758) is a 13.1 hectare biological Site of Special Scientific Interest in Wiltshire, notified in 1990.

== Sources ==
- Natural England citation sheet for the site (accessed 24 March 2022)
