= Seend Ironstone Quarry and Road Cutting =

Geological Site of Special Scientific Interest in Wiltshire, England

Coordinates: 51.3480°N 2.0918°W

Seend Ironstone Quarry and Road Cutting (grid reference ST937610) is a 3 acres (1.2 ha) Geological Site of Special Scientific Interest at Seend in Wiltshire, England, notified in 1965. The site contains facies of Lower Greensand containing specimens of fauna not found elsewhere.

Mining rights were leased just below the Bell Inn before 1856 where 10,000 tons of iron ore were mined. The quarried brown hematite ore was then smelted in blast furnaces from 1860 by William Sarl with three furnaces fifty feet high, and employing 300 men. Iron smelting continued intermittently until the mid 1870s, after which only quarrying was carried on. The ironworks were dismantled by 1890. The ironstone continued to be extracted and shipped for smelting elsewhere until after World War I. From around the 1920s the iron ore was calcined at the site for shipping and its iron oxide used in purification plants for town gas. The works appear to have continued functioning into the 1960s.

== History of Seend quarry and iron works ==
=== Early history ===
The antiquarian John Aubrey wrote that he discovered iron ore as early as 1666 when it rained so much that it washed away the sand from the ore and the later bright sun reflected on it. He described the ore field as the richest he had ever seen. The smith could melt the ore in his forge, which wasn't possible with ore from the Forest of Dean. Aubrey says that the oak trees of Melksham forest, which once reached to the foot of the hill, were cut down in about 1634; there was thus not enough wood (for charcoal) to smelt it, and it remained unexploited until the 1850s.

At the 1851 Great Exhibition, there was shown a collection of 500 iron ores made by Samuel Holden Blackwell, iron-master of Dudley. He also paid for a chemical analysis of many the ores (including a sample from Seend) which was published in a work by John Percy of the Royal School of Mines. Early extraction of the ore before 1856 resulted in 4,000 tons being shipped to the Tredegar Iron Company. The ore field underlay 179 acres of land, of which the village of Seend occupied 64.

=== 1856–1870 ===
William Sarl of Cornhill, London, bid for and acquired leases in November 1856 on three parcels of land where the ore was quarried; a tramway was built from the quarry near Seend Cleeve to Seend railway station, and the ore was transported to South Wales and the Black Country for smelting.

Sarl determined to smelt the ore into pig iron on site, and a separate 'Great Western Iron Ore, Smelting, and Coal Company' was formed in 1857 to bring coking coal from Ruabon in North Wales on the Great Western Railway. However, fraudulent speculation over mineral rights in Seend and Ruabon led to the company's bankruptcy with liabilities of £43,000; Sarl re-acquired the site and by the end of January 1860 he had lit the first blast furnace and produced 200 tons of pig iron. The furnace was probably erected by Samuel Blackwell, using James Beaumont Neilson's hot blast method, in a design likely by Martin Baldwin of Bilston Although a blast furnace at nearby Westbury obtained its coke from Newbury Colliery, near Vobster, Sarl seems to have had difficulty finding adequate fuel. He contracted for a supply of coal from the Old Grove colliery near Timsbury, and a coke hearth (a type of open coke oven) was constructed at Seend.

Sarl hoped to expand his operation with more blast furnaces, coke ovens and workers' housing. To raise capital a new enterprise, the Wiltshire Iron Company was formed in June 1861, with Samuel Blackwell as the general manager. The Geological Survey of Great Britain stated in 1920 that 77,984 tons of brown hematite were raised between 1855 and 1861. The 1861 Census shows the influx of a number of workers from outside the area, including men from Ireland and the Black Country to work here. But the venture evidently failed and the company was wound up in 1864, although around 83,000 tons of ore were raised in 1865-66.

=== 1870–1900 ===
A Glasgow firm, Messrs Malcolm and Company, took over in 1870 but was wound up in 1873. Later that year Richard Berridge, a partner in the London Meux Brewery company acquired control of the works, but by 1876 activity at the Seend iron works appears to have ceased. The Geological Survey stated in 1920 that 86,443 tons were quarried from 1871 to 1874. The ironstone quarries continued to be worked intermittently: in 1884 complaints were received that Pelch Lane was being badly cut up by the constant haulage of iron ore down the narrow lane. The iron works are marked as disused on a map published in 1888, and the next year they were dismantled and the machinery sold off. That same year Kelly's Directory stated "Iron ore is found here in abundance and until recently was largely worked."

=== 1905–1946 ===
A firm based at Midsomer Norton, near Radstock, bought the property in 1905 and extracted ore for a number of years, with most of the output going to South Wales. During the First World War, an overhead cable took ore down in large iron buckets to the goods yard at Seend station; boys took free rides up the hill in the empty buckets.

After around 1920, a new purpose was found for the iron ore: iron oxide extracted from the ore was used in gas purification plants to absorb various cyanogen compounds present in coal gas (town gas). The ore was calcined by the 'New Seend ironworks' to remove the earthy residues, and shipped to cities such as London, Liverpool, Birmingham and Swansea. Exploitation was renewed between 1939 and 1945, and in 1953 was carried on by the Westbury and Seend Ore & Oxide Co. Ltd. Iron oxide was also used for making paint. The quarry continued to be worked until the 1960s.

== Iron ore analysis ==
The iron ore quarried at Seend is a limonite (or yellow/brown hematite) belonging to the Lower Cretaceous. This geological layer was formerly well-known for its ores found in Kent and Surrey which had been the basis of the Wealden iron industry since earliest times. But the scarcity of timber to make charcoal for smelting, allied with the introduction of coke in other regions brought an end to production by the late 18th century. The only other ore of the Lower Cretaceous is the Claxby Ironstone, found in Lincolnshire.

An analysis of the Seend ore collected by Samuel Blackwell and shown at the 1851 Great Exhibition includes the following:

"No. 13. The specimen much resembled...the yellowish brown varieties of Northamptonshire ore, and was from the outcrop, where it had been exposed to atmospheric oxidation. It is a highly siliceous, earthy, hydrated sesquioxide of iron [an older term for brown hematite or limonite]"

Blackwell, who was much involved in the Seend quarry and ironworks, had explored the Northampton Sand shortly before the 1851 Exhibition and had discovered an extensive deposit of similar brown hematite which was shipped for smelting to South Staffordshire, Derbyshire and South Wales.

A later analysis of the Seend ironstone by J. D Kendall includes the following remarks:

In Seend the Lower Greensand rests on the Kimmeridge clay. Scattered through the sand are irregular parallel bands of ore-bearing concretions. Many of the concretions have a core of yellow sand of 2.5 to 0.4 mm (0.1 to 0.016 inch) diameter, consisting of silica dusted with 'hydrated peroxide of iron' [perhaps Goethite, FeO(OH), Iron(III) oxide-hydroxide].

== See also ==
- Seend Cleeve Quarry

== Sources ==
- Aubrey, John (1862). Jackson, John Edward (ed.). Wiltshire. The Topographical collections of John Aubrey, 1659-70. Devizes, Wiltshire: Wiltshire Archaeological and Natural History Society.
- Day, Roy (1979). "The Iron Industry in Wiltshire,1856–1939". Bristol Industrial Archaeological Society Journal (12).
- Kendall, J. D. (1893). The Iron Ores of Great Britain and Ireland. London: Crosby Lockwood and Son.
- Percy, John (1864). Metallurgy: Iron and Steel. London: John Murray.
- Chettle, H. F.; Powell, W. R.; Spalding, P. A.; Tillott, P. M. (1953). "Parishes: Melksham". In Pugh, R. B.; Crittall, Elizabeth (eds.). A History of the County of Wiltshire, Volume 7. Victoria County History. University of London. pp. 91–121 – via British History Online.
- Natural England citation sheet for the site (accessed 14 February 2020)
