= Lower Woodford Water Meadows =

Site of Specific Scientific Interest in Wiltshire, England

Coordinates: 51.11146°N 1.82424°W

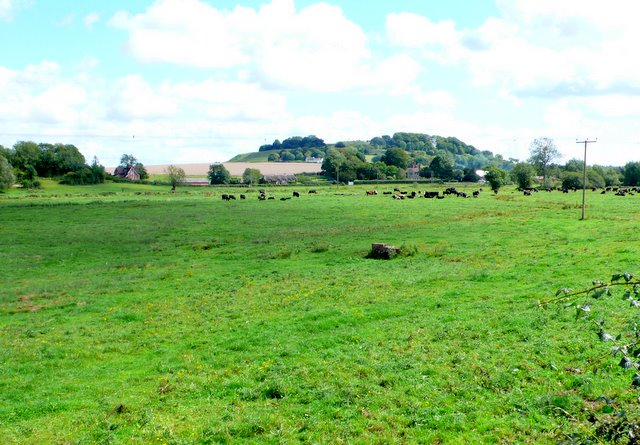
The old water meadows with the remains of brickwork and irrigation channels

Lower Woodford Water Meadows (grid reference SU124347) is a 23.9 hectare biological Site of Special Scientific Interest in Wiltshire, notified in 1971.

== Sources ==
- Natural England citation sheet for the site (accessed 7 April 2022)
