= Cotswold Water Park =

Lake system and park in England

Coordinates: 51°39′07″N 1°57′27″W

Location in Gloucestershire and Wiltshire

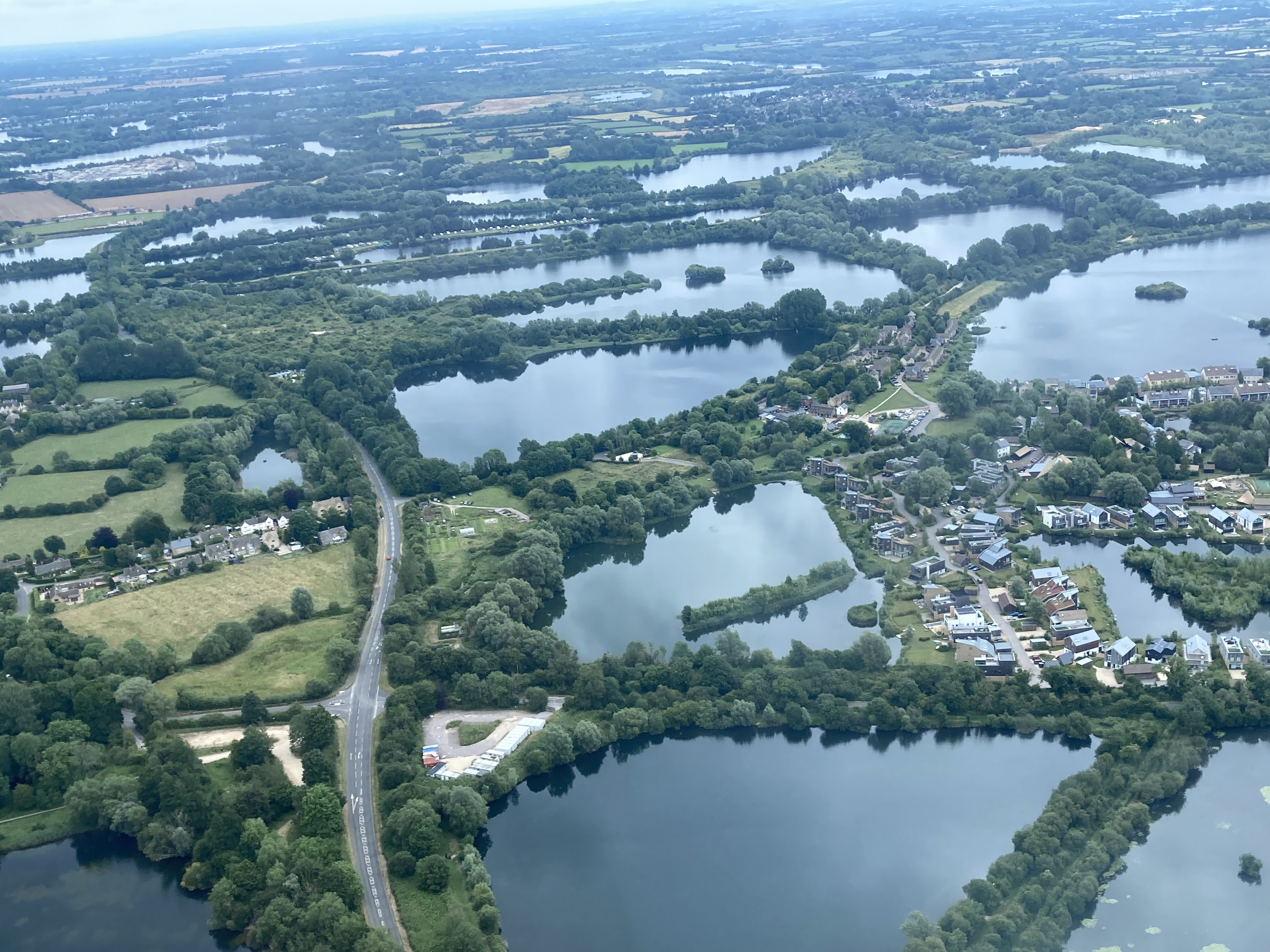
Cotswold Lakes from the air

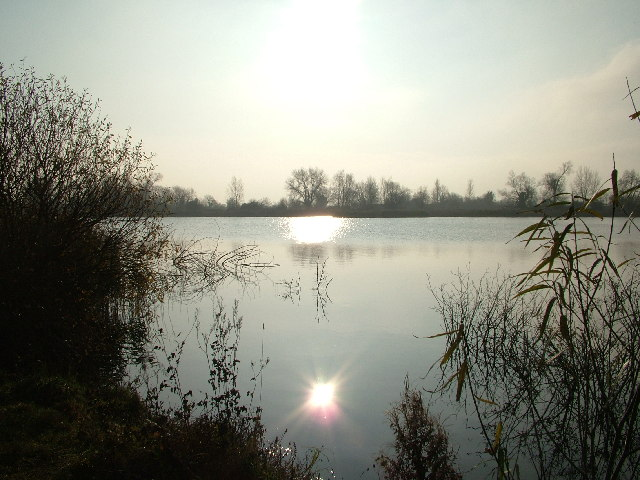
A lake at the Cotswold Lakes

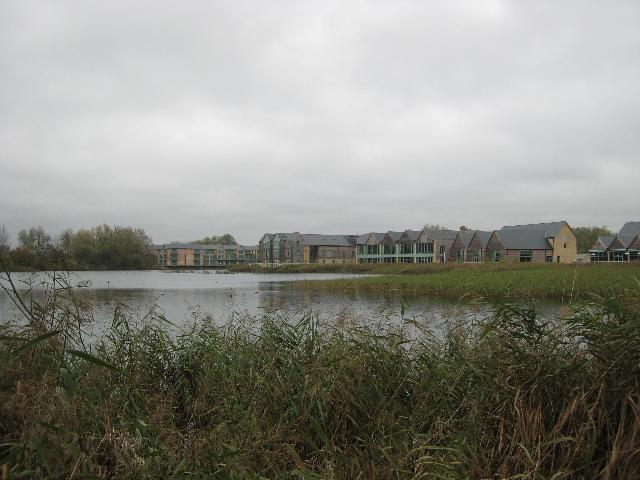
Lakeside holiday accommodation

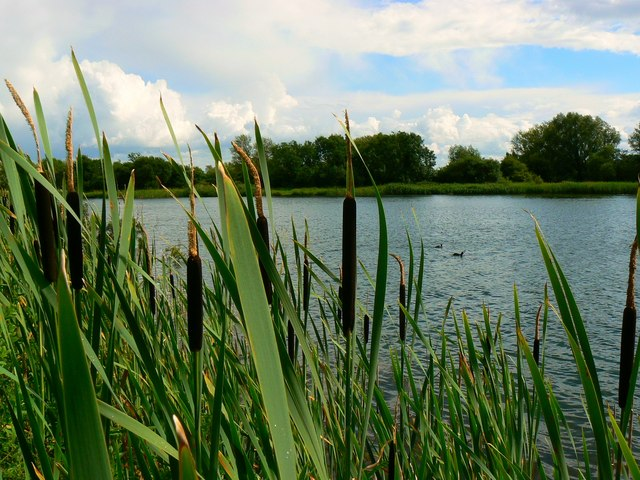
Bulrushes and coots on one of the lakes

The Cotswold Lakes (formerly known as Cotswold Water Park) is the United Kingdom's largest marl lake system, straddling the Wiltshire–Gloucestershire border, north-west of Cricklade and south of Cirencester. There are 180 lakes, spread over 42 square miles (110 km^{2}).

The park is a mix of nature conservation activities, including nature reserves; recreation, including sailing, fishing, a country park and beach with water sports and play areas; rural villages; and holiday accommodation. It is a significant area for wildlife and particularly for wintering and breeding birds. The local wildlife trusts (Gloucestershire and Wiltshire) are involved in partnership with the Cotswold Lakes Trust charity in working with local communities and organisations in the area.

== History ==
The lakes were created in the second half of the 20th century by extraction of glacial Jurassic limestone gravel, which had eroded from the Cotswold Hills, and these filled naturally from rivers and streams after workings began to be exhausted in the early 1970s.

Prior to the establishment of the Cotswold Water Park Trust, certain elements of, or activities within the area were overseen by the Cotswold Water Park Society Limited. The Society's chief executive of the time, Dennis Grant, was imprisoned in 2011 for defrauding the organisation of more than £650,000, and the trust was subsequently relaunched as a registered charity working for the benefit of people and wildlife in the area.

In 2021, the name of the charity changed from Cotswold Water Park Trust to Cotswold Lakes Trust. In 2024, a steering group of local business owners, in collaboration with the Cotswold Lakes Trust, proposed the renaming of the region from Cotswold Water Park to Cotswold Lakes. This idea quickly gained traction, receiving backing from various operators and parish councils. On 31 July 2024, Cotswold District Councillors passed a motion to support the name change.

== Location ==
Information may be found in detailed maps of locations and facilities, the Local Biodiversity Action Plan and other publications produced by the Cotswold Lakes Trust.

It is that part of the Upper Thames catchment in North Wiltshire and south Gloucestershire which has been subjected to over 50 years of sand and gravel extraction. For ease of orientation, the Cotswold Lakes is split into three areas.

- The western section encompasses the villages of South Cerney, Cerney Wick, Ashton Keynes, Somerford Keynes, Poole Keynes, Siddington, Oaksey, Minety and Leigh; and includes the uppermost reaches of the River Thames, as well as its tributaries including the River Churn, Swill Brook and Cerney Wick Brook.
- The central section encompasses Driffield, Ampney St Peter, Poulton, Down Ampney, Meysey Hampton, Cricklade, Latton and Marston Meysey; and features further Thames tributaries such as the Ampney Brook. Gravel extraction in the Latton area in the 1990s created additional lakes.
- The eastern section includes Fairford, Kempsford, Lechlade, Buscot, Inglesham and Castle Eaton; and features additional Thames tributaries including the River Coln and River Leach. Lechlade in the eastern section marks the start of the navigable River Thames.

The Cotswold Lakes area sits low in an historic river valley and as such is exposed to fluctuations in ground water levels. Much of the farmland in this area is made up of flood meadows which take up water from the River Thames. Many of the lakes are connected by underground culverts, allowing transfer of water between them. There is also transfer of water through ground water feeds and via a myriad of ditches and streams. Restoration schemes for many of the active mineral workings are taking into account the vital function of these flood water storage areas, as well as creating an important habitat for a number of Local and UK Biodiversity Action Plan species (LBAP and UKBAP).

== Cotswold Lakes Trust nature reserves ==
The Cotswold Lakes Trust (formerly the Cotswold Water Park Trust) is a registered charity. It owns, leases or manages a number of sites within the area, and all are managed for a combination of conservation, public access, education and amenity. All these sites are important refuges and breeding grounds for several species of bats, dragonflies, damselflies, birds, mammals, fish, butterflies and other invertebrates. The Cotswold Lakes has its own Local Biodiversity Action Plan (LBAP) which targets many species or species groups, and habitat types for conservation priority. Management of all CWPT reserves incorporates requirements for these priority species and habitats, and serves to enhance and protect their sustainability. Regular surveys and monitoring are carried out by Trust staff and volunteers, and results fed into the national biodiversity reporting framework.

=== Cleveland Lakes Reserve ===
Cleveland Lakes Reserve is made up of two of the Cotswold Lakes larger lakes (Lake 68a/b and Lake 74) as well as the Waterhay Reedbed (Lake 68c/d). It includes 2.5 km (1.6 miles) of permissive footpath and cycleway as well as three bird viewing hides, and is an important site for breeding and wintering birds such as Eurasian coot, great crested grebe, gadwall, tufted duck, little egret and grey heron. New reedbeds have been created at the eastern end of the reserve, and the associated reed hide allows views across the reedbed to the wooded heronry. Additional wildlife species of note for this reserve include European otter and water vole.

=== Coke's Pit Lake (Local Nature Reserve) ===
Coke's Pit Lake (grid reference SU027953) is a 3.2-hectare (7.9-acre) site. It was excavated 40 years ago, was given to the Cotswold Water Park Trust in 2002 and was declared a Local Nature Reserve (LNR) in 2003. It is about half a mile (0.8 km) east of Somerford Keynes. The reserve was one of the oldest gravel workings in the upper Thames Valley. The extraction of the First Terrace Pleistocene gravels left behind an unusually deep lake, which is sealed by beds of Kellaway clay.

It is a breeding site for birds including reed bunting, tufted duck, black-headed gull and great crested grebe. Water vole, water shrew and nightingale and large numbers of dragonflies are recorded for the site.

=== Elmlea Meadows (SSSI) ===
Elmlea Meadows is a Site of Special Scientific Interest. The designation recognised the nationally scarce downy-fruited sedge (Carex tomentosa) and snake's head fritillary.

=== Old Railway Line ===
The old railway line (previously Midland and South Western Junction Railway) is a wildlife corridor between South Cerney and Cricklade.

=== Shorncote Reedbed ===
Shorncote Reedbed is at the north-east corner, towards South Cerney (Lakes 84 and 85). It is designed to attract wetland birds, and has several linear islands which maximise the area of available reed fringe. Bittern, reed bunting, water rail, common snipe and reed warbler are recorded as visiting this refuge. There have also been sightings of otter and water vole. There are two bird hides. The footpath to the reserve from South Cerney is subject to frequent flooding from the adjacent Cerney Wick Brook and rising ground waters.

=== Waterhay Reedbeds ===
A silt lagoon was formed by the mineral workings that created the Cleveland Lakes. This is now colonised and provides a suitable habitat for wintering and breeding birds and a refuge for reptiles and mammals.

== Designations ==
The site (Fairford Region; South Cerney Region; Coke's Pit Lake; Edward Richardson and Phyllis Amey reserve; Bryworth Lane reserve) was listed in the Cotswold District Local Plan 2001–2011 as a Key Wildlife Site (KWS).

Cotswold Lakes
- Site of Special Scientific Interest
- Location of Cotswold Lakes.
- Area of search: Gloucestershire and Wiltshire
- Grid reference: SU0093 to SU2099
- Interest: Biological
- Area: 135 ha (330 acres)
- Notification date: 1994

Only a few of the lakes are accessible for public use. It is a 135-hectare (330-acre) site of Site of Special Scientific Interest notified in 1994.

- Natural England information on the citation
- Natural England information on the Cotswold Lakes Site

In January 2021, further areas were given SSSI status and a consultation begun on further extending the area covered.

== Gloucestershire Wildlife Trust reserves ==
The Gloucestershire Wildlife Trust activities are based in the eastern section of the Cotswold Lakes. There are four nature reserves called Whelford Pools, Edward Richardson & Phyllis Amey, Roundhouse Lake and Bryworth Lane.

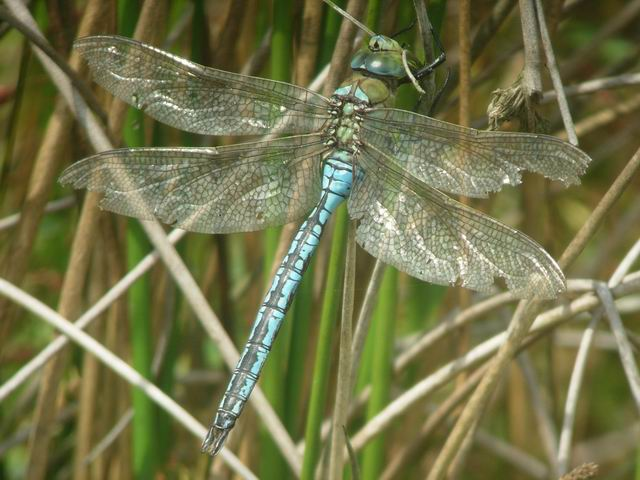
Example: emperor dragonfly (Anax imperator)

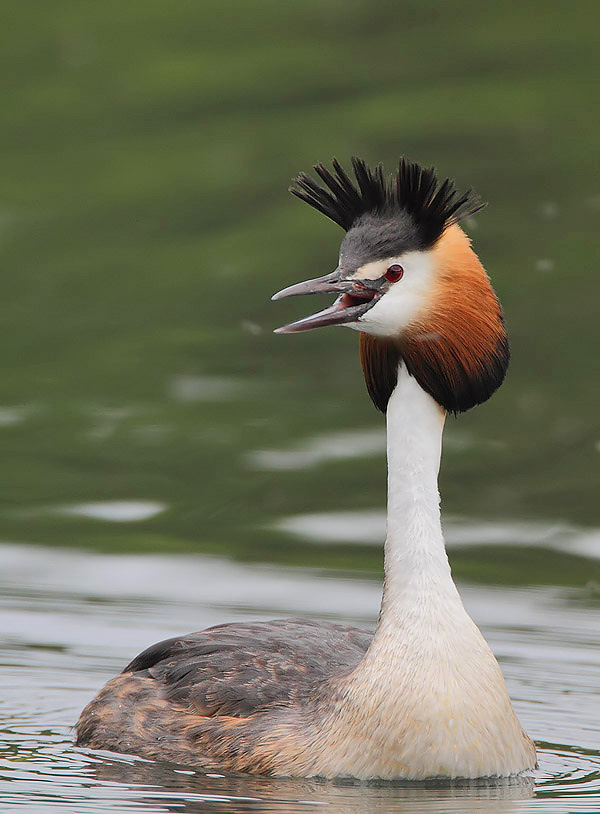
Example: great crested grebe

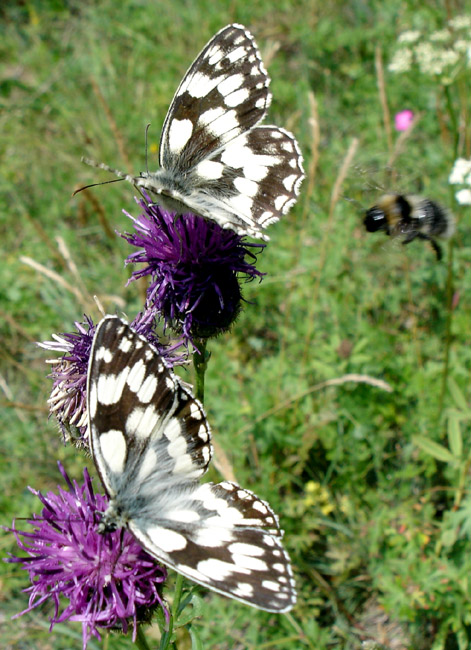
Example: marbled white on knapweed

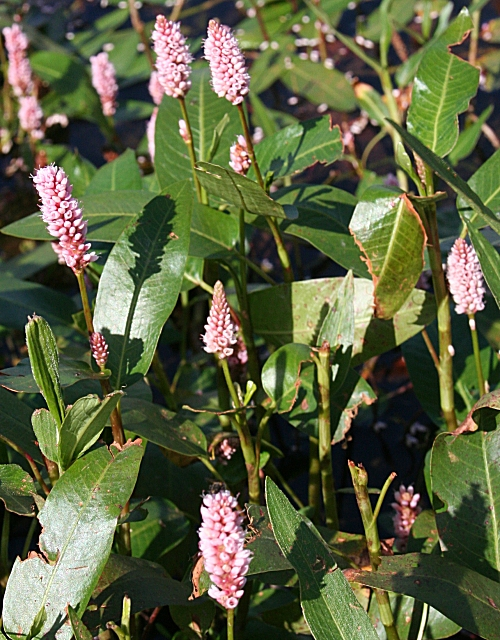
Example: amphibious bistort

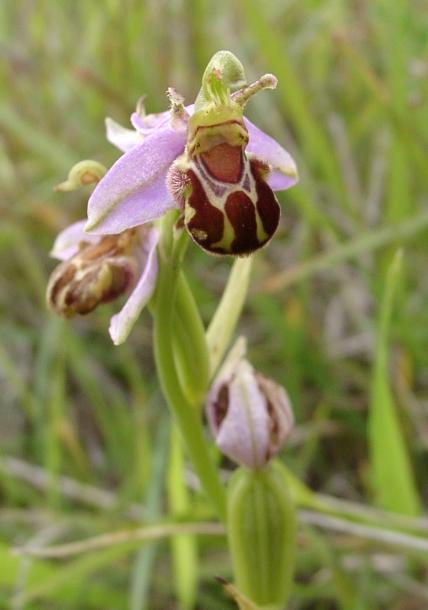
Example: bee orchid (Ophrys apifera)

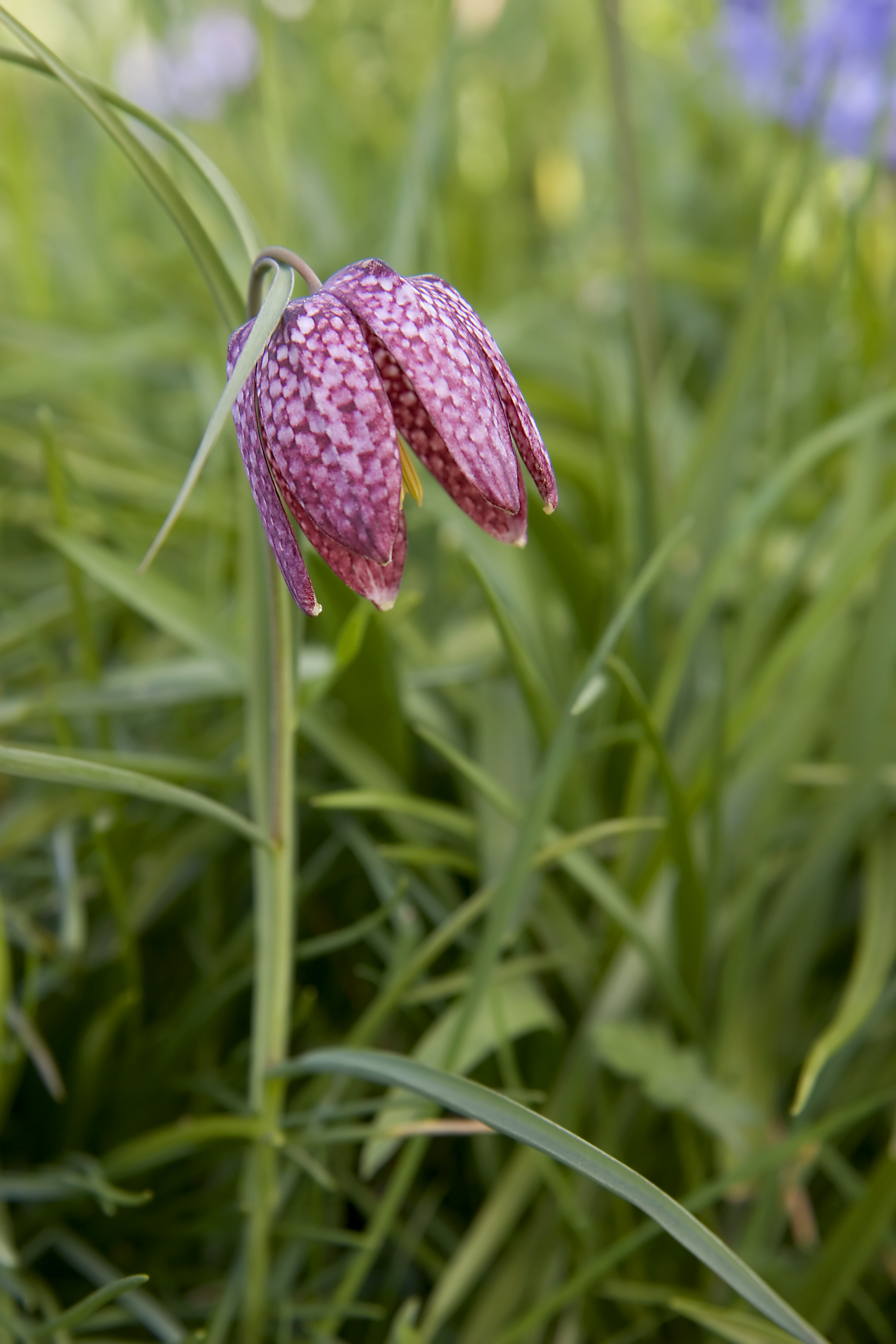
Example: snakeshead fritillary (Fritillaria meleagris)

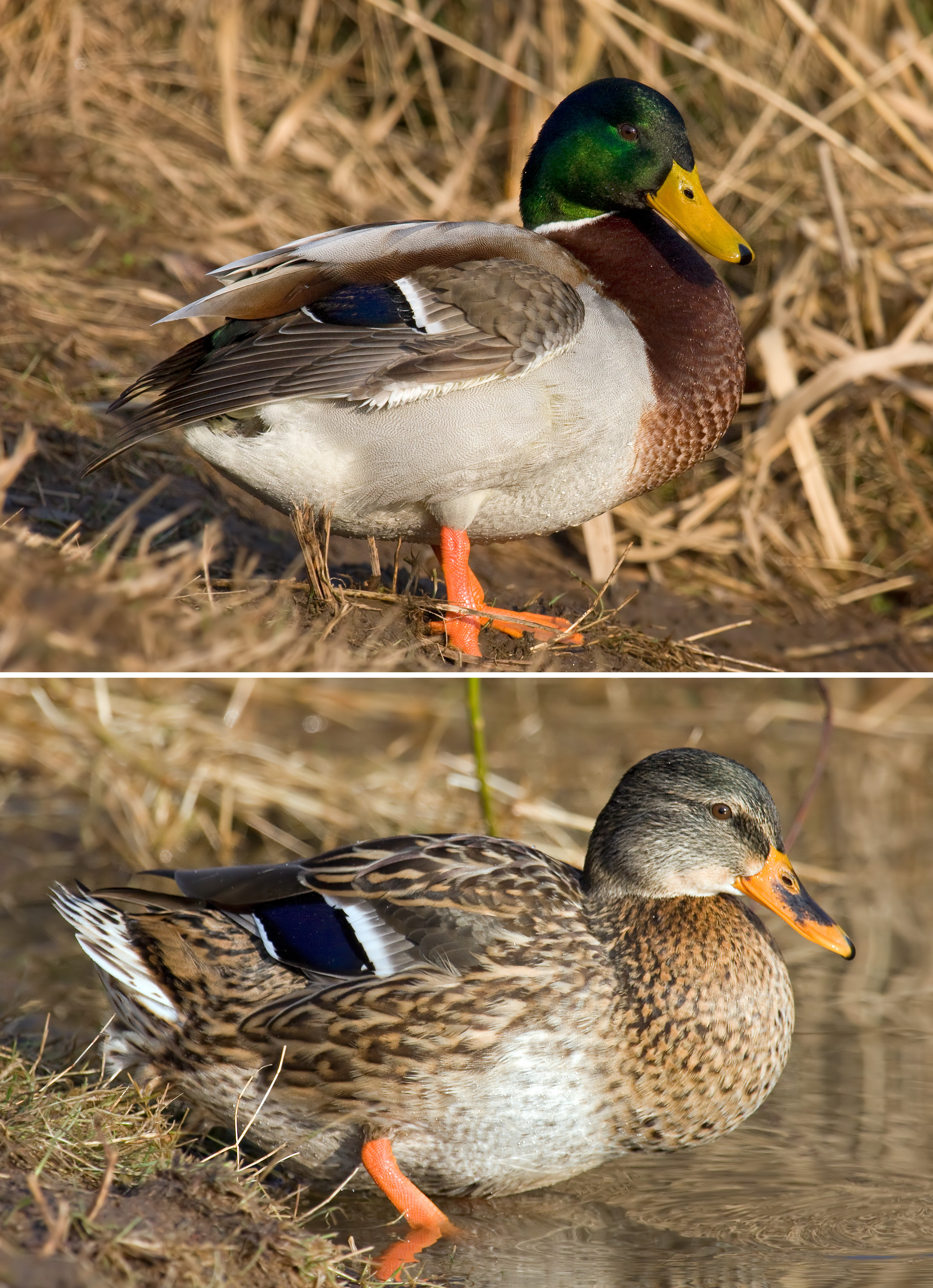
Example: male and female mallard

=== Whelford Pools reserve (SSSI) ===
- Natural England Unit 8 of the Cotswold Lakes, the 8-hectare (20-acre) Whelford Pool (most northerly)
- Natural England Unit 9 of the Cotswold Lakes, the 6-hectare (15-acre) Whelford Pool

The Pools (grid reference SU175995) and (grid reference SU176993) are in the eastern section of the park, between Fairford and Lechlade. The site was purchased by the Gloucestershire Wildlife Trust in 1979 with grant aid from the Worldwide Fund for Nature (WWF). The pools are separated by a narrow bund, and drain south towards the River Coln and the River Thames. The Court Brook is the northern boundary.

The reserve is important for its wintering wildfowl, though also of interest are breeding birds, dragonflies, freshwater molluscs and plants. There are good numbers reported of tufted duck, pochard, coot, mallard and Canada geese wintering on the site. Also present are great crested grebe, mute swan and shoveler. Red-crested pochard and ruddy duck are occasional visitors. The site is a breeding area for tufted duck and great crested grebe along with kingfisher, reed bunting and sedge warbler.

There are two main lakes and three small pools frequented by dragonflies. The emperor dragonfly, migrant hawker, black-tailed skimmer and red-eyed damselfly are amongst other breeding species. Freshwater molluscs are represented and the site is the only known one in Gloucestershire for the tiny 'pea mussel'.

=== Edward Richardson and Phyllis Amey reserve ===
The Edward Richardson and Phyllis Amey reserve (grid reference SP215007) is an 11.1-hectare (27-acre) site. There is a 5.4-hectare (13-acre) gravel pit south of the by-pass and a 5.7-hectare (14-acre) gravel pit north of the by-pass. The site is named after the late site manager and the sister of the former Amey Roadstone Corporation chairman.

The two pits are leased from ARC Properties Ltd. The southern pit has been leased since 1970 and the northern pit since 1972. The pits were created by the extraction of Oolitic gravel, the lakes are bedded by Oxford clay. The depth of the water fluctuates throughout the year and the pools are unusually shallow for water park pits. A nature trail around the southern site allows viewing of the different habitats. There is no public access to the northern pit but wildfowl may be viewed from a hide next to the by-pass. There are a number of seasonal ponds and a wide variety of mature natural habitats have grown up around the edges including scrub, wet woodland, marsh, and reedbed.

The pits are colonised by a rich flora. In the southern site grassland plants include southern marsh-orchid, bee orchid, common fleabane, field scabious and parasitic knapweed broomrape. Marshland plants include tufted forget-me-not, water mint, pink water-speedwell, common spike-rush, amphibious bistort and the rare greater tussock-sedge.

A relatively large number of species of dragonfly and damselfly are recorded, as well as good populations of southern aeshna, common sympetrum and common blue damselfly. The emperor dragonfly visits occasionally. Patches of nettle and thistle attract many butterflies and teasel attracts brimstones and encourages goldfinches.

The site is of interest to birdwatchers throughout the year. Resident birds include common moorhens, Eurasian coots, mallards, great crested grebes and tufted ducks and herons fish the northern lake. Scrub and willow carr provide nesting sites for sedge warblers, whitethroats, Eurasian wrens and common chaffinches. Common house martins and common swifts feed on the abundant insect life. Common kingfishers breed in the northern area. In winter brambling, fieldfare, Eurasian wigeon, gadwall, pochard and Eurasian teal may be sighted.

Great crested newts, frogs and toads breed in the ponds.

=== Roundhouse Lake reserve (SSSI) ===
- Natural England Unit 10 of the Cotswold Water Park, Roundhouse Lake

Roundhouse lake is a 17-hectare (42-acre) site. It is a large open body of water and supports a large number of wintering wildfowl, including wigeon, red-crested pochard, goldeneye, pochard and tufted duck. Great crested grebe and little grebe are frequent visitors and kingfisher sightings reported. Birds may be viewed from a hide. Eurasian otters are reported to visit the lake regularly.

=== Bryworth Lane reserve ===
The Bryworth Lane reserve (grid reference SP200007) is a 0.6-hectare (1.5-acre) site between Lechlade and Fairford to the west of the minor road to Southrop. It is a 300-yard stretch of disused railway and was purchased from the British Railways Property Board in 1990. It was part of a 25-mile-long (40 km) branch line from Oxford, which was opened in 1873. This line extended beyond Fairford to provide a through route to Cheltenham. The line ran along the southern boundary of the Edward Richardson and Phyllis Amey reserve and was closed in the early 1960s.

The track bed has disappeared under arable land, but this stretch remains as a haven for wildlife. It is raised above the adjacent fields, and has been colonised by a wide range of plants native to grassland, scrub, and woodland.

The grassland flora is made up of a wide range of limestone-loving plants which include field scabious, lady's bedstraw, common bird's-foot-trefoil and oxeye daisy. Various colour-forms of greater knapweed may be found as well as common twayblade. Cowslips bloom in the spring. White campion, common toadflax and mouse-ear hawkweed are also supported. Common cornsalad may also be found which is becoming increasingly rare.

There are thickets of bramble, hawthorn, blackthorn, dogwood, goat willow, buckthorn and dog-rose. Woodland comprises birch and pedunculate oak.

The reserve supports butterflies such as brown argus, small copper, marbled white and purple hairstreak; some 21 species have been recorded. The scrub is a shelter area for nest sites for various birds, and a hunting ground for Eurasian sparrowhawks.

== Wiltshire Wildlife Trust reserves ==
There are three reserves in the Cotswold Water Park and the adjacent area which have SSSI status attached to them. These are Clattinger Farm, Mallard Lake (Lower Moor Farm) and Upper Waterhay.

=== Clattinger Farm reserve (SSSI) ===
- Natural England citation and map information for Clattinger Farm
- Natural England unit details for Clattinger Farm

Clattinger Farm (grid reference SU017937) is a 60.33-hectare (149.1-acre) site near Malmesbury. It is not within the Cotswold Water Park SSSI definitions, but a separate SSSI adjacent to the park. It is a prime example of enclosed lowland grassland and is a hay meadow of international importance. This land has been farmed traditionally without artificial fertilisers.

=== Mallard Lake reserve (SSSI) (Lower Moor Farm reserve) ===
- Natural England Unit 5 of the Cotswold Water Park, being Mallard Lake (part of Lower Moor Farm)

Mallard Lake (grid reference SU012936) is a 13-hectare (32-acre) site and is part of Lower Moor Farm reserve (grid reference SU008938) which is a 38.35-hectare (94.8-acre) site near Cricklade and Malmesbury. The Lower Moor Farm reserve comprises three lakes, two brooks, ponds and wetland scrapes. These are linked together by ancient hedges, woodland and meadows. The reserve was opened in May 2007 by TRH the Prince of Wales and the Duchess of Cornwall. It provides a 'gateway' to three neighbouring Wiltshire Wildlife Trust reserves: Clattinger Farm, Oaksey Moor Farm Meadow and Sandpool Farm.

=== Upper Waterhay Meadow reserve (SSSI) ===
- Natural England citation and map for Upper Waterhay
- Natural England unit detail for Upper Waterhay Meadow

Upper Waterhay Meadow (grid reference SU068932) is a 2.82-hectare (7.0-acre) site near Cricklade. It is outside the Cotswold Water Park SSSI but is a separately assessed SSSI within the Cotswold Water Park. It provides protection and support for the snake's head fritillary. Example clusters include the more unusual creamy white than the dark purple (see citation reference which includes photograph of cream coloured flowerhead).

== Publications ==
- Kelham, A, Sanderson, J, Doe, J, Edgeley-Smith, M, et al., 1979, 1990, 2002 editions, 'Nature Reserves of the Gloucestershire Trust for Nature Conservation/Gloucestershire Wildlife Trust'
- 1991, 'Plants and Animals of the Edward Richardson and Phyllis Amey Nature Reserve', Gloucestershire Trust for Nature Conservation
- Bell, D V, 1992, ‘Cotswold Water Park – Nature Conservation Review’, Gloucestershire Wildlife Trust
- 2011, 'Nature Reserve Guide', Gloucestershire Wildlife Trust, published to celebrate its 50th anniversary
- 'Nature Reserves in the Cotswold Water Park', (undated), Gloucestershire Wildlife Trust
- 'Whelford Pools Nature Reserve – Superb lake refuge for wetland birds, plants and dragonflies', (undated), Gloucestershire Wildlife Trust
- Budworth, R, 2012, 'Cotswold Water Park Species Check List', Cotswold Water Park Trust
