= Leigh, Wiltshire =

Village in Wiltshire, England

Coordinates: 51.628°N 1.912°W

Leigh
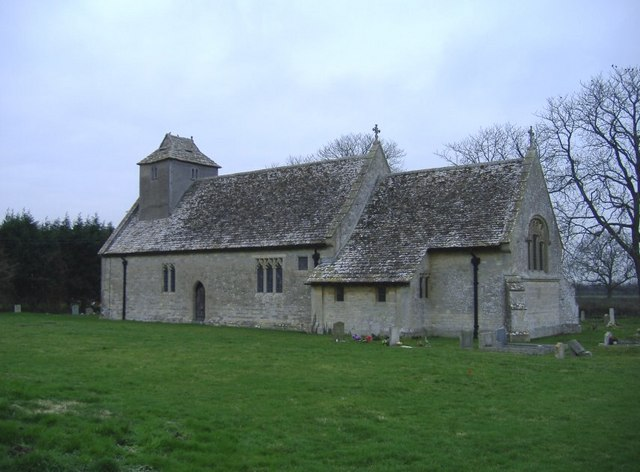
- All Saints Church, Leigh

- Location within Wiltshire
- Population: 353 (2021)
- OS grid reference: SU062921
- Civil parish: Leigh
- Unitary authority: Wiltshire
- Ceremonial county: Wiltshire
- Region: South West
- Country: England
- Sovereign state: United Kingdom
- Post town: Swindon
- Postcode district: SN6
- Dialling code: 01285
- Police: Wiltshire
- Fire: Dorset and Wiltshire
- Ambulance: South Western
- UK Parliament: South Cotswolds
- Website: leigh-village.co.uk

Leigh is a village and civil parish in north Wiltshire, England, 1.5 miles (2.4 km) southeast of Ashton Keynes and 2.5 miles (4 km) west of Cricklade. It is on the edge of the Cotswold Water Park and near to the county border with Gloucestershire. The parish includes the hamlet of Waterhay.

The village lies on a minor road just north of the B4040 Malmesbury–Cricklade road. The infant River Thames forms part of the northern boundary of the parish; near the river is Upper Waterhay Meadow, a biological Site of Special Scientific Interest. Other boundaries are a short section of the Swill Brook which meets the Thames in the northwest; its tributary the Derry Brook in the west; and the Bournlake stream in the east.

== History ==
Farmland at Leigh was part of Ashton Keynes manor, which was held by Cranborne Abbey (Dorset) in 1086; ownership was transferred to Tewkesbury Abbey in 1102. The manor passed to the crown on the dissolution of Tewkesbury in 1539, and in 1548 Edward VI granted the land to William Sharington as a separate manor. The estate was sold in lots by Edward Craggs-Eliot in 1803. The Archers Farm estate was acquired by the Maskelyne family, who sold it to Robert Jenkinson, 2nd Earl of Liverpool. The Jenkinson family retained an interest in Leigh until 1913.

Leigh was a chapelry of Ashton Keynes parish until 1884 when it was made a separate parish. The parish was enlarged in 1984 when farmland south of the Malmesbury road was transferred from Cricklade parish.

The population of the parish peaked in the 19th century, with 326 recorded at the 1871 census. Numbers fell to 264 by 1911, then gradually recovered to earlier levels with 362 recorded in 2011.

A National School was built at Swan Lane in 1894, to accommodate 84 children. Pupils of all ages attended until 1973, when those aged 11 and over transferred to the secondary school at Purton. Leigh school closed in 2004 owing to low pupil numbers.

RAF Blakehill Farm operated from 1944 to 1952 in Cricklade parish, close to Leigh.

== Church ==
The first All Saints Church dated from the 13th century and was at Waterhay, north of the village. In 1896 parts of it were rebuilt by Charles Ponting at a site closer to the village and less prone to flooding. The chancel of the old church still stands; both it and the newer church are Grade II* listed.
