= Pike Corner =

Protected area in Wiltshire, England

Coordinates: 51.638°N 1.949°W

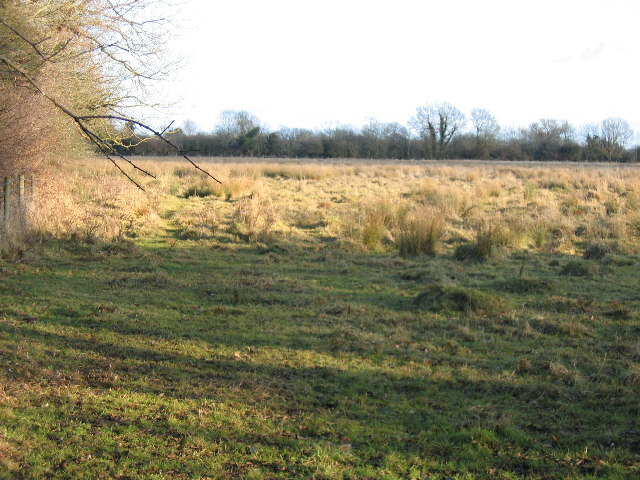
Pike Corner SSSI

Pike Corner (grid reference SU036933) is a 15.2 hectare biological Site of Special Scientific Interest in north Wiltshire, England, notified in 1986. The site lies southwest of Ashton Keynes village and covers two low-lying meadows in the floodplain of the Swill Brook.

For many years the meadows have been grazed without ploughing or the use of artificial fertilisers, therefore they have a rich flora with several meadow species that are now uncommon in southern England.

== Sources ==
- Natural England details and citation sheet for the site (accessed 23 June 2021)
