= Poole Keynes =

Village and civil parish in Gloucestershire, England

Coordinates: 51.658°N 2.001°W

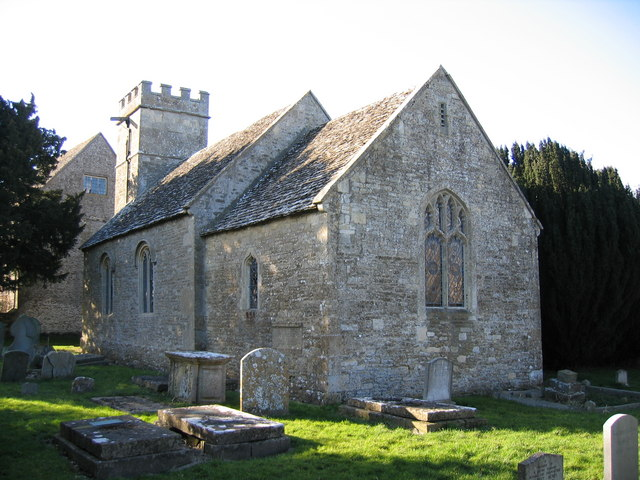
St Michael and All Angels, Poole Keynes

Poole Keynes is a small village and civil parish in the Cotswold District of Gloucestershire, England. The village lies about 4 1/4 miles (7 km) south of the town of Cirencester. At the 2011 Census the population of the parish was 188.

The Church of England parish church of St Michael and All Angels was built c. 1770 on the site of an older church, and restored in 1845. Today the parish is served by the Thameshead benefice, a grouping of six parishes.

The first tier of local government is a parish meeting, which all electors are entitled to attend.

Lakes in the southeast of the parish, formed by gravel extraction, are part of the Cotswold Water Park nature reserve.
