= South Cerney Castle =

Coordinates: 51.677822°N 1.933358°W

South Cerney Castle was an adulterine castle of Motte and bailey construction built in South Cerney, Gloucestershire in the mid-12th century. Today only slight earthwork remains and they are a scheduled monument.

== Description ==
Only slight earthwork remains exist today, although excavations in the middle 1930s revealed a square well and some datable material from the 16th and 17th centuries including farthings from the reign of Charles I. Later, twelfth-century pottery was found on the site.

== History ==
The small Norman castle, built to protect the strategically useful village of South Cerney along the river Churn, was identified by Bazeley and Kennen, and accepted by other historians as the one built by Miles of Gloucester during the Anarchy and captured by King Stephen's forces in 1139, but the record of this is uncertain and Renn suggested that Ashton Keynes Castle was the more likely site for these events, and King mentions that this castle is frequently confused with a castle in Cerne Abbas, Dorset and a lost castle in Calne, Wiltshire.

The subsequent fate of the castle is unknown.
