= Ashton Keynes =

Village in Wiltshire, England

Coordinates: 51.645°N 01.935°W

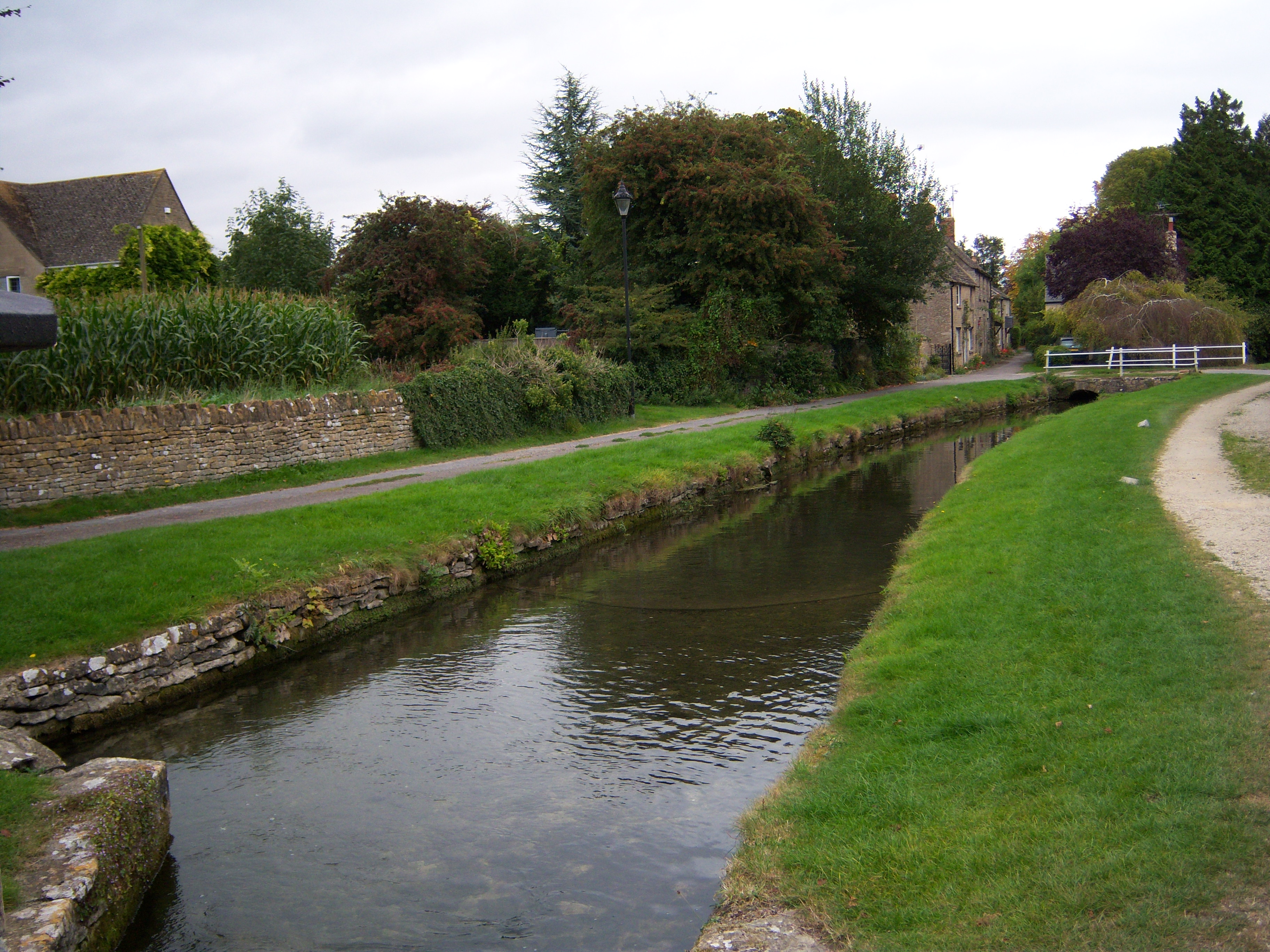
- The village channel of the Thames entering the village

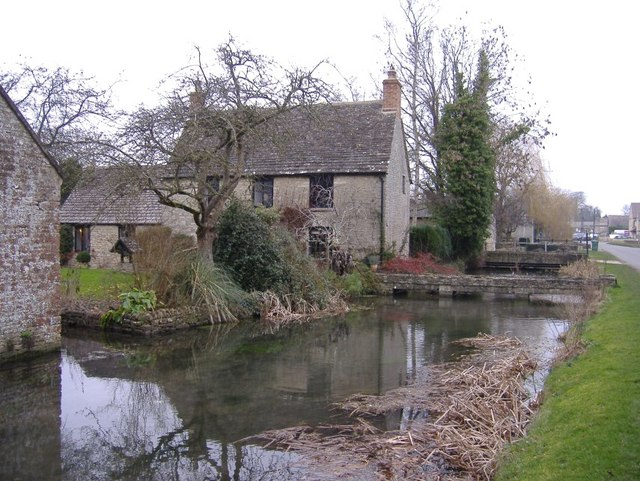
- Homes alongside the same channel, in turn alongside the main road through the village: High Road

- Location within Wiltshire
- Population: 1,426 (2021)
- OS grid reference: SU046940
- Unitary authority: Wiltshire
- Ceremonial county: Wiltshire
- Region: South West
- Country: England
- Sovereign state: United Kingdom
- Post town: SWINDON
- Postcode district: SN6
- Dialling code: 01285
- Police: Wiltshire
- Fire: Dorset and Wiltshire
- Ambulance: South Western
- UK Parliament: South Cotswolds
- Website: Parish Council

Ashton Keynes is a village and civil parish in north Wiltshire, England which borders with Gloucestershire. The village is about 5 miles (8 km) south of Cirencester and 3.5 miles (5.6 km) west of Cricklade. At the 2011 census the population of the parish, which includes the hamlet of North End, was 1,400.

The village lies within the Cotswold Water Park and on both sides of the River Thames, which has many channels here. It is about 6.5 miles (10 km) from the river's source at Thames Head.

== History ==
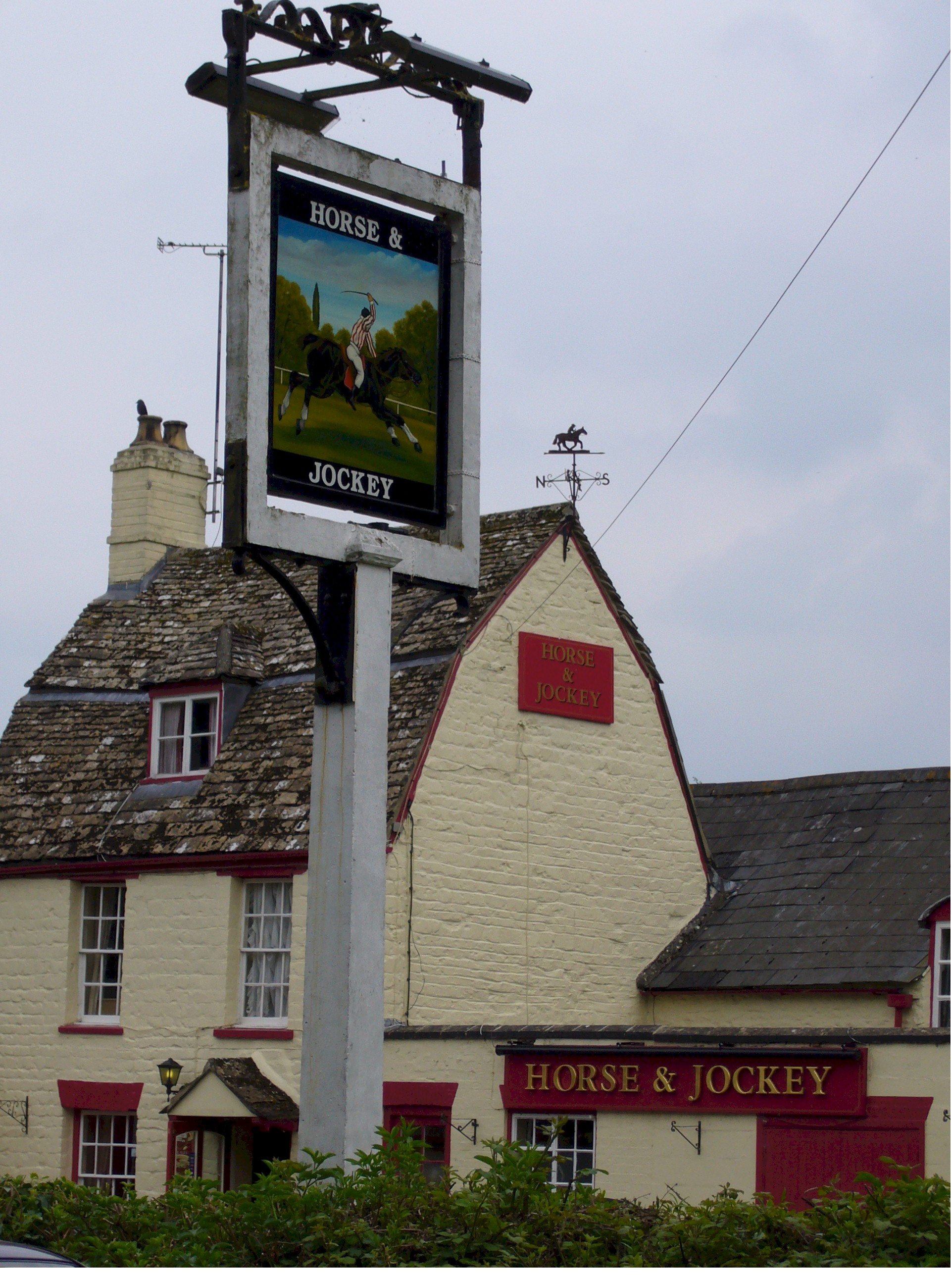
The Horse and Jockey pub (now closed) in 2007

A Romano-British settlement and field system was west of the present-day village, spanning the county boundary; it was investigated in 1971 before it was destroyed by gravel extraction. 'Ashton' comes from the Old English Æsctūn, meaning 'place or settlement where ash trees grew'. In 1086, land at Essitone held by Cranborne Priory (Dorset) was recorded in the Domesday Book within Cricklade hundred. The land was transferred to the recently founded Tewkesbury Abbey (Gloucestershire) in 1102.

Ashton Keynes Castle (or Hall's Close) was a 12th-century moated ringwork and bailey, just north of the village. The manor was held by the de Cahaignes or Keynes family, and this was incorporated into the village name. Land at Leigh, to the southeast, was part of Ashton Keynes manor until 1584 when Leigh became a separate manor.

Ashton House was built in the 18th century and is Grade II listed.

In 1851 in the 35 homes in Gosditch were living a tailor, saddler, tallow chandler, stonemason, many glove makers and a cobbler. The Horse and Jockey (now closed) was a "scrumpy house", selling cider made from the apples from the orchards in the village.

Leigh became a separate civil parish in 1884.

The Swindon to Stroud railway, opened in 1841 and today known as the Golden Valley line, passes close to the southwest of Ashton Keynes parish. The station at Minety was renamed Minety and Ashton Keynes in 1905; it closed in 1964 on the withdrawal of stopping services.

Another railway, the Swindon, Marlborough and Andover Railway opened their extension from Swindon to Cirencester in 1883, passing through South Cerney parish to the northeast of Ashton Keynes; there was a station at South Cerney called Cerney and Ashton Keynes. By 1892 the line, now the Midland and South Western Junction Railway, was completed as far as Cheltenham and thus connected the Midlands with the docks at Southampton. The line closed to passengers in 1961 and the track was taken up.

Since c. 1944, much of the parish's land became large gravel pits. After removal of the gravel layer the void leads to lakes, and by 2010 these resulting shallow lakes covered about half of the parish land. Since 1967 the lakes here and of nearby parishes in Wiltshire and Gloucestershire – over 40 square miles (100 km^{2}) – have been designated as the Cotswold Water Park, with areas for nature conservation, recreation and holiday accommodation.

To take gravel lorries away from the villages, and to provide access to the water park, from 1971 the Spine Road was built across the parish, its east end connecting with the A419 Cirencester-M4 road.

A southwest locality, mostly of the 20th century, remains known as Derry Fields.

=== The Bruderhof ===
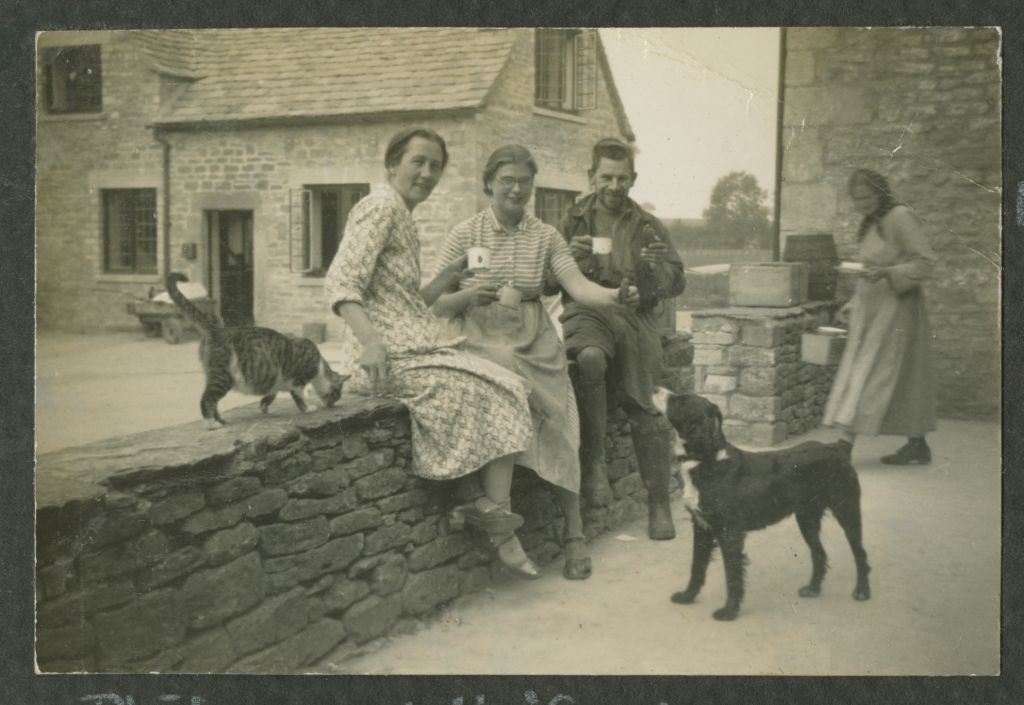
Bruderhof members at Ashton Fields

In 1936, a German pacifist group known as the Bruderhof bought 200 acres (80 ha) at Ashton Fields, near Ashton Keynes, to serve as a mission post. In 1937 this became the group's main home, when it was forced to leave Germany. The membership grew to over 350, with many young English conscientious objectors joining. However, even before the Second World War, the group was boycotted locally.

In 1940, the Bruderhof was given the choice of leaving England as a group or having its Germans interned and its Englishmen conscripted, and decided to leave. Most members left for Paraguay, but a few stayed in England, bought a 182-acre (74 ha) farm near Ludlow, and moved there in March 1942.

== Religious sites ==
=== Parish church ===
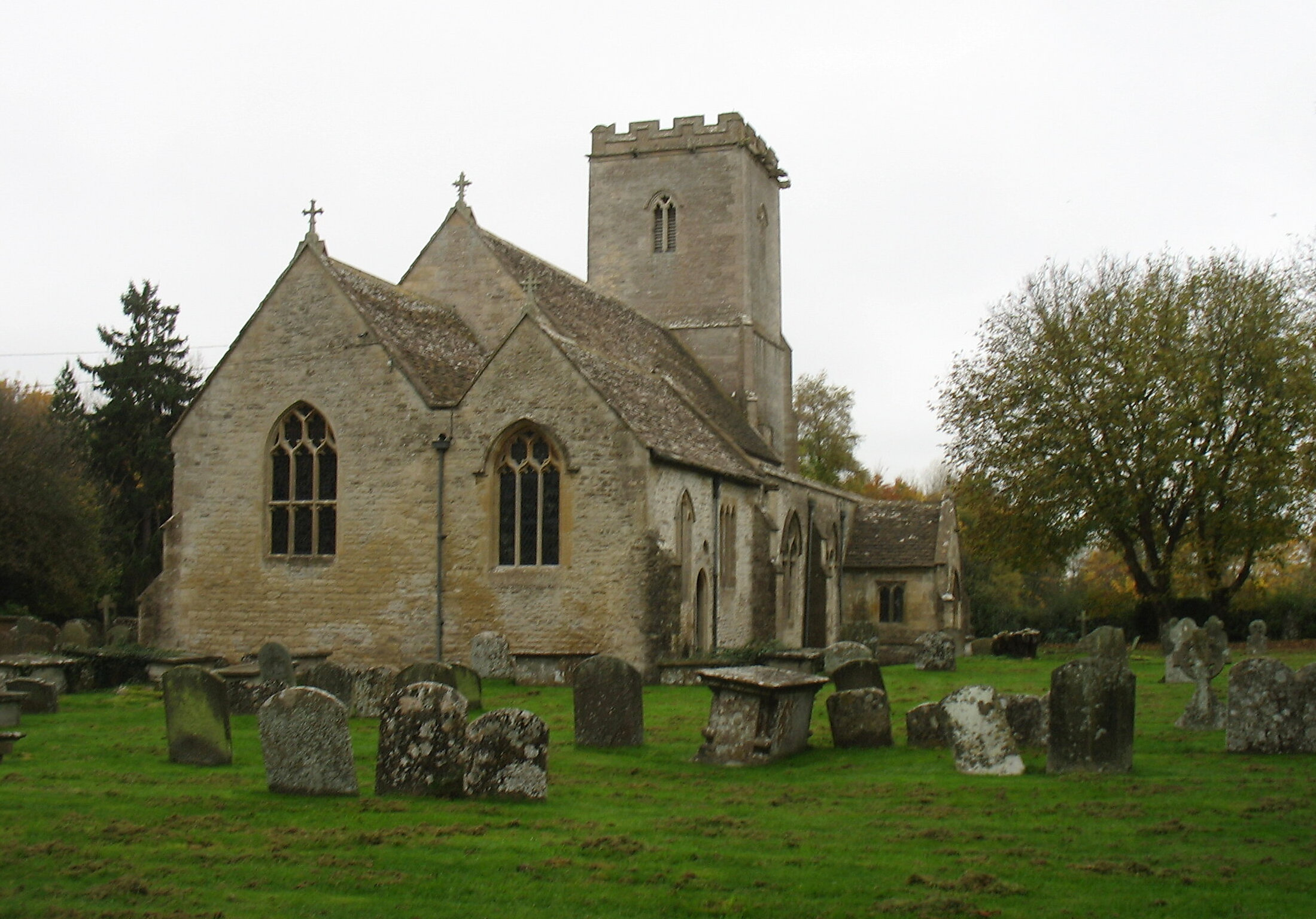
Church of the Holy Cross

The Church of England parish church of the Holy Cross has stood since the late 12th century at what is now on the northwest edge of the village. Of coursed limestone, it has a west tower, nave with narrow aisles, and chancel with north chapel. It was altered in later centuries, and restored to designs by William Butterfield in 1876–77 yet it retains early features: the north arcade was built in two phases from the late-12th century to the mid-13th after the south arcade – built around 1200. The chancel arch has three carved orders; Butterfield made this wider and taller but keeping stonework from the late 12th century.

The north chapel is from the early 13th century. In the next century the three-stage tower was built, the walls of the aisles were rebuilt and the clerestory (outer superstructure) was added; altogether giving the form close to that of today. The north and south porches were added in the 15th century, and the nave roof is from then. Some windows were renewed in the 19th century, and Butterfield's work embellished the east end of the chancel using polychrome brickwork and floor tiles. The building, little altered since then, was designated as Grade I listed in 1955 – the rarest and highest grading of three.

The 12th-century tubular font is decorated with carved leaves and chevrons.

The ring of bells was increased from five to six in 1994, and includes four cast by Abraham I Rudhall of Rudhall of Gloucester in 1707 and 1713.

All Saints Church at Leigh, built in the 13th century, was a chapelry of Ashton Keynes. Baptisms and marriages took place there but lacking right of burials alongside until 1865. Leigh in secular matters became a separate civil parish in 1884. As to ecclesiastical parish this and the benefice continued as 'Ashton Keynes with Leigh' however the two separated in their parochial church council some time after 1978. For a few years from 1982 the vicar also served Minety parish. Today the parish is part of the Upper Thames group uniting the Anglican clergy of Ashton Keynes, Leigh, Latton, and Cricklade around St Sampson's, Cricklade.

=== Others ===
A Congregational chapel (Bethesda Chapel) was built in 1838 and closed in 1970. A Primitive Methodist chapel was opened in 1840 and closed in the early 1930s.

=== Crosses ===
There are four medieval crosses within the village, all are Grade II listed memorials and some are also scheduled monuments. One is a preaching cross in the churchyard that now serves as the war memorial. A wayside cross sits beside the River Thames at Gumstool Bridge. A third is in the junction of Park Place and High Road, outside the White Hart Inn probably served as the market cross. The fourth is also a wayside cross and is harder to locate and on private land, off Park Place.

== Amenities ==
The local school is Ashton Keynes Church of England School, a voluntary controlled school. Parts of the school building date back to 1870.

Ashton Keynes is twinned with the French village of Grandchamps-des-Fontaines. The Twinning Association organises regular exchange trips and other activities between the communities.

Residents own two High Road community businesses which were saved from closure. The village's remaining pub, the White Hart Inn, is collectively owned and run by residents who took on the licence in 2011. In 2012, it was awarded 'Best Community Pub' for the South West region in the Great British Pub Awards. Since December 2011, the village shop is also community owned and run. It is housed in a purpose-built annexe to the village hall.

== Landmarks ==
=== River Thames ===
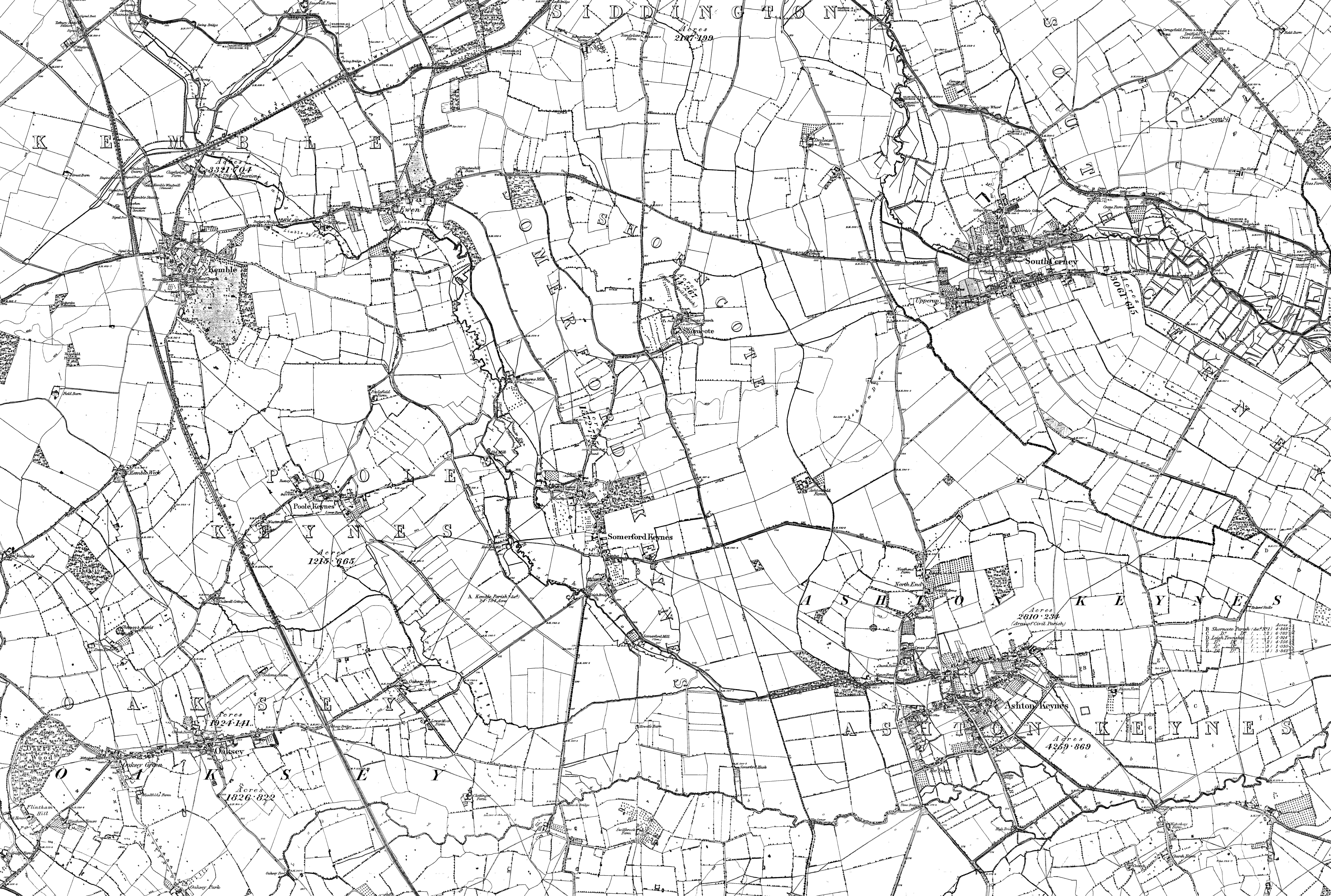
The Thames is mainly in two channels, forming a square, in the parish; shown with the buildings and land of the 1880s. In this map only the southwestern channel is marked alongside, prominently, liable to floods.

The river forms two channels – making a large square – in the parish, enclosing the western half of the village and in the past powering mills of a modest nature. The southwestern channel is joined by the Swill Brook and smaller tributaries join, particularly at the re-convergence of the channels. The Thames' northeastern channel, the village channel, is deeply entrenched at the places it has frontage to more than 30 of the village's homes and where it is crossed by many flat-deck bridges, some of brick or stone arch.

One public bridge, Gumstool Bridge, is not quite flat. Made of limestone it is "probably medieval"; it has two arches, vertical sides rising to form a parapet 80 cm high, triangular copings and a raised, squared apex. Two other bridges are consistent with a slightly pre-1800 date. The manor house and adjacent church farm enjoy the vestige of a moat, its southern limb; the rest was intact for many centuries, as seen in maps of the 19th century.

Parts of the parish see periodic flooding, and the village channel along beside High Road was prone to washing down to the school and beyond on its near banks. Such villagers expected parts of their grounds or even home to be flooded every winter, although the channel could be controlled to directed to the other, considerably, by opening and closing 'hatches' and ideally pre-emptively by raising of the main sluice after the point of divergence took place.

Some riparian residents talked of opening their doors for a flow of water, and 1 foot (0.30 m) of water indoors for weeks. As late as 1924 there were 23 children absent from school in June when flooding in the Derry (south of the Horse and Jockey public house) stranded them in their bedrooms after a night of storms. An aggravating factor was soiling of the flow of the village channel with rubbish and/or privy waste especially after the demise of the night soil industry, causing a frequent and serious public health problem from rats and water contamination, particularly in Gosditch between the two branches of the river.

=== SSSIs ===
Two Sites of Special Scientific Interests are in the parish. Pike Corner is a naturally-drained, wet ("unimproved") flood meadow by the Swill Brook. Upper Waterhay Meadow, frequently flooded by a Thames channel itself, hosts such species as snakeshead fritillaries – managed by Wiltshire Wildlife Trust as a nature reserve.

=== Cotswold Community ===
The Cotswold Community, 250 acres (100 ha) in the western fields was the home of the Bruderhof (see above). The site includes a "Barn, now community hall with chapel under", built 1779, which is Grade II listed. It later hosted the Cotswold School, a therapeutic community for children from complex backgrounds, operated by the National Children's Home charity which became Action for Children. It closed in 2012 and the charity vacated in 2013, leading to a proposal for housing.

== Notable residents ==
Reginald Dyer, the officer responsible for the Amritsar massacre in 1919, retired to Ashton Keynes and was living in the village at Ashton Fields at the time of his death in 1927.
