= Ashton Keynes Castle =

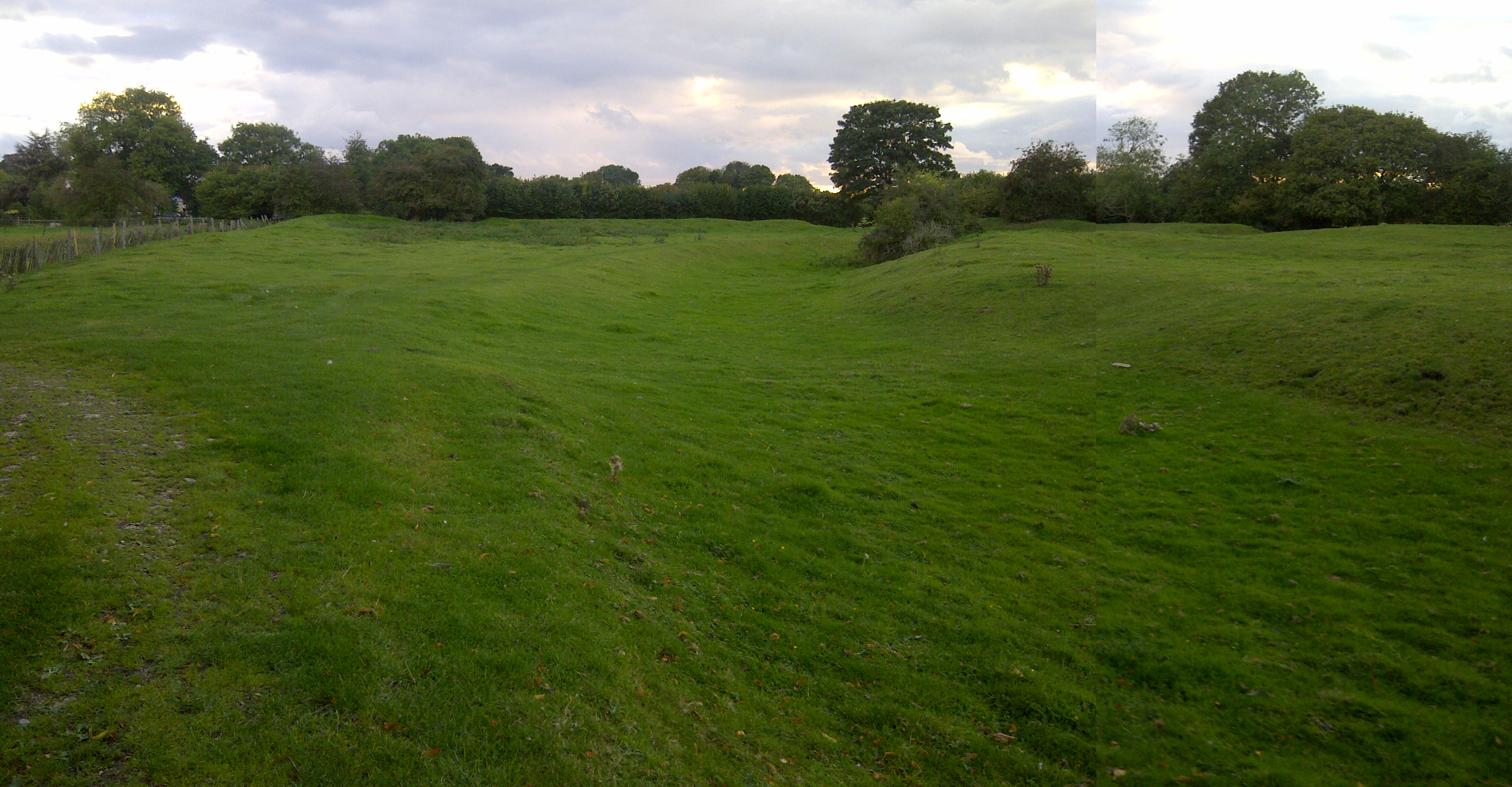
- The remaining earthworks where Ashton Keynes Castle once stood

- Location of the site in Wiltshire
- 51.649026°N 1.930969°W
- Type: Scheduled Monument
- Location: Ashton Keynes, Near Cricklade, Wiltshire, England

Ashton Keynes Castle was a castle in the village of Ashton Keynes, near to the town of Cricklade in Wiltshire, England (grid reference SU049945). It is also known as Hall's Close, while locals call it The Battlefield. The scheduled monument consists of a ringwork and bailey 100 metres (330 ft) west of Kentend Farm.

== History ==
The castle was founded in the 12th century by the Keynes family. Excavations at the site show that the castle consisted of a ringwork adjoined by a "single sub-rectangular bailey". In their present condition the earthworks appear dilapidated, but a trial trench excavated in 1959 found a strong outer wall above the ringwork, surrounded by a spring-fed ditch which itself was revetted with timber and lined with clay.

The overall appearance of the remains suggests that the ruins are of a fortification that lies between a ringwork and a motte-and-bailey castle, which according to Renn, is proof that this castle rather than South Cerney Castle is the one that was captured by King Stephen from Miles of Gloucester during the Anarchy.

Excavations carried out by G.M. Knocker and others have unearthed floor tiles, glazed and unglazed pottery, and other items dating from the early 12th to the 13th century. These discoveries, with the condition and the form of fortifications, are consistent with the theory that the military purpose of the castle was short-lived, and it was converted into a manor by the de Keynes soon afterwards.

== Bibliography ==
- Fry, Plantagenet Somerset (1980). The David & Charles Book of Castles. Newton Abbot: David & Charles. p. 180. ISBN 0-7153-7976-3.
