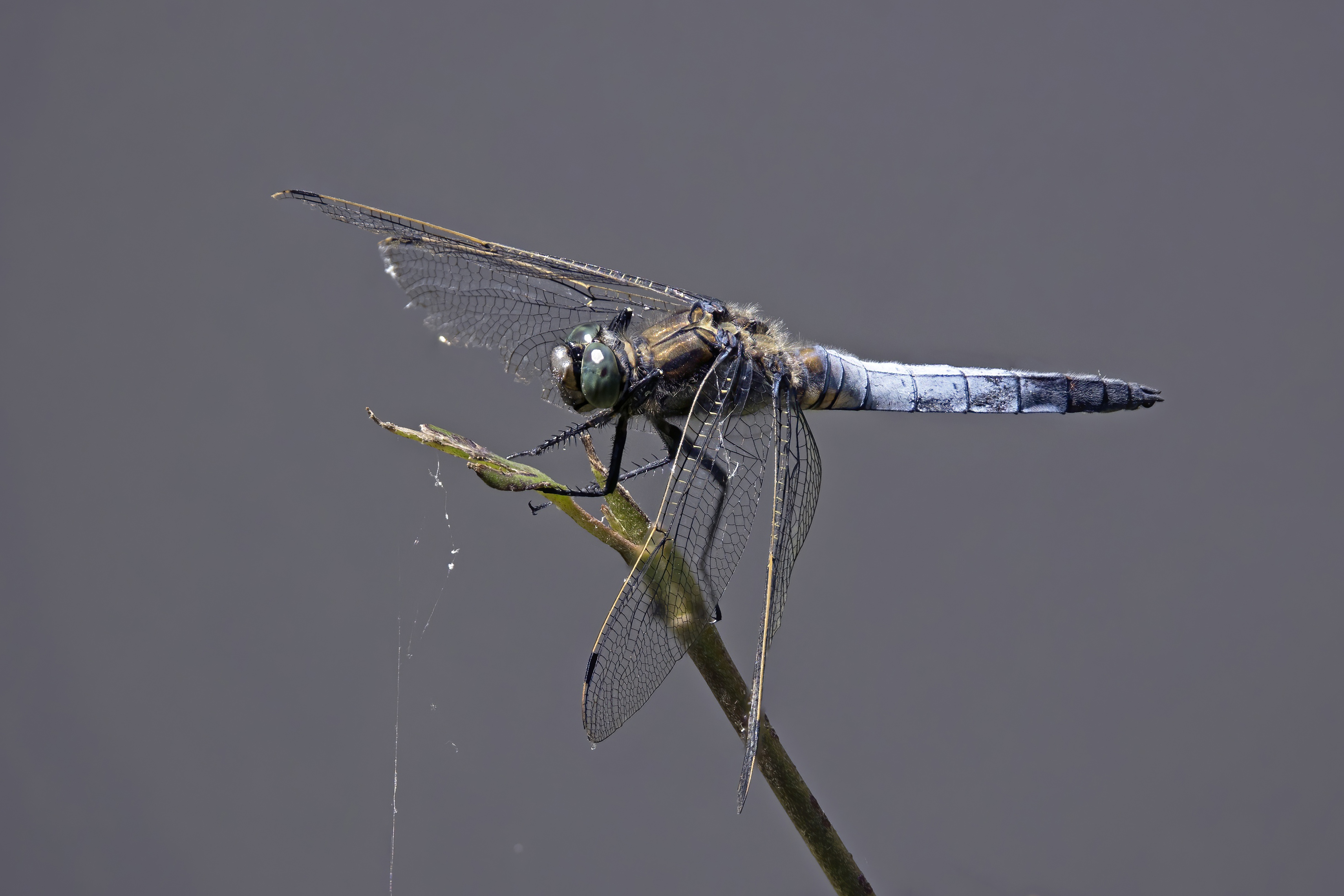
- Male
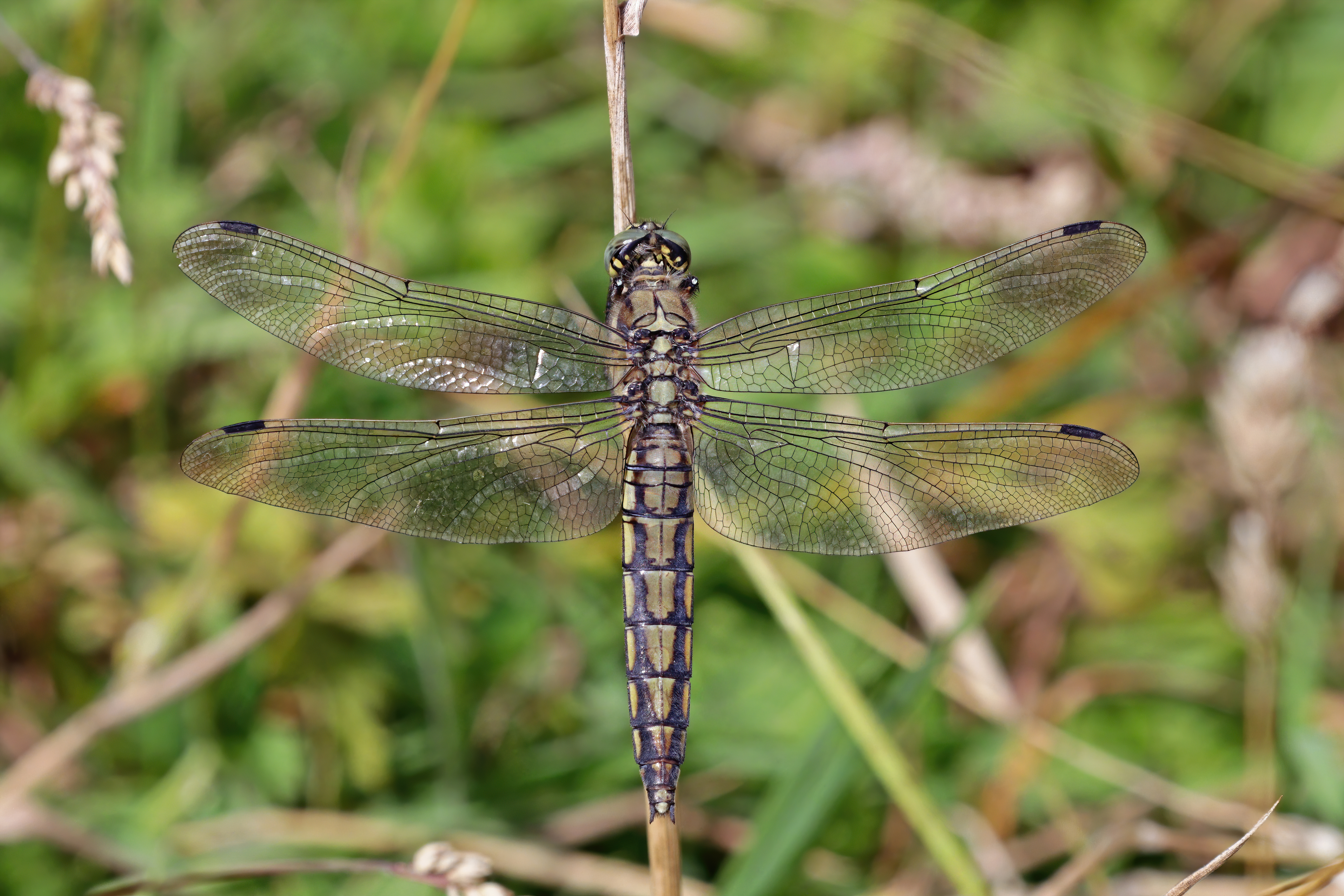
- Female

Conservation status
- Least Concern (IUCN 3.1)

Scientific classification
- Kingdom: Animalia
- Phylum: Arthropoda
- Clade: Pancrustacea
- Class: Insecta
- Order: Odonata
- Suborder: Anisoptera
- Superfamily: Libelluloidea
- Family: Libellulidae
- Genus: Orthetrum
- Species: O. cancellatum

Binomial name
- Orthetrum cancellatum (Linnaeus, 1758)

= Black-tailed skimmer =

Species of dragonfly

The black-tailed skimmer (Orthetrum cancellatum) is a dragonfly belonging to the family Libellulidae.

== Distribution ==
This species is widespread in Europe and Asia. It is found throughout the European continent including the Mediterranean islands but is absent in the far north of Britain and the northern half of Fennoscandia. This is one of the most common European species and it is still increasing its range northwards. To the east, the range extends over central Asia to Kashmir, Mongolia to the northern parts of China and Arunachal Pradesh in India.

It is present in Albania, Algeria, Armenia, Austria, Azerbaijan, Belarus, Belgium, Bosnia and Herzegovina, Bulgaria, China, Croatia, Cyprus, Czech Republic, Denmark, Estonia, Finland, France (Corsica, and mainland), Georgia, Germany, Greece, Hungary, India, Iran, Ireland, Italy, Kazakhstan, Kyrgyzstan, Latvia, Lebanon, Lithuania, Luxembourg, Malta, Moldova, Mongolia, Montenegro, Morocco, Netherlands, North Macedonia, Norway, Poland, Portugal, Romania, Russia, Serbia, Slovakia, Slovenia, Spain, Sweden, Switzerland, Syria, Tajikistan, Tunisia, Turkey (including Turkey-in-Europe), Turkmenistan, Ukraine, United Kingdom, and Uzbekistan.

The black-tailed skimmer is abundant throughout its range and is one of the most commonly seen dragonflies in Europe. It holds a stable population and has no known major threats.

This species has expanded its range northwards, assisted by global warming and the creation of gravel pits which give it the extensive open unvegetated areas it prefers. In Great Britain it was confined to the southern half of England in 1900, with the first Essex record in 1934, and the first definite records in Ireland in 1937, but by 1995 its English distribution had only expanded slightly. Since 1996 it has spread rapidly north, reaching Northumberland in 2009, and now occurs north to Edinburgh in southern Scotland. Conversely to its northward spread, it is decreasing rapidly in Malta at the southern edge of its range.

== Habitat ==
This dragonfly is found at any open water with bare patches along the shore where the patrolling males frequently rest in the sun. It also inhabits near slow-flowing waters. It favours lakes, slow rivers, ponds and sometimes marshy area, without dense riparian vegetation. Females are less bold and not encountered as regularly. Adults prefer to perch on bare ground and rocks to bask in sunlight to warm up.

== Description ==
It is a fairly large dragonfly (the length of 47–53 mm, 29–35 mm abdomen, rear wing 35–41 mm) with relatively broad, flattened abdomen, but not as broad as the chaser species. With age, adult males develop extensive blue pruinescence on their abdomen, offset by yellow lateral patches. The middle lobe of the pronotum is large and notched in the middle. The chest is yellow or yellowish-brown. The base of the hind wings do not show a dark opaque spots. The pterostigma is dark brown or black. On the front wings pterostigma 2–3 mm long. The anal appendages are black. The females and immature males are a deep yellow colour, with wavy black lines dorsally on their abdomen. Males and females have the costal vein (the leading edge of the wing) yellow or black.

The species is similar to its much more localised congener the Orthetrum albistylum, but readily identifiable in the field. The males develop a blue pruinescence on the abdomen darkening to the rear with S8-10 becoming black. Its eyes are very dark green. They fly swift and low, skimming the water surface. Females retain their colour and markings though they become quite greyish brown with age. This species could be confused with Keeled skimmer or Scarce chaser.

== Adults ==
♂: Adult males have a bluish or blue-grey patina on the body, gradually darkening with age. They have a blue abdomen with a black tip, and transparent wings. The young have a grid pattern on a yellow-brownish abdomen.

♀: Adult females have a yellow-brownish abdomen with a lattice pattern (wide longitudinal dark brown stripes and bright crescent-shaped spots), and transparent wings. The tenth tergite of the abdomen is black. The abdomen of immature males is similar.

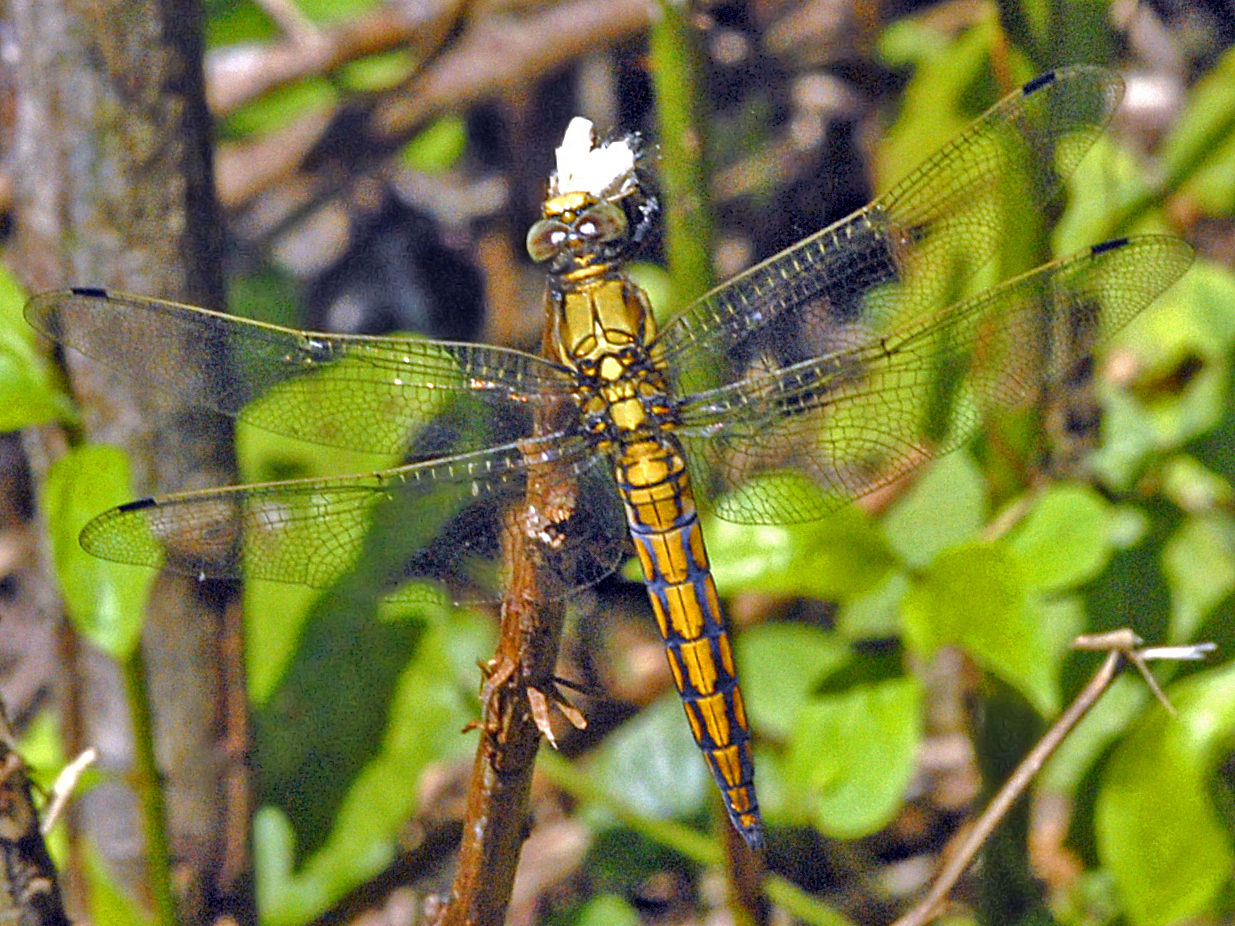
Immature male

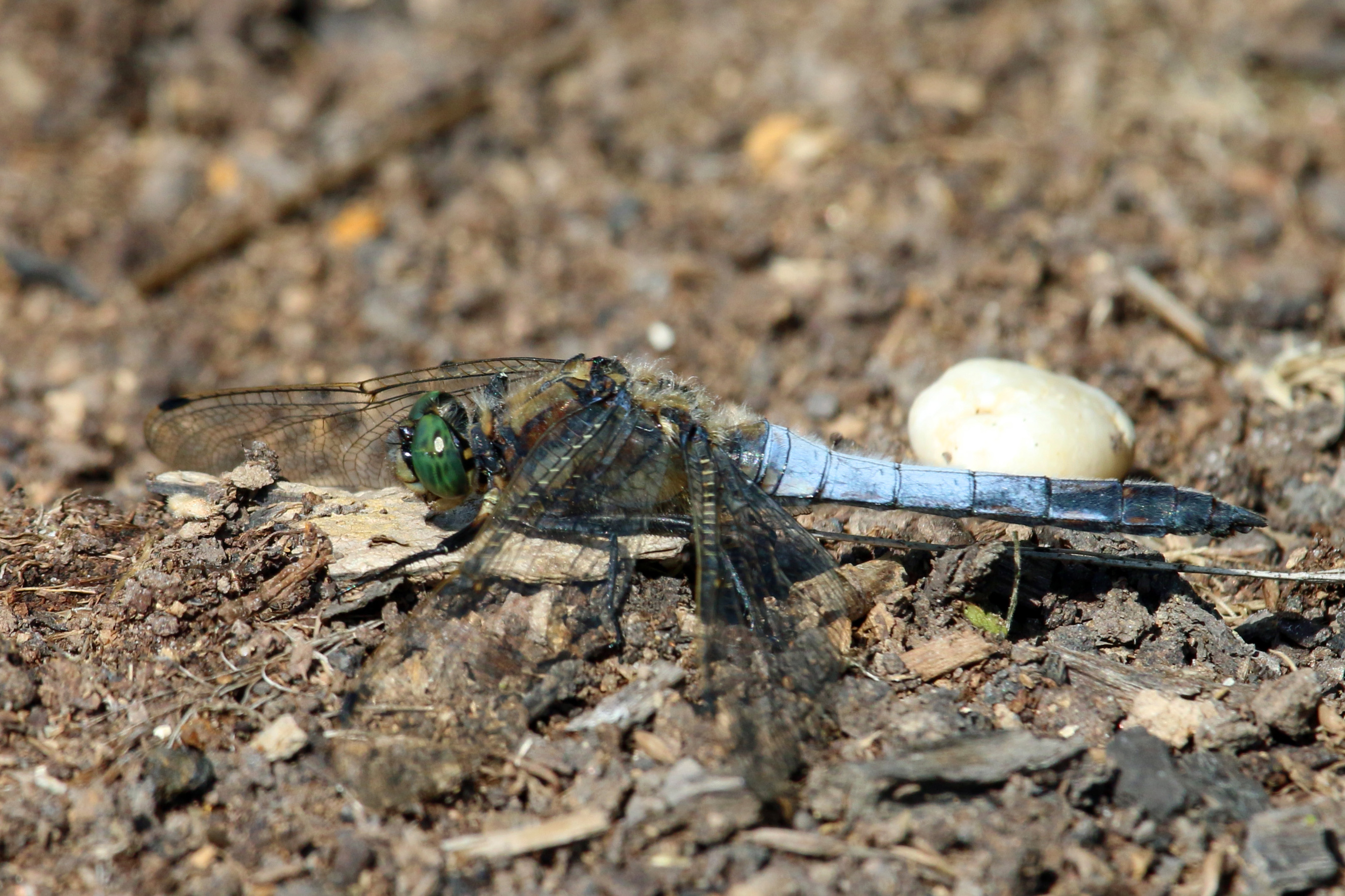
Mature male

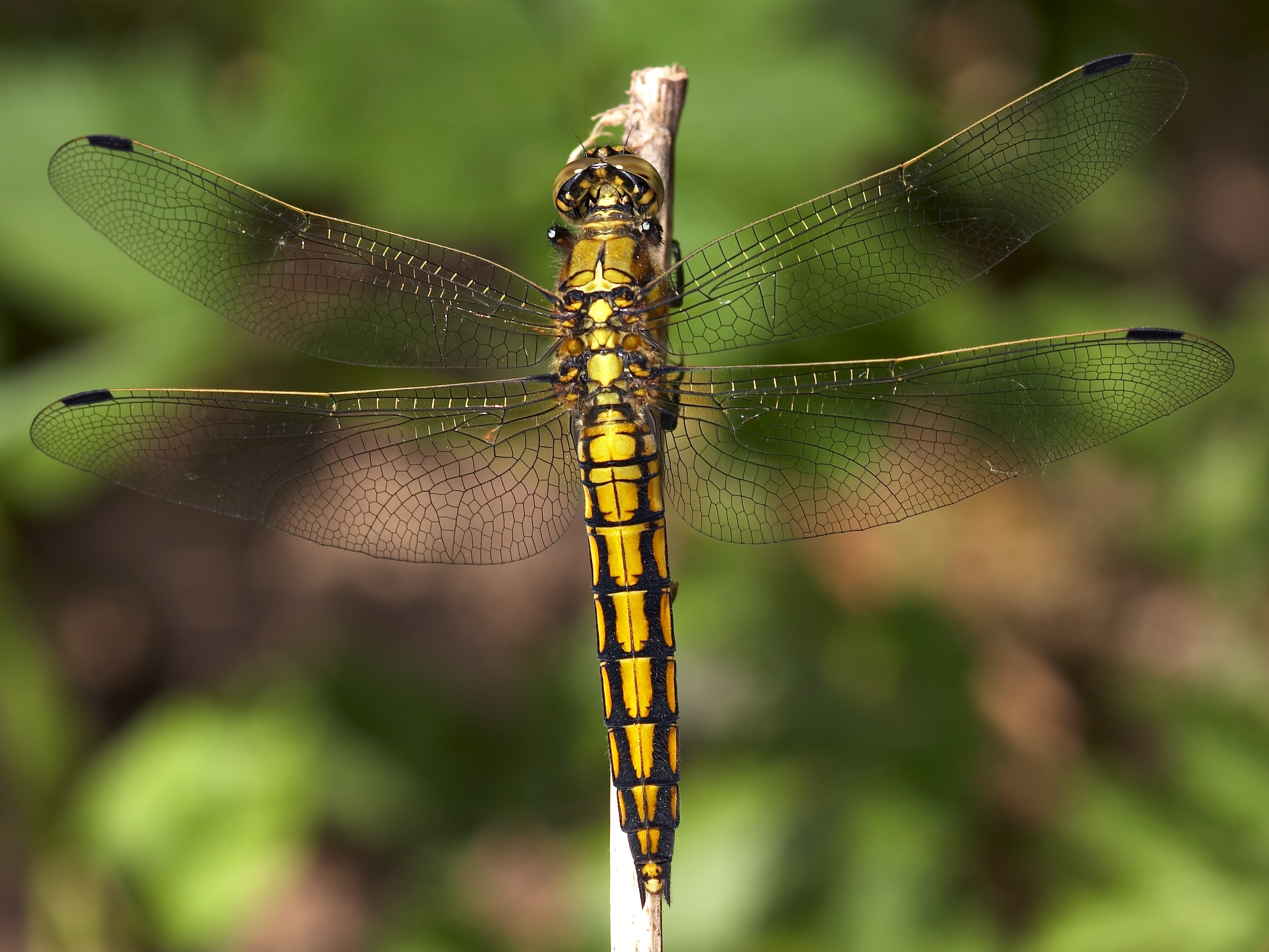
Immature female

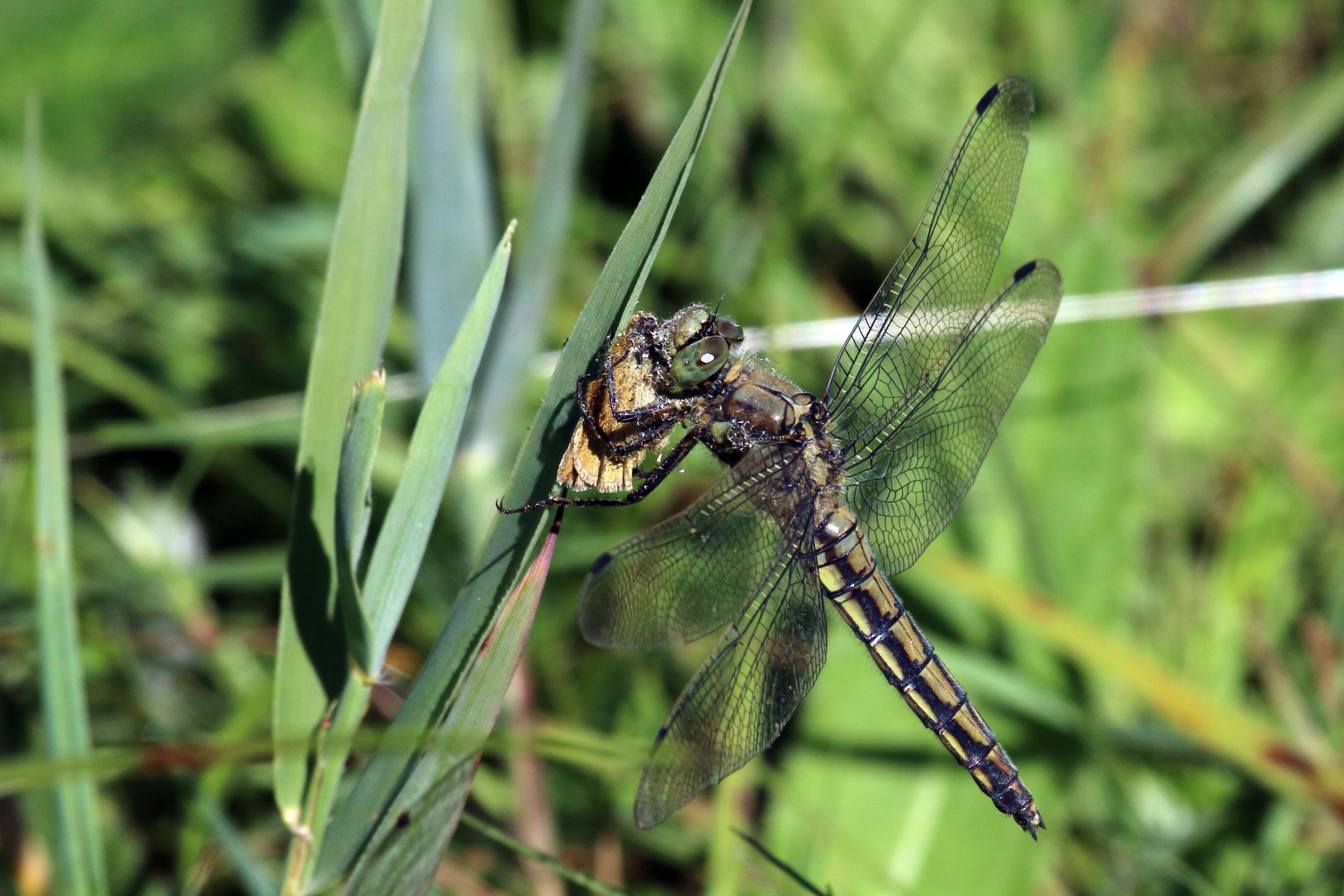
Mature female

Female, showing face

Adults can reach a length of about 47–53 mm. Average wingspan is about 77 mm, while hindwings are 35–40 mm long. The eyes are dorsally narrowly apposed to dorsally broadly contiguous. They are brown (in the female), or blue (in the male). Legs are black and brown (the femoral bases brown). Thoracic antehumeral stripes are absent. The wings spread more or less horizontally in repose. They are dissimilar in shape and venation, sessile, unpatterned and clear. The inner wing venation is blackish. Discoidal cell is divided longitudinally into a conspicuous triangle and supra-triangle. There are antenodal veins in the forewings 10–13 (fewer in the hindwings). Pterostigma is well over twice but no more than five times as long as wide. Abdomen is lanceolate and 30–35 mm long; predominantly blue (in the male), or brown (in the female), or grey (sometimes, in old females). It is rather plain (in the male, but often with orange lateral markings, and darkened over the terminal segments), or predominantly longitudinally lined (the female with a dark medio-lateral band on either side along each segment); without mid-dorsal spots. The male abdomen is without auricles on segment 2; with a single inferior anal appendage.

== Nymphs ==
The nymphs are stout, body is expanded in the middle. When mature, they are 23–25.5 mm long. The postocular lobes is curving sharply to the back of the head from some distance behind the eyes. The antennae is 7 segmented. The mask have the prementum hollowed dorsally. The prementum bears three (rarely two or four) long setae inserted near each lateral margin, and two medial fields of seven to eight short spiniform setae, the latter flanked by four setae of medium length. The body of the labial palps bears 6 or 7 major setae. Distal margins of the labial palps are weakly crenate. Legs are longer than the abdomen. The abdomen terminates in five short spine-like appendages. The cerci are no more than half the length of the paraprocts. The abdomen has mid-dorsal spines. The mid-dorsal abdominal spines are prominent on segments 3 to 6. The abdomen is without a mid-dorsal spine on segment 8; gizzard with 4–8 folds.

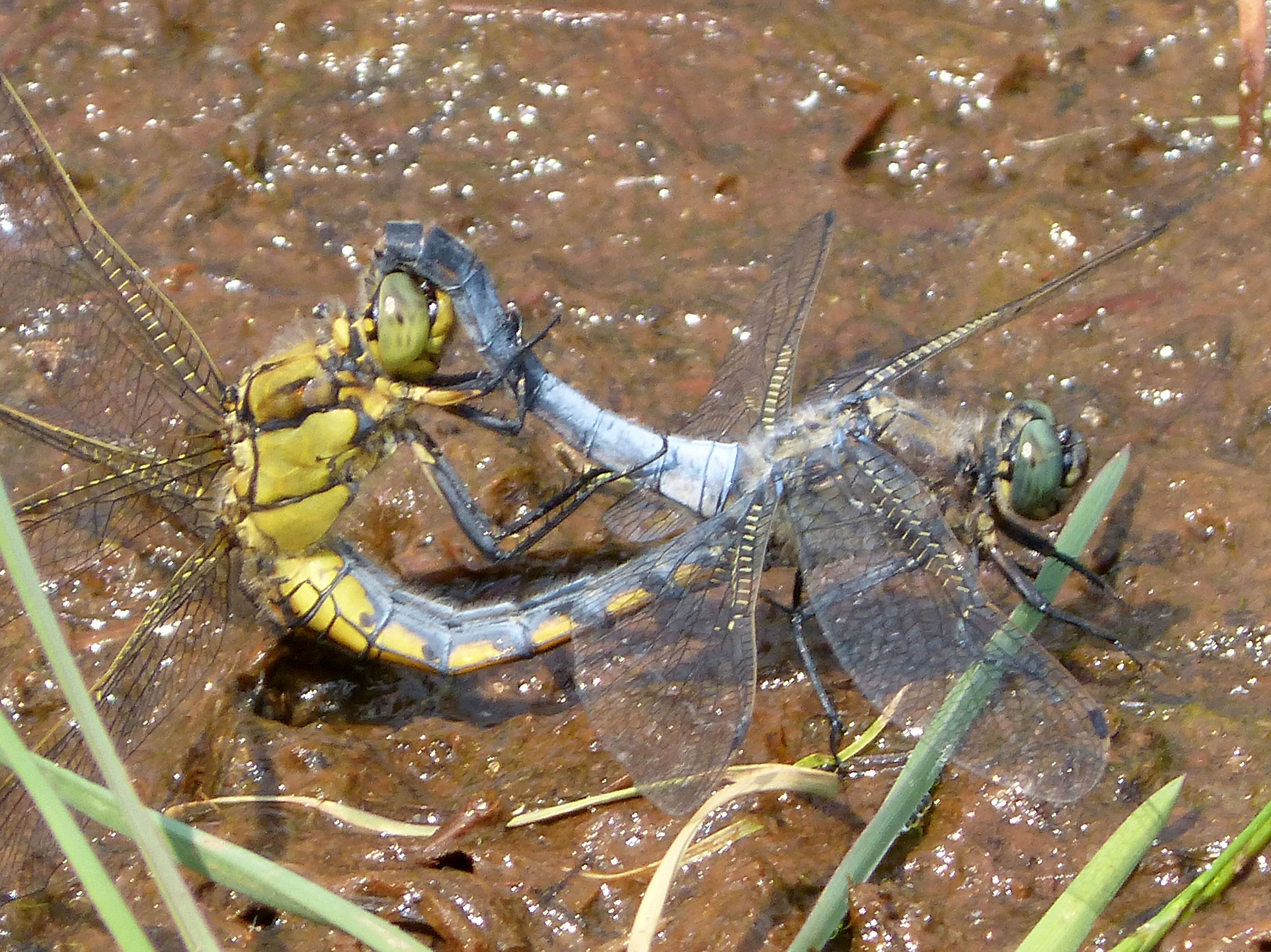
Mating wheel

== Biology and behaviour ==
The main flight period is June and July. Males characteristically perch horizontally on exposed surfaces. They fly swift and low, skimming the water surface, while defending their territories. Mating can occur in flight or on land.

Females oviposit alone but with male in attendance. Eggs are laid in flight by dipping abdomen onto water surface. They hatch after five or six weeks and the larvae live partially hidden by bottom debris. They emerge after two or three years. Larvae prefer bottom areas rich in vegetation and decaying plant material.

== Sources ==
- "Orthetrum cancellatum". British Dragonfly Society.
- Klaas-Douwe B Dijkstra, Richard Lewington, 2006: Field Guide to the Dragonflies of Britain and Europe. British Wildlife Publishing, Gillingham.
- A. Sciberras, 2008: A Contribution To The Knowledge Of Odonata In The Maltese Islands. The Central Mediterranean Naturalist 4(4): 275–288.
