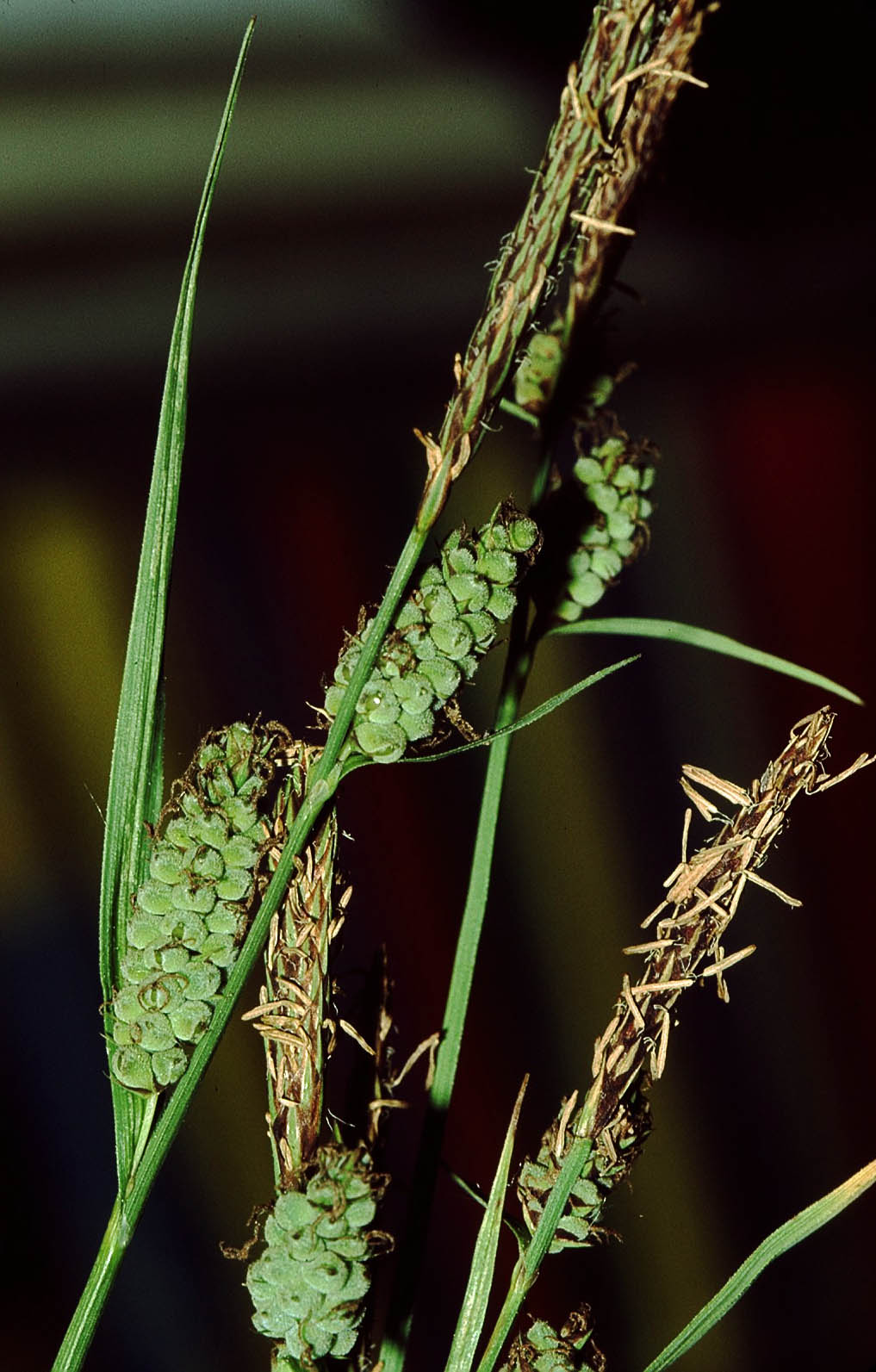

Scientific classification
- Kingdom: Plantae
- Clade: Tracheophytes
- Clade: Angiosperms
- Clade: Monocots
- Clade: Commelinids
- Order: Poales
- Family: Cyperaceae
- Genus: Carex
- Species: C. tomentosa

Binomial name
- Carex tomentosa L.

= Carex tomentosa =

Downey-fruited sedge

Species of grass-like plant

Carex tomentosa, the downey-fruited sedge, is dispersed throughout Central Europe in scattered groups and is a rarely found member of the family Cyperaceae.

== Description ==
Carex tomentosa is a perennial Herbaceous plant that reaches heights from about 20 to 40 cm and has long stolons. The stiff, upright triangular stem is rough and hairy and the top and has a blackish red sheath at its base. The stem leaves are grey-green, at most 2 mm wide and equipped with triangular tips.

The lowest bract has foliage-like development and dominates the spikelets. At last it often projects itself horizontally. Most of these plants own up to two 0.5 to 1.5 long female spikelets and a terminal male spikelet. These are short stalked and are somewhat removed from the rest of the plant. The fruiting spikelets have white and brown spots. The husks are pointed, red to light-brown colored and have a green middle nerve. The fruit tubes are 1.5 to 2 mm long, with a grey-brown color, spherically ovulate, and have a hairy, felt-like surface.

They predominantly bloom in May and June.

The chromosome count is 2n = 48.

== Occurrence ==
Carex tomentosa comes from southern Scandinavia and England to northern Italy, the Balkans and western Siberia. It is a temperate-continental flora. In Austria the species has a scattered occurrence, while it is generally spread in Switzerland. Carex tomentosa appears in Germany only in the middle and southern areas. It is absent from northern Germany, as it is also in the uplands and in the Alps in large areas.

It populates alternately wet meadows, garden edges and light, somewhat moist deciduous forests. It rises up in the Alps at elevations which are barely above 1500 m. The downey-fruited sedge needs dry summers, but moist winters and springs, loamy or clayey, lime or calcareous nitrogen-poor soil in not too shaded areas.

Carex tomentosa withstands fertilization poorly and it has disappeared from many grasslands. In moist, wet meadows it came to a population of 1900 in central Europe.

== Species protection ==
Risk in Germany: Category 3: endangered
