= Elmlea Meadows =

Protected area in Gloucestershire, England

- Site of Special Scientific Interest
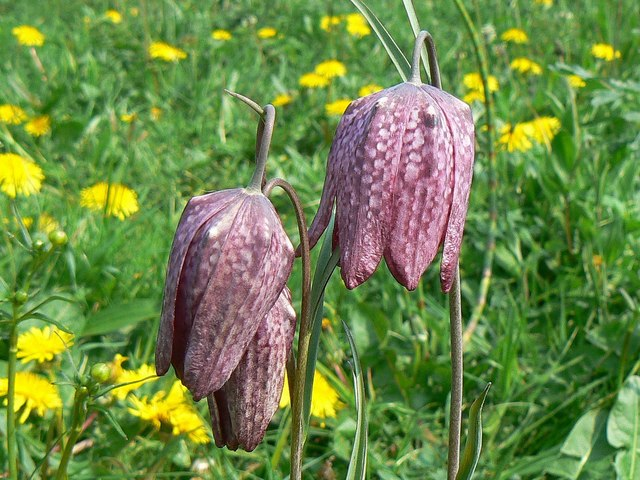
- Example - snake's head fritillary (Fritillaria meleagris)

- Location within Gloucestershire
- Location of Elmlea Meadows.
- Area of search: Gloucestershire
- Grid reference: SU079948
- Coordinates: 51.652387°N 1.886485°W
- Interest: Biological
- Area: 6.9 ha (17 acres)
- Notification date: 1989

Elmlea Meadows (grid reference SU079948) is a 6.9-hectare (17-acre) biological Site of Special Scientific Interest in Gloucestershire, England, notified in 1989. The site is listed in the 'Cotswold District' Local Plan 2001-2011 (on line) as a Key Wildlife Site (KWS).

== Location ==
The site lies to the north-west of Cricklade near the county boundary, and consists of three meadows which have been managed for hay followed by grazing. The meadows overlie the alluvium and gravels of the Thames floodplain.

== Species ==
The grassland included meadow foxtail and great burnet and supports a rich flora. This is a nationally important meadow area, and supports the nationally rare fritillary (Fritillaria meleagris) and the rare downy-fruited sedge (Carex tomentose). The population of fritillary is the largest reported in Gloucestershire. To the north of Cricklade, in the county of Wiltshire, is North Meadow which is both an SSSI and a national nature reserve (NNR) which supports some 80% of the British population of fritillary.

The small area of scrub on the site is dominated by grey willow and crack willow and supports a large number of typical wetland species. It is the only known site for tufted-sedge (Carex elata) in Gloucestershire.

== SSSI Source ==
- Natural England SSSI information on the citation
- Natural England SSSI information on the Elmlea Meadows units
