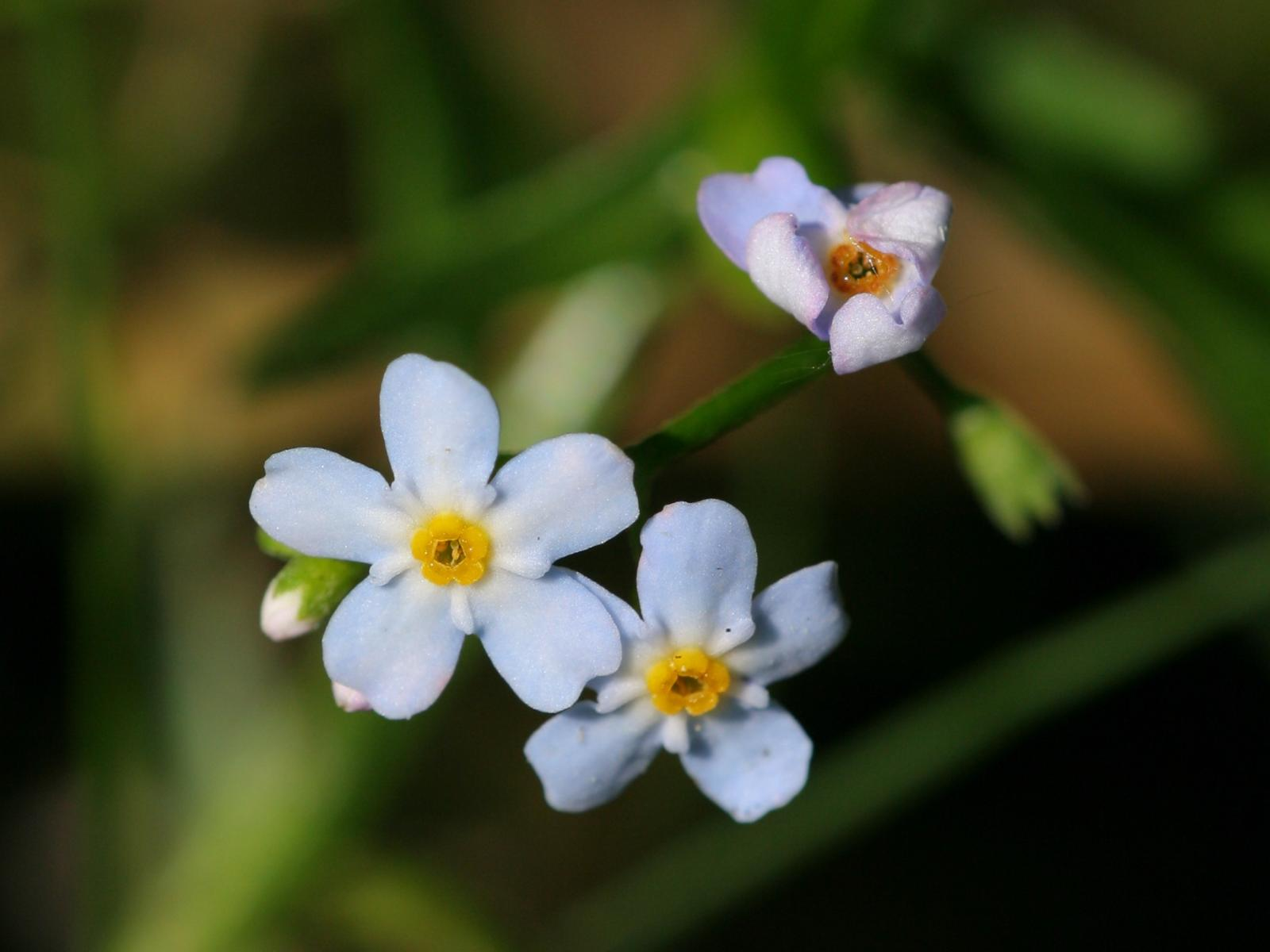

Conservation status
- Least Concern (IUCN 3.1)

Scientific classification
- Kingdom: Plantae
- Clade: Tracheophytes
- Clade: Angiosperms
- Clade: Eudicots
- Clade: Asterids
- Order: Boraginales
- Family: Boraginaceae
- Genus: Myosotis
- Species: M. laxa

Binomial name
- Myosotis laxa Lehm.

Synonyms
- Myosotis cespitosa var. laxa (Lehm.) DC.; Myosotis palustris var. laxa (Lehm.) A.Gray; Myosotis scorpioides subsp. baltica (Lehm.) Hegi; Myosotis scorpioides subsp. laxa (Lehm.) Hegi

= Myosotis laxa =

Species of flowering plant

Myosotis laxa is a species of flowering herb in the family Boraginaceae. This species of forget-me-not is known by several common names, including tufted forget-me-not, bay forget-me-not, small-flower forget-me-not, small-flowered forget-me-not, and smaller forget-me-knot. It has a circumboreal distribution, occurring throughout some parts of the Northern Hemisphere. It grows in many types of habitats, including moist and wet areas, and is sometimes aquatic, growing in shallow water.

The American naturalist and poet Henry David Thoreau described Myosotis laxa as:

The mouse-ear forget-me-not, Myosotis laxa, has now extended its racemes (?) very much, and hangs over the edge of the brook. It is one of the most interesting minute flowers. It is the more beautiful for being small and unpretending; even flowers must be modest.

== Description ==
The life cycle of Myosotis laxa can vary between an annual, biennial, and brief-lived perennial. It typically flowers May through September.

Myosotis laxa closely resembles Myosotis scorpioides L. but has two main identifying features. First, its corolla is smaller than M. scorpioides at 2 to 5 mm. wide and 5 to 10 mm. wide, respectively. Additionally, the style in M. laxa consistently surpasses the nutlet, while in M. scorpioides it does not. Generally, the leaves of M. laxa are smaller than M. scorpiodes, but this trait may vary between individuals.

The calyx of both M. laxa and M. scorpioides are characteristically covered in strigose hairs, while other Myosotis species are not. M. laxa is typically 10 to 40 cm. tall and decumbent, or prostrate, at its base. The inflorescence is terminal and the calyx is 3 to 5 mm. wide. Sometimes the calyx lobes are unequal in length and can be shorter or longer than the tube. The corolla is the light blue color, characteristic of the forget-me-nots, but can rarely be white or even yellow.

M. laxa is also known to have a coastal form that has been reported in the Baltic Sea Region, Caspian Sea, north central Asia, Altai, and Mongolia. However, studies have found that this form does not arise in relation to coastal distance, suggesting it could appear in any suitable habitat.

== Subspecies ==
Two subspecies of Myosotis laxa have been described: M. laxa subsp. baltica (Sam.) Hyl. ex Nordh. and M. laxa subsp. cespitosa (Schultz) Hyl. ex Nordh. These subspecies are known to be morphologically variable, and individuals are often found displaying traits of both.

Myosotis laxa subsp. baltica was once considered a separate species, named Myosotis baltica, but has since been genetically recognized as a subspecies of M. laxa and more likely a coastal ecotype. M. laxa subsp. baltica is endemic to the Baltic Sea Region and is most common in the Åland Islands and Finland. It portrays characteristics of living in a variable coastal habitat with larger seeds, earlier flowering times, rare lower branching, greater stem diameter, an annual life cycle, and longer pedicels while fruiting when compared to M. laxa subsp. cespitosa.

M. laxa subsp. cespitosa has a broader range than subsp. baltica and can be found throughout temperate Eurasia to northern Africa. While its conservation status is unknown or of least concern in most countries, it is on the IUCN Red List in Czechia. When compared to M. laxa subsp. baltica it is described as having a stronger stem and can vary between an annual, biennial, or perennial life cycle. Additionally, the subspecies often does not have leaves in the inflorescence and is more strongly branched in the upper portion of the plant than subsp. baltica.
