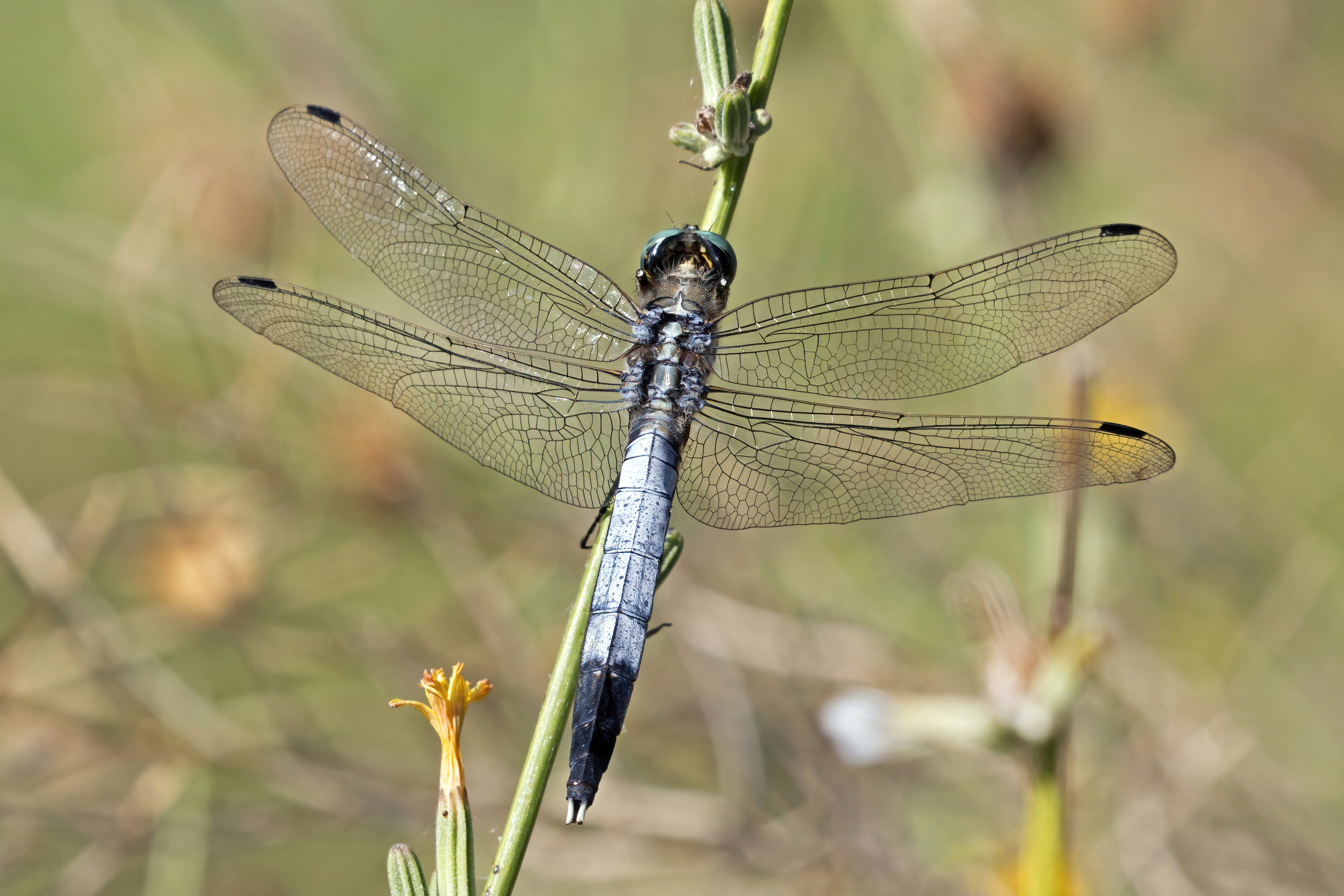
- male O. a. albistylum, Greece
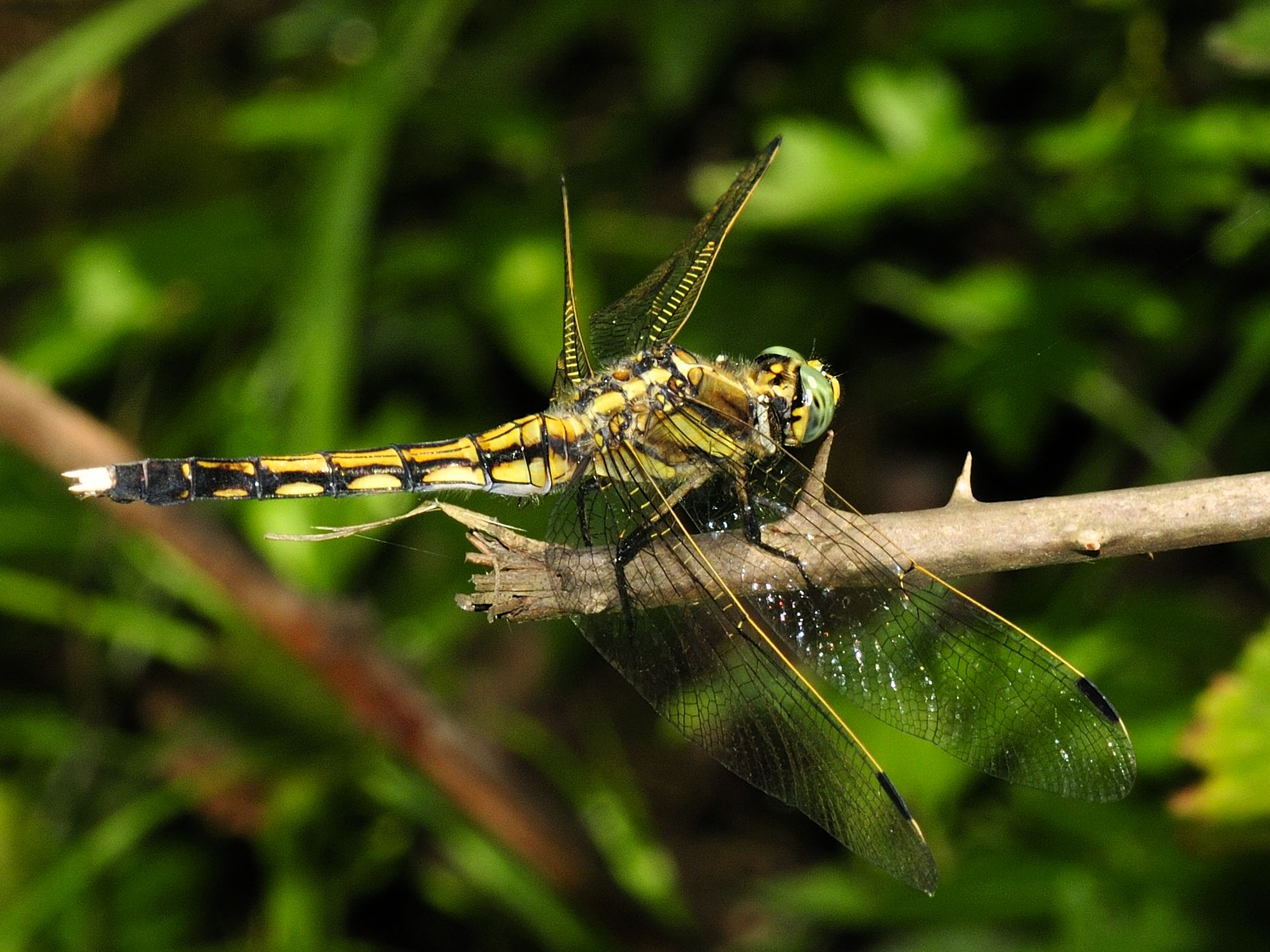
- female, Georgia

Conservation status
- Least Concern (IUCN 3.1)

Scientific classification
- Kingdom: Animalia
- Phylum: Arthropoda
- Clade: Pancrustacea
- Class: Insecta
- Order: Odonata
- Infraorder: Anisoptera
- Superfamily: Libelluloidea
- Family: Libellulidae
- Genus: Orthetrum
- Species: O. albistylum

Binomial name
- Orthetrum albistylum (Selys, 1848)

= Orthetrum albistylum =

Species of dragonfly

Orthetrum albistylum is a dragonfly species, which occurs from central and south Europe to China and Japan. Its distribution is often patchy but in many areas it is common. The species has recently spread its range northwards to the Baltic Sea coast in Poland. The common name for this species is white-tailed skimmer.

Orthetrum albistylum speciosum in Japan

One of the ongoing threats affecting the habitat of Orthetrum albistylum is the production of crops. The water pollution associated with crop production is also having a direct effect on the quality of the habitat of this species.

== See also ==
- Orthetrum

== Gallery ==
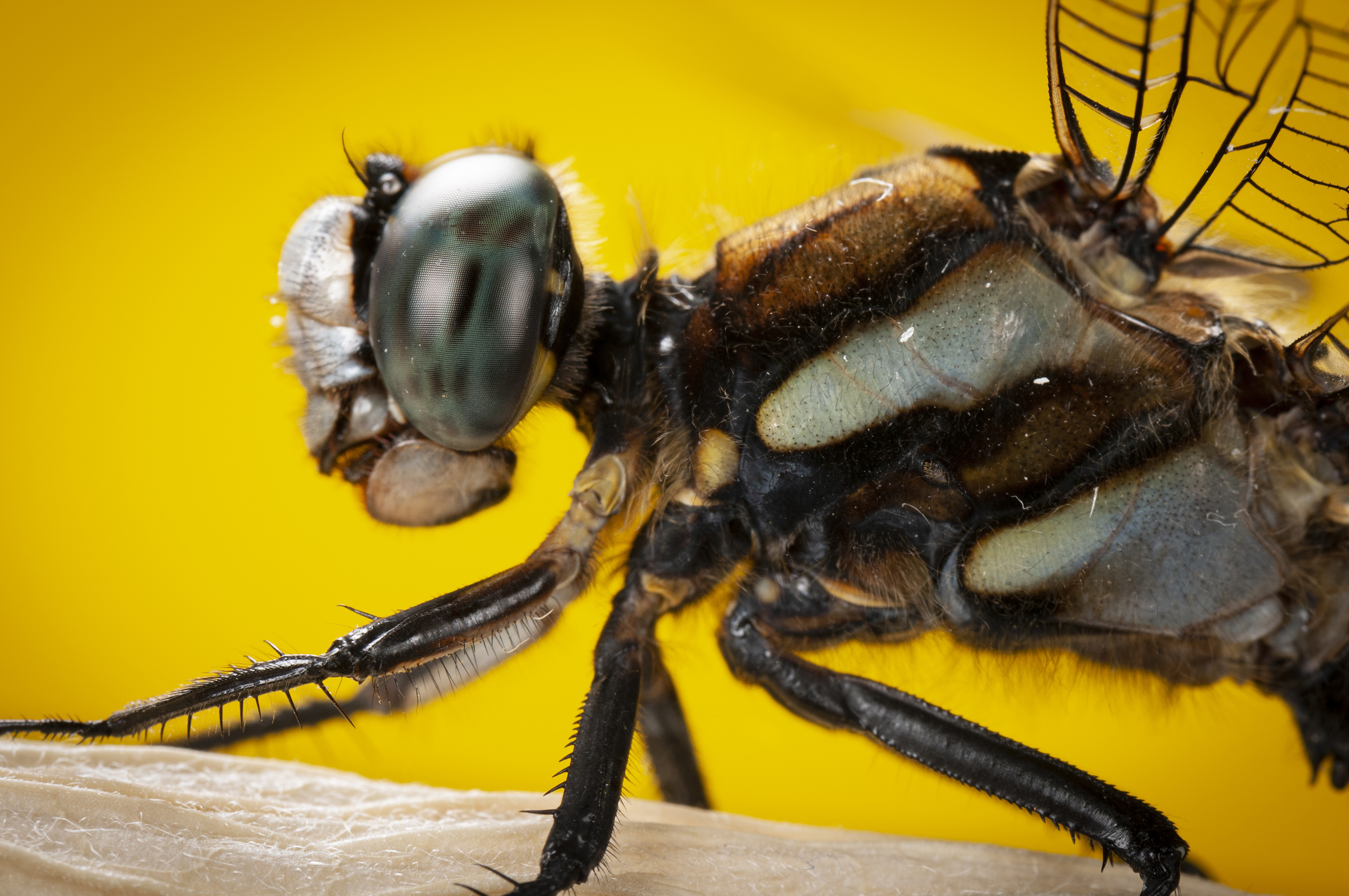
Orthetrum albistylum, Adult, South Korea
