= Upper Waterhay Meadow =

Protected area in Wiltshire, England

Coordinates: 51.642°N 1.903°W

Upper Waterhay Meadow (grid reference SU068937) is a 2.8 hectare biological Site of Special Scientific Interest in north Wiltshire, England, notified in 1971. It lies on the Thames floodplain in Ashton Keynes parish, downstream (east) of Ashton Keynes village and west of the town of Cricklade.

The site is known for the snakeshead fritillary, which occurs predominantly in its less common white form. Since it was bought by Wiltshire Wildlife Trust in 1970, the alluvial grassland has been managed for the benefit of the fritillaries.
