= Swill Brook =

River in Wiltshire, England

Coordinates: 51.63672°N 1.92875°W

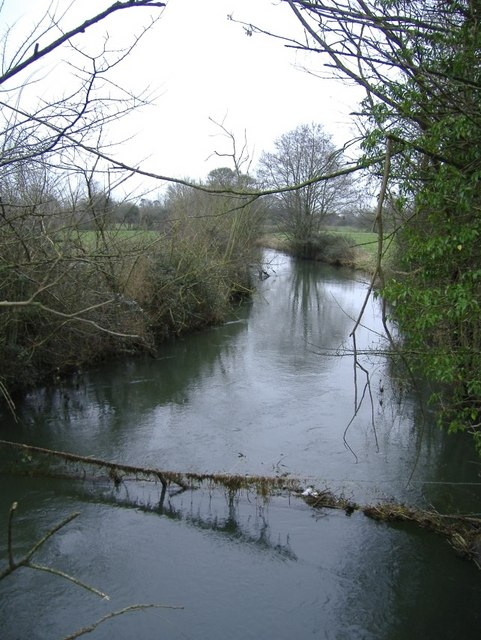
Swill Brook

Swill Brook is the name of a number of streams in England, the most notable of which is the Swill Brook in Wiltshire. This stream flows for some 10 km or 6 miles in a generally easterly direction from its sources near the village of Crudwell to its confluence with the River Thames near Ashton Keynes. Its chief claim to fame is that the Thames is actually a tributary of the Swill Brook, as the latter is considerably larger than the Thames where they meet.
