= Rudloe Manor =

Grade II* listed house in Wiltshire, England

Coordinates: 51.4348°N 2.2283°W

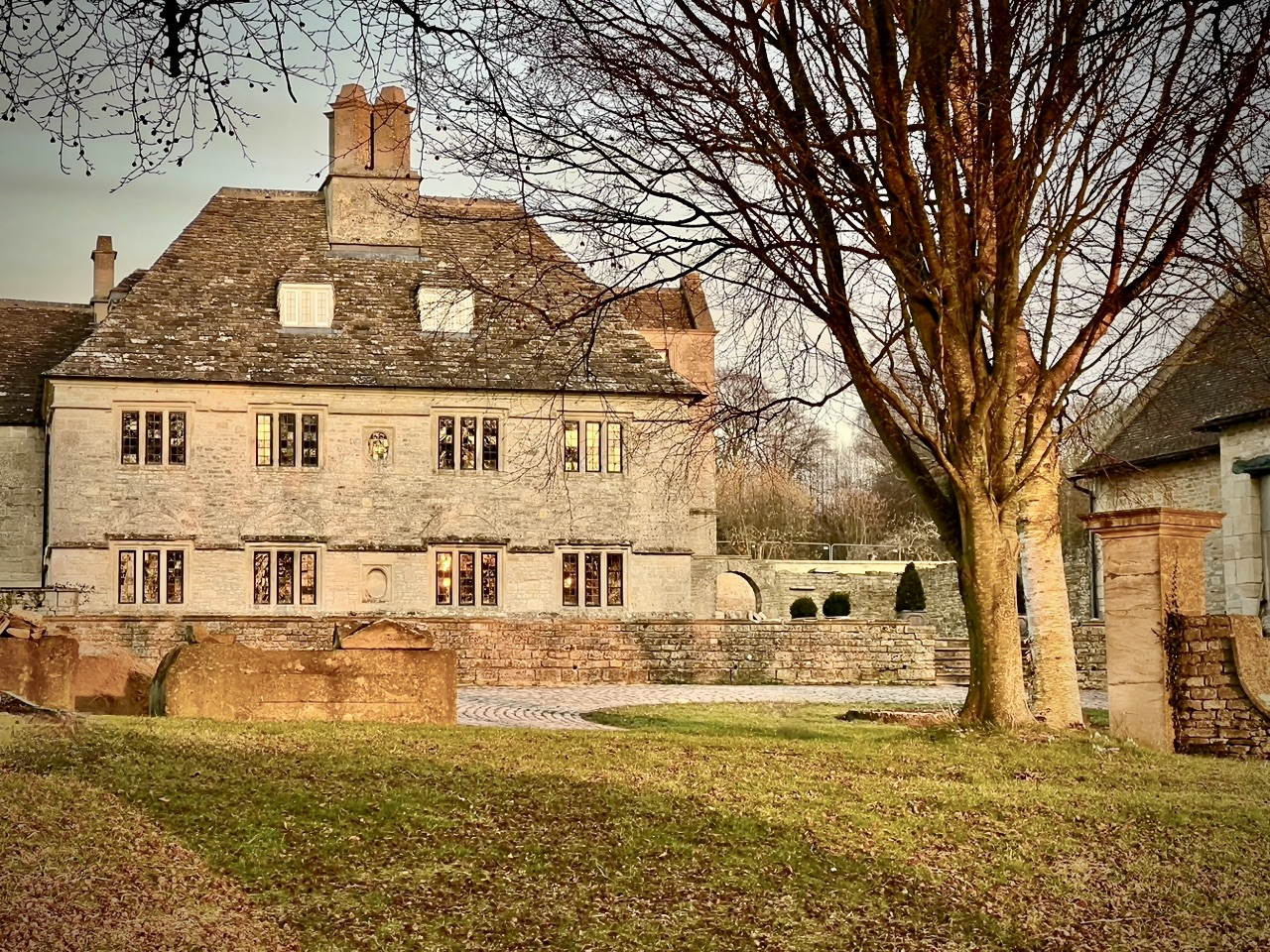
Rudloe Manor, west elevation

Rudloe Manor is a 17th-century Grade II* listed manor house in Box parish, Wiltshire, England.

The Manor stands at the top of Box Hill in Rudloe, on the western outskirts of Corsham, about 7 miles (11 km) north-east of the city of Bath. The Manor is recorded from the early 13th century and was rebuilt in c.1685. Within the curtilage there is a 17th-century multi-bay cart shed, a 12th-century tithe barn and a 17th-century carriage house adjacent to a former granary, along with Grade II listed entrance gates and screen. To the north are the former farm enclosure and stable block.

== History ==
Rudloe Manor dates from the beginning of the 13th century, in the reign of Henry III. A deed made by Bartholomew Bigod of Box granted the Rectory of Box and 'Ryddelow' (Rudloe), including all tithes, to Monkton Farleigh Priory. Courts Baron were held at Rudloe Manor and the Tithe Barn (in Ridlawe in Boxe parish) remained in their hands, separate from the Manor House, until the dissolution of the monasteries in 1539.

=== Medieval ===
The Beauplan family first owned the Manor c. 1216. John Bishop of Riglaze became the owner in 1346, and was succeeded by the Baldwin family of Ridlaw (Rudloe). In 1465, the Manor House, farm and all lands were purchased by Thomas Tropenell (1405–1488) of Great Chalfield, Wiltshire. This period saw the construction of the late medieval wing on the north elevation of the manor and the solar room.

=== 1500–1700 ===
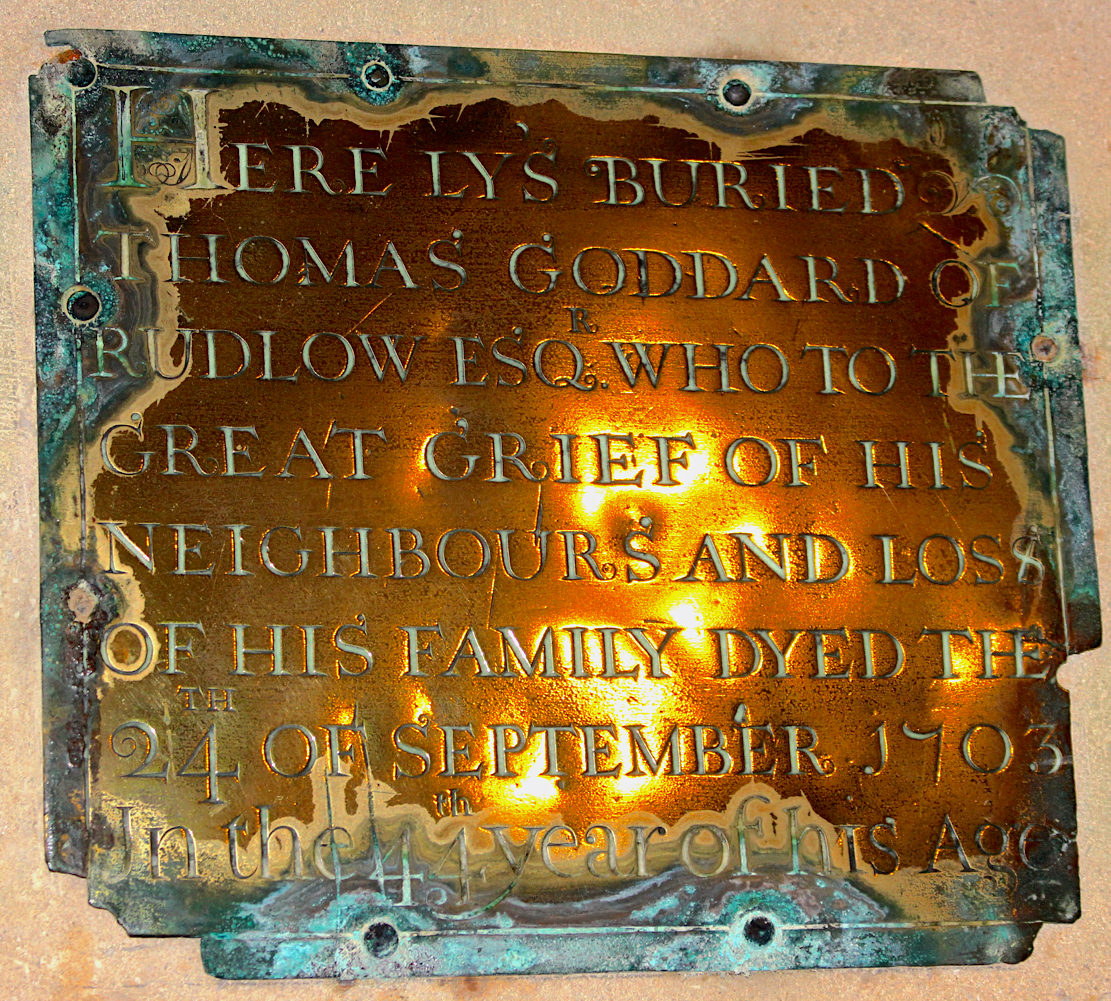
Brass memorial to Thomas Goddard, Box Church

The Leversegge family acquired the estate in 1568 and in 1629 the estate passed to Sir Edward Hungerford (1596–1648) of Farleigh Hungerford Castle, MP and later Sheriff of Wiltshire. His nephew, another Sir Edward, subsequently sold the Manor to Richard Kent of Corsham.

Thomas Goddard then purchased the estate and is credited with rebuilding the Manor House in 1685. He died in 1691, aged 71, and was succeeded by his son, also Thomas, who died in 1703 aged 44. His memorial brass is in Box parish church and states that he was 'Of Rudlow'.

=== 1700–1900 ===
At the turn of the century, the estate was owned by Jacob Selfe of Melksham, who died in 1702, though Thomas Goddard junior was still in occupation. Selfe's descendants intermarried with the Methuen family of Corsham Court, and Rudloe Manor became part of the Methuen estate. At the time of the Tithe Award for Box of 1840, the Manor had a working farm with an extensive range of outbuildings tenanted by Henry Poulson and owned by Henry Hall Joy.

In 1870, Lord Methuen sold Rudloe Manor to Thomas Poynder, and it became part of the Hartham Park Estate. The estate was then held in trust until 1887 for Thomas Poynder's nephew, Sir John Dickson, MP for Chippenham between 1892 and 1910, later created Lord Islington. The majority of the Hartham Park estate was split and sold in 79 lots on 16 May 1918 with an illustrated sale catalogue. Captain Francis Daniell purchased Rudloe Manor which was lot 44: "a charming and fine old manor house, a terraced garden, two cottages, 371 acres". The Corsham-based architect, Sir Harold Brakspear, who specialised in the restoration of historic buildings, then prepared drawings for Captain Daniell, but the scheme was not executed.

In 1928, the estate was owned by Sir Felix Brunner who later restored Grey's Court, Oxfordshire. Plans for extensive alterations and additions were submitted by Rolfe & Peto including upward extension of the main staircase to the second floor, the refitting of the original kitchens and the laying out of the formal gardens. In July 1931, Brunner offered the renovated property for sale by auction in the city of Bath. The Manor was purchased by Countess Pappenheim, the American widow of Maximilian Albrecht, Count von Pappenheim, living in London. The Countess was socially prominent and appeared regularly in the national newspapers at 'high society' engagements including Tatler magazine and awarded prizes at events including the Beaufort Hunt.

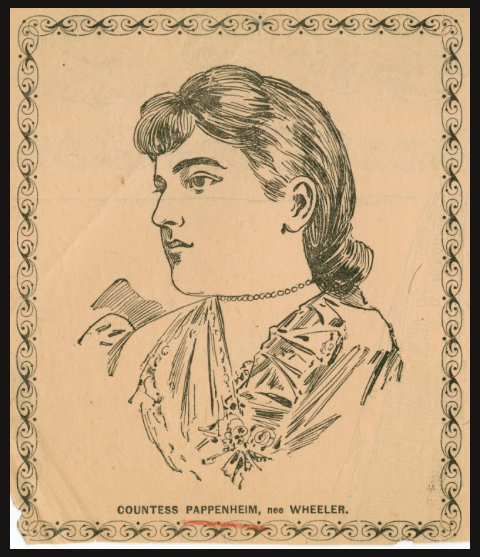
Countess Pappenheim

In 1936 the Manor House passed to her daughter, Countess Raben, a member of a distinguished Danish family, who then lived at Rudloe Manor with her staff. She appeared regularly in the national press alongside royalty, and was responsible for turning the stables and farm buildings into additional bedroom accommodation for her guests, with a link building connecting them to the Manor.

=== World War II ===
In 1941 the estate was sold to the Air Ministry and became RAF Rudloe Manor, serving as sector headquarters for No. 10 Group Fighter Command which protected Western England and was led by Air Vice Marshal Sir Christopher Quentin Brand. As well as utilising the Manor House itself, an operations block was built based around a standard design Operations Room consisting of a balcony overlooking the map table in a 'well' below. The "Ops Room" remained operational until 15 January 1951 when its function was transferred to the underground operations room in Browns Quarry nearby.

The Manor House subsequently became the Headquarters of the RAF Provost & Security Services and Nos. 1 & 1001 Signal Units until November 1998, when these were relocated to RAF Henlow (Bucks). In 1999, the Manor site was decommissioned by the Ministry and the Manor House was placed on the Historic England Heritage at Risk Register.

== 21st century ==
The Manor, Stables, cart shed and outbuildings were sold in three lots by Defence Estates in 2002. In 2010, an enabling consent was granted to safeguard the historic buildings by way of planning permission for nine new-build houses on a previous plantation known as 'Randells Garden' to the north. Essential repair works to the stone tile roof structures were completed in 2012, and in 2016 the cart shed was rebuilt. Between 2002 and 2018, the Manor was subject to many break-ins and urban exploration and its condition continued to deteriorate. It was declared unsafe to enter in 2019.

In 2021, Rudloe Manor and all historic buildings returned into private ownership. The buildings were made safe and urgent works were completed to stabilise the historic fabrics. The Manor underwent a programme of restoration in 2021 to return the site to its original residential use. Working alongside Historic England, Wiltshire Council and the National Archives, Professor Timothy Mowl and Carole Fry completed an extensive period of archival research during 2022, resulting in the document "A History and Structural Development of Rudloe Manor".

=== Gardens ===
Many of the formal gardens were lost with the Air Ministry occupation between 1941 and 1999 on the construction of the operations room and administration blocks within the grounds to the south and west.

The historic orchard was renovated and regenerated in 2021, working alongside the School of Biological Sciences at the University of Bristol, who used genomic tests to identify the historic fanned apple trees. The gardens to the south of the tithe barn and the coach house, including the D-shaped pond to the south, were restored in 2022.
