= Church of St Thomas à Becket, Box =

Church in Wiltshire, England

Church of St Thomas à Becket
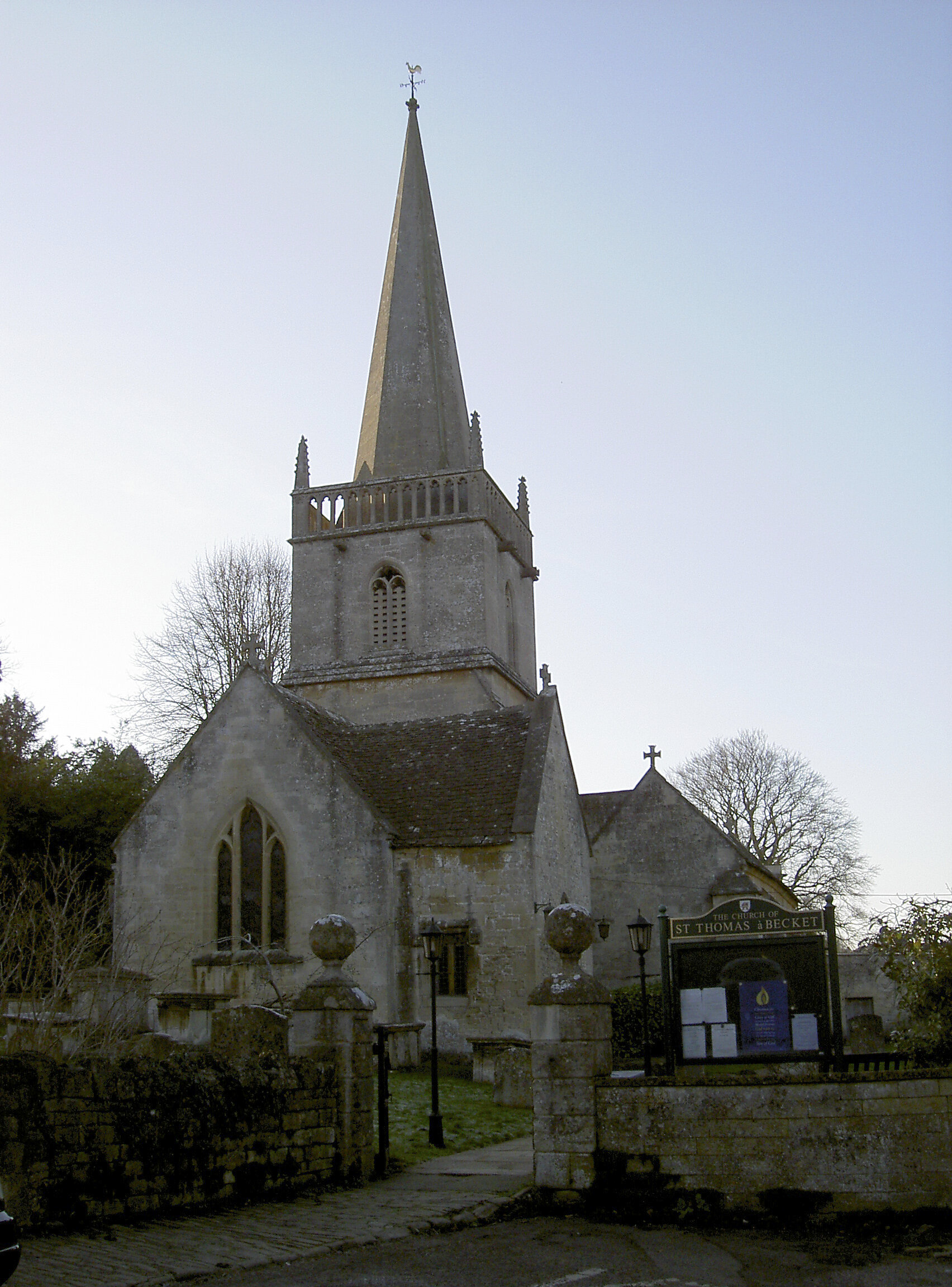
- Church of St Thomas à Becket
- 51.4151°N 2.2558°W
- Denomination: Church of England
- Previous denomination: Roman Catholic

History
- Dedication: St Thomas Becket

Architecture
- Functional status: Parish church
- Heritage designation: Grade I
- Architectural type: Church

Administration
- Diocese: Bristol
- Archdeaconry: Malmesbury
- Deanery: Chippenham
- Parish: Box

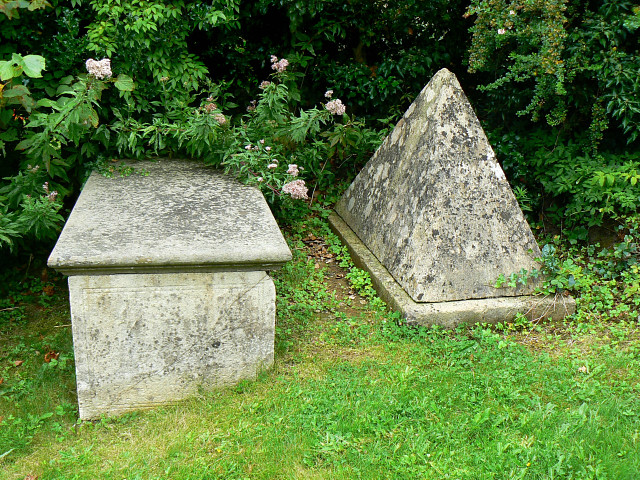
Pyramidal tombstone (right)

The Church of St. Thomas à Becket is the Church of England parish church of Box, Wiltshire, in south-west England. It is one of a number of churches named after Thomas Becket following his martyrdom. The church has 12th-century origins and was substantially remodelled in the 14th, 15th, 18th and 19th centuries. It is a Grade I listed building.

== History and description ==
The church is adjacent to a ruined Roman villa. There was evidence of St Aldhelm working in the area and an Anglo-Saxon church was built, then replaced with a Norman church. There it was given the parish name of Ditchridge. Following the Norman Conquest, King William I gave the land and church to William De Ow. It was rebuilt in 1158–1169 using stone from the nearby Hazelbury quarry.

The church was at first dedicated to the Virgin Mary but following the martyrdom of the Archbishop of Canterbury, Thomas Becket, a small chapel dedicated to him was constructed in 1190. As Box was on the pilgrims' route to the shrine of Becket at Canterbury Cathedral, by the end of the 13th century, the church had been rededicated to him. The chapel was renamed Hazelbury Chapel following the church's re-dedication.

The tower arches and north arcade are 14th-century, as are the two-storey vestry (which was perhaps a priest's house) and the rib vaulted chapel roof. In the 15th century, the tower was heightened and a bell installed; restoration in 1713 included the rebuilding of the chancel.

In 1831, due to the church being too small to meet demand, the Victorians enlarged it; the Bath architect John Pinch the Younger designed the south aisle. In 1896–7 Harold Brakspear carried out a renovation. A porch was added to the vestry, and inside the high pews were removed and lowered, along with the floor. Plaster was removed to reveal hidden memorials and 14th-century encaustic tiles in the chancel, which were also restored. Brakspear designed the reredos and installed the stone pulpit. The restoration cost £3,500 (£400,000 in 2025). The Hazelbury Chapel was restored in 1926. In 1960, English Heritage granted the Church of St Thomas à Becket Grade I listed status.

Julian Orbach, extending Nikolaus Pevsner's description of the church, calls the north-east Hazelbury Chapel "highly unusual". He places the reredos in the east wall of the nave in the 13th century, comparing it to that of c.1240 at Salisbury Cathedral.

The octagonal font is 15th-century. The tower has four bells, one from the same century and another from the 16th. Ellacombe apparatus is fitted to allow them to be rung without a team of bell-ringers. The royal arms of Queen Anne are dated 1714. Monuments include a large garlanded urn and obelisk to Margaret Blow (died 1755), which Orbach calls "exceedingly charming" and states is attributed to the renowned sculptor Henry Cheere.

== Churchyard and cemetery ==
Grave markers in the churchyard date to the seventeenth century. There are numerous mounds in which bodies were buried one atop the other; in keeping with medieval custom, these double burials were always on the south side of a church "as no-one wanted the shadow of the Church to fall on his grave". According to legend, a pyramidal tombstone in the churchyard was contrived to prevent the deceased's wife from dancing on his grave.

Burials in the churchyard slowed to a trickle after the opening of the Box cemetery in 1858. The 1857 cemetery chapel, rectangular in plan with a north-west needle spire, is described as "unusually elaborate Gothic" by Historic England; it has stonework in contrasting colours and highly carved window tracery. The lodge at the entrance to the cemetery is of the same date and in similar style.

== Parish ==
At some point the benefice was united with Hazlebury and Ditteridge, although the parishes remain distinct. Today the parish is part of the Lidbrook Group, which also covers St John's church at Colerne.

Rev. I. W. W. Horlock, vicar, built Box House c.1810–1820 for his own use: a substantial three-storey house with a pair of Ionic columns in front of an arched front door, surrounded by gardens. His son Rev. H Horlock continued to use it as the vicarage until his retirement in 1874; the house and later extensions are now used as offices. A mid-19th century house on Church Lane, also with three storeys, was then bought and continues in use as the vicarage.

== Notable burials ==
- Sir Hugh Speke, 1st Baronet (1661)
- Sir George Speke, 2nd Baronet (1683)
