= Hazelbury =

Hazelbury can refer to:

- Hazelbury Bryan, village in Dorset, England
- Hazelbury Manor, manor house in Hazelbury, Wiltshire
- Hazelbury, Wiltshire, a hamlet in Wiltshire, England
