= Colerne =

Village and civil parish in Wiltshire, England

Coordinates: 51.439°N 2.262°W

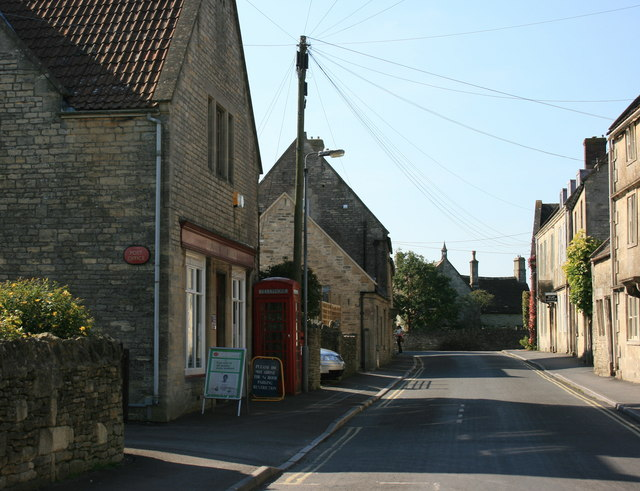
- Colerne High Street in 2008

- Location within Wiltshire
- Population: 2,701 (in 2021)
- OS grid reference: ST819711
- Civil parish: Colerne
- Unitary authority: Wiltshire
- Ceremonial county: Wiltshire
- Region: South West
- Country: England
- Sovereign state: United Kingdom
- Post town: CHIPPENHAM
- Postcode district: SN14
- Dialling code: 01225
- Police: Wiltshire
- Fire: Dorset and Wiltshire
- Ambulance: South Western
- UK Parliament: Melksham and Devizes
- Website: Parish Council

Colerne is a village and civil parish in north Wiltshire, England. The village is about 3.5 miles (6 km) west of the town of Corsham and 7 miles (11 km) northeast of the city of Bath. It has an elevated and exposed position, 545 feet (166 m) above sea level, and overlooks the Box valley to the south (where Brunel's Box Tunnel is).

The parish includes the hamlets of Eastrip and Thickwood. It is bounded to the west by a stretch of the Fosse Way Roman road, which forms the county boundary with Gloucestershire, and to the east by the Bybrook River. Part of the northern boundary is the Doncombe Brook, a tributary of the Bybrook, and part of the southern boundary is the Lid Brook, another tributary.

== History ==
Evidence of early settlement in the area includes three bowl barrows near Thickwood, overlooking the Bybrook valley, and an Iron Age hillfort from around 100 BC in the north of the parish, known as Bury Wood Camp, overlooking the Doncombe valley.

A Roman villa has been found on the site of the present airfield. The 1086 Domesday Book recorded 28 households at Colerne and six at Thickwood. The enclosure known as Colerne Park (today largely woodland) was created in the early 14th century by William of Colerne, Abbot of Malmesbury.

In the 14th century the local economy was based on sheep-rearing, cloth production (assisted by mills on the By Brook) and stone quarrying. The former farmhouse known as Daubenys, on the High Street, is a Grade II* listed long house from c. 1400.

The Manor House, near the church, bears a date of 1689; it was reduced in size and re-fronted in 1900. The country house at Lucknam Park is also from the late 17th century. Many houses in the village are from the 18th century, partly as a result of a large fire of 1774.

By the 19th century, cloth-making had migrated to industrial towns and the economy was mainly agricultural. Some of the watermills were converted to paper production, an example being Chapps Mill near Slaughterford. In the 1840s many labourers were employed on the construction of the Great Western Railway and its Box Tunnel.

From 1995 to 2023, Calder House School was a private special school at Thickwood, which was attended by up to 48 pupils aged 7 to 13 for two or three years while receiving remedial support before returning to mainstream education. The school was built around the former farmyard at Thickwood House, a 17th-century former farmhouse.

=== RAF and Army ===
From 1939, employment was provided by the construction of RAF Colerne close to the north of the village. After the war, the site continued in use by maintenance units, and then Transport Command and No. II Squadron RAF Regiment until its closure in 1976. The site was taken over by the Army, named Azimghur Barracks, and became the headquarters of 21 Signal Regiment; this change led to a noticeable drop in the parish population. The airfield continues to be used by Air Training Corps cadets and No. 3 Air Experience Flight.

== Religious sites ==
=== Parish church ===
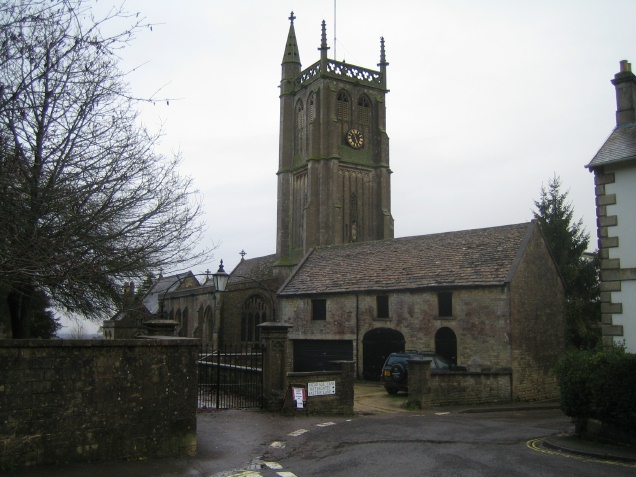
Parish church, with 18th-century barn in foreground

The Church of England parish church of St John the Baptist dates from the early 13th century but was heavily restored in the 19th century. 13th-century features can be seen in the nave arcades, the north arcade being of slightly later date. The aisles and the tall west tower were added in the 15th century. The 13th-century chancel and north-east chapel were largely rebuilt in the restoration of 1875–1877, and at the same time the clerestory and roof of the nave were renewed. Further work in 1877 added a vestry.

Set into the north wall of the nave are a small carved figure of c.1200 and pieces of a cross shaft which Pevsner and Orbach describe as "two large fragments of one of the best 8th-9th century crosses in the West Country". A tomb-chest with a marble effigy by H. H. Armstead is that of Richard Walmesley (1816–1893) of Lucknam Park.

The tower has a one-handed clock. The peal of eight includes bells from the 16th to 19th centuries, and there is an 1853 sanctus bell. In 1960 the church was designated as Grade I listed. In the churchyard are an unusually large number of Grade II listed tombs and a churchyard cross, designed in the early 20th century by Harold Brakspear along the lines of the fragments inside the church.

Between the church and Vicarage Lane, the former rectory coach-house which was converted from an 18th-century barn has pieces of medieval carved stonework in its east wall, inserted during the Victorian restoration. Nearby at the south-east corner of the Market Place is the 1842 rectory, faced in stucco with ashlar dressings.

Today the parish is part of the Lidbrook group, which also covers St Thomas à Becket, Box and St Christopher, Ditteridge.

=== Others ===
A Congregational chapel was built in 1824 and renovated in 1924. In 1974 it became Colerne Evangelical Church and joined the Fellowship of Independent Evangelical Churches.

In 1867 Providence Strict Baptist Chapel was opened in Colerne. The building fell into disuse in 1986 and is now a private residence.

A Primitive Methodist chapel was built in Colerne in 1895 and closed in 1984. An earlier small Methodist chapel was built at Thickwood in 1860 but was demolished in 1904.

== Memorials ==
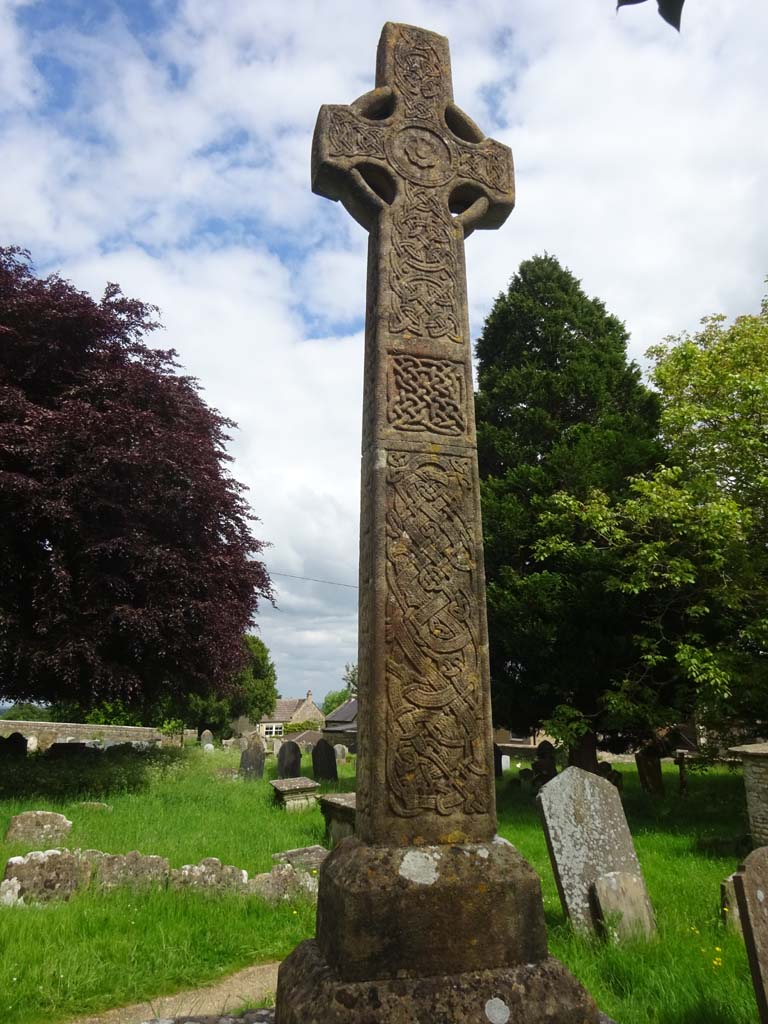
Churchyard Cross, Colerne

In the centre of the Market Place, in a triangular enclosure bounded by iron railings, is a tall stone column carrying a sundial: a memorial to Richard Walmesley (1816–1893) of Lucknam Park. Nearby is the parish war memorial, a cross on an octagonal shaft, erected in 1920 to commemorate those killed in the First World War and with names later added from the second. A Celtic cross in the churchyard, mounted on medieval steps, was designed in the early 20th century by Harold Brakspear.

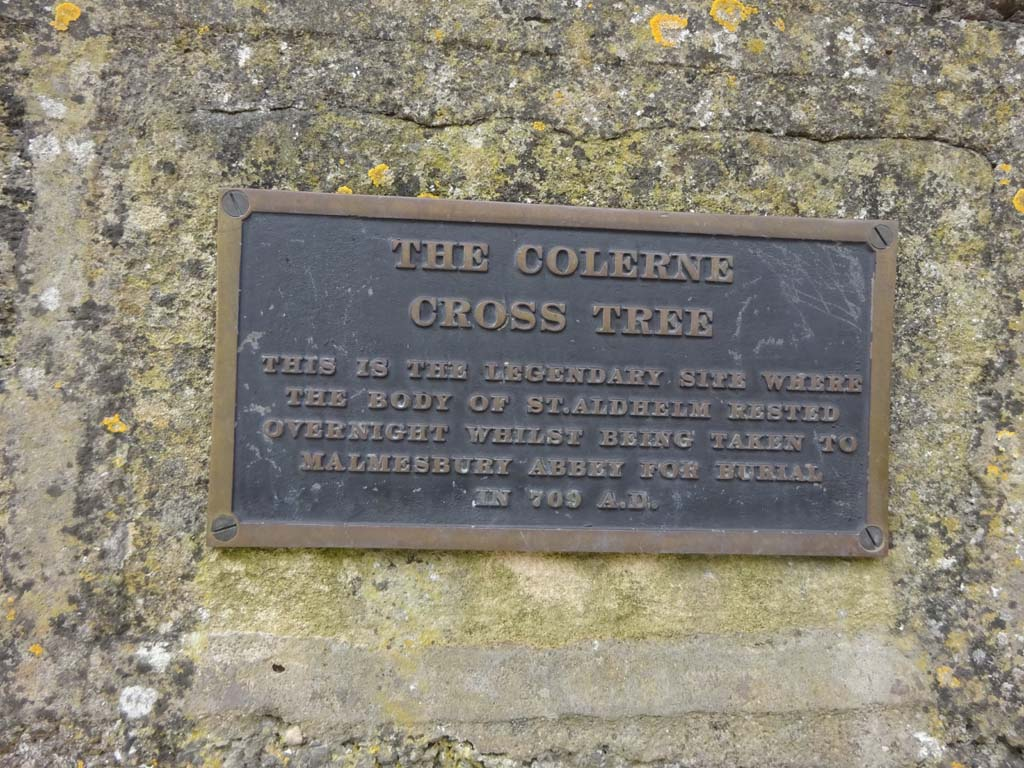
plaque on the raised bed holding "the Colerne Holy Cross Tree"

To the south of the war memorial is a raised, stone walled, bed occupied by one tree. A small bronze plaque states: "The Colerne Cross Tree. This is the legendary site where the body of St Aldhelm rested overnight whilst being taken to Malmesbury Abbey for burial in 709 A.D.".

== Modern Colerne ==
Colerne's historic core sits on a high ridge, though some of its stone-built houses are located down the valley side to the south. Modern estates were built to the north of the ancient, narrow streets, and there is some modern infill. Thickwood is a separate development of mainly late-20th century houses, 1 mile (1.6 km) to the north-east.

Colerne CE Primary School serves the village. Its building was opened in 1965 to replace a small National School of 1853, near the church. Pupil numbers were high while the school served families from RAF Colerne, and classrooms at the old school remained in use until the RAF station closed in 1976. In 2015 the old school was in use by a pre-school playgroup.

Colerne Rugby Football Club plays in the Counties 2 Tribute Dorset & Wilts North league.

The village has two pubs, both housed in early 18th-century buildings: the Fox and Hounds and the Six Bells Inn. There is a village hall and several shops with one housing the village's Post Office.

The Lucknam Park Hotel, originally a Georgian country house but much expanded in the Victorian era, is around 1 mile (1.6 km) north of the village, near Thickwood. The hotel is set within a 500-acre (200 ha) estate and has an equestrian centre.

Colerne Park and Monk's Wood is a Site of Special Scientific Interest, south and east of the village. On the north-east edge of the village, Frank's Wood was planted in 2000 by the Woodland Trust.

== Weather ==
As the "Village on the Hill", Colerne is in an exposed position and local people are well aware that the weather will often be the opposite of that in nearby, but low-lying, Bath. Colerne tends to be windy and rainy in winter and is prone to becoming cut off from the outside world when it snows. It can often be foggy when the lower-lying towns and villages around are not.

== Toponym ==
The name Colerne appears in the Domesday Book of 1086. Other early spellings include Culerna, Culerne, Cullerne, Collern. Various interpretations of the name have been proposed. Gover, Mawer and Stenton, in The Place Names of Wiltshire, cite a form aern meaning "house", and suggest that "col-aern might well denote a house where charcoal was made, used or stored." Alternatively, the altitude of the village suggests that the first syllable may be from the Welsh or Cornish word col, "peak"; this would mean the "dwelling on the peak". Another possibility is that it could mean "cold dwelling", from the Anglo-Saxon cald.

Yet another possible derivation is from the Goidelic (Old Irish) cuillean, the Brythonic (Welsh) celyn or celynnen, or the Old English holegn (with the 'h' being pronounced gutturally). Each of these words translates as "holly tree" or "holly branches", which were significant in Celtic history and folklore.

== Local government ==
Colerne civil parish is administered by a parish council and by the Wiltshire Council unitary authority.

== Notable people ==
- William Grocyn (c. 1446–1519), scholar and friend of Erasmus
- Thomas Norton (c. 1436–1513), medieval English alchemist, poet, and gentleman of Edward IV's privy chamber was born in Colerne.
- Derek Fowlds (1937–2020), actor (Yes Minister; straight man to Basil Brush) was a resident of the village.
- Brian Ashton (b. 1946), rugby union player and England coach from late 2006 to April 2008, was a former resident of the village.
- Goldfrapp (b. 1959 & b. 1966), the electronic music duo, were former residents of the village.
- Kristan Bromley (b. 1972) and Shelley Rudman (b. 1981), champion skeleton racers, are former residents of Colerne.

== Three Shire Stones ==
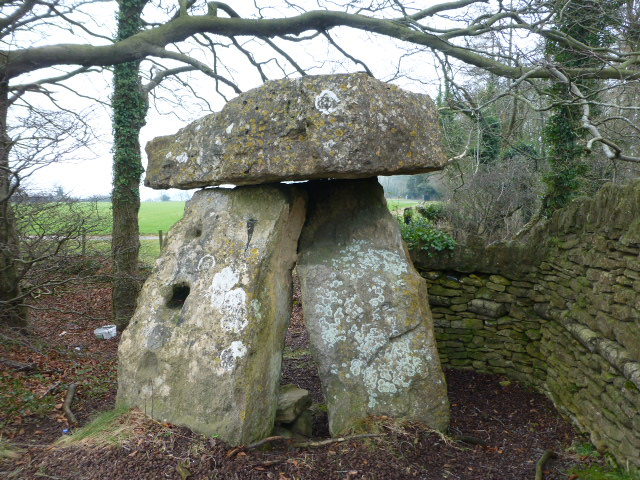
The Three Shire Stones

The counties of Wiltshire, Gloucestershire and Somerset meet in the far southwest of the parish, on the Fosse Way towards Batheaston. The Three Shire Stones, made from coarsely cut stone slabs, mark this point. This marker was erected in 1736 and rebuilt in 1859.

== Water tower ==
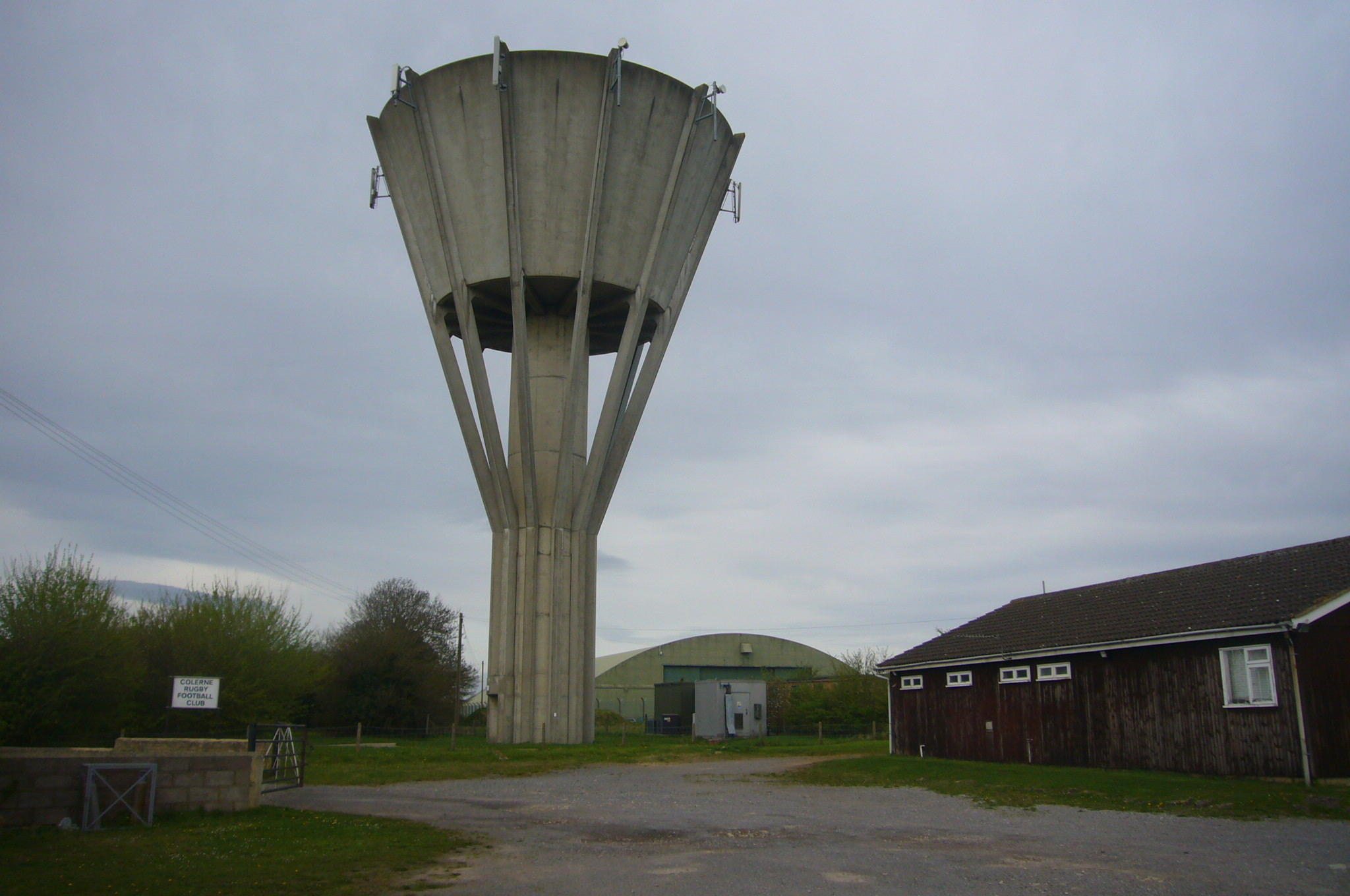
Present water tower

The Colerne Water Tower is a large concrete structure on the southern edge of Colerne Airfield, in the shape of an inverted cone. It is approximately 30 metres (100 ft) high, and replaced an older tower that was part of a 1930s scheme to bring mains water to the area.

The original tower was located on the eastern edge of the village near the housing estate called Martins Croft (built in the late 1940s-early '50s). The Colerne History Group's book, The Village on the Hill, Vol. 1, tells the story of this project. In 2005, housing was built on the site of the original tower and that development is called Tower Close.
