= Alcombe =

Alcombe may refer to two places in England:

- Alcombe, Somerset, a suburb of Minehead, Somerset
- Alcombe, Wiltshire, a hamlet in the parish of Box, Wiltshire
