= Coles Farm =

Grade II* listed Cotswold house in Box, Wiltshire, England

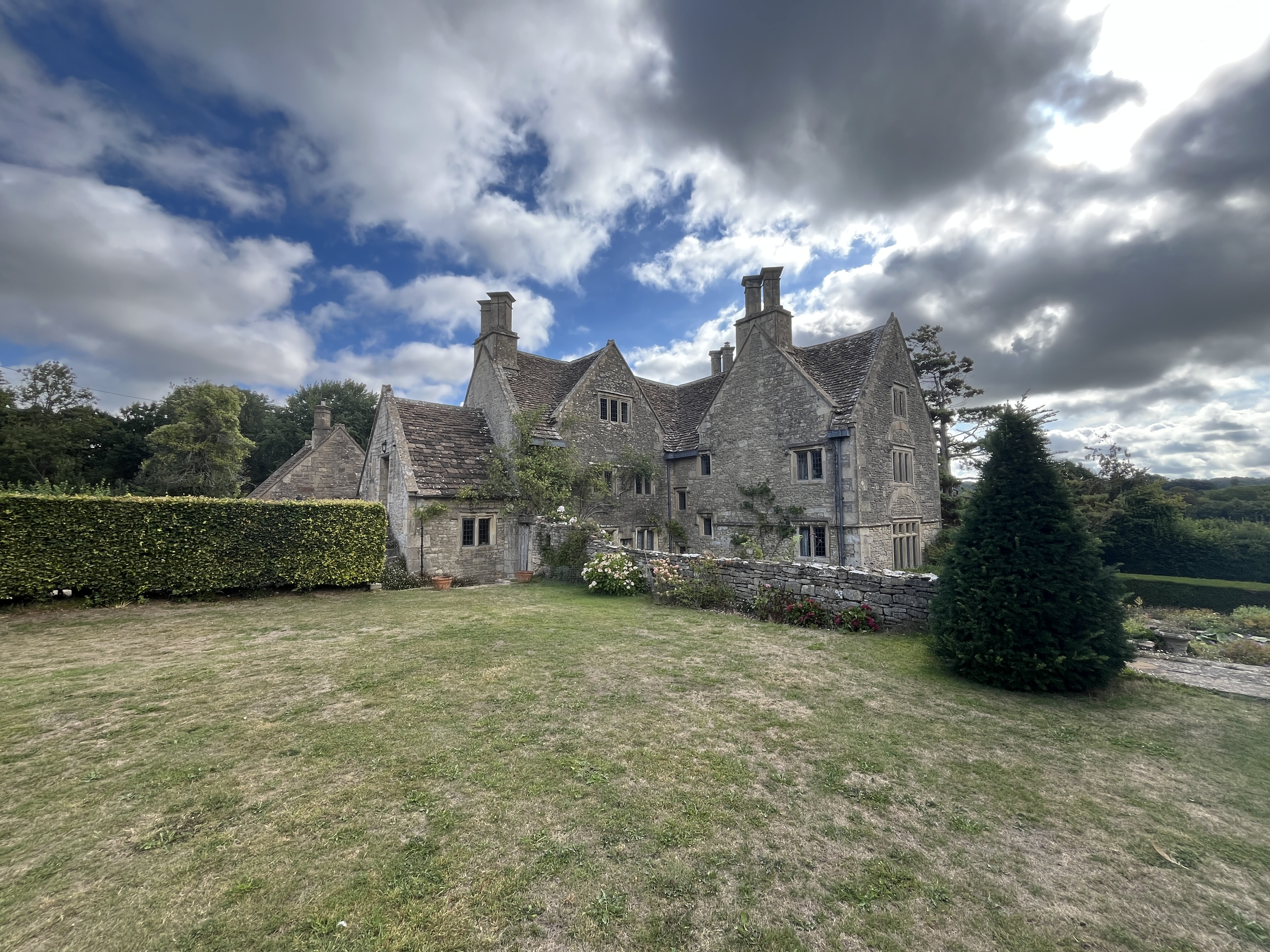
- Coles Farm, Alcombe, Wiltshire

- Location within Wiltshire
- 51.4215°N 2.2729°W
- Location: Alcombe, Box, Wiltshire, England

History
- Built: Early 17th century; parlour wing added c. 1645–1649
- Built for: Peter Webb

Site notes
- Architectural style: Cotswold vernacular
- Owner: Private

Listed Building – Grade II*
- Official name: Coles Farmhouse
- Designated: 20 December 1960
- Reference no.: 1022715

Coles Farm is a 17th-century house in the Cotswolds, in the hamlet of Alcombe near the village of Box in Wiltshire, England, about 5 miles (8.0 km) north-east of Bath. Built of local limestone in the Cotswold vernacular, with mullioned windows, coped gables and a stone-tiled roof, it is a Grade II* listed building, recorded in the National Heritage List for England as Coles Farmhouse.

The house was built and enlarged in the 17th century for the Webb family, prominent local yeoman farmers, who owned it until 1913. After a period of dereliction around 1900 it was restored, and during the 20th century it passed through a series of owners.

== Name ==
The name "Coles" is older than the present house and is thought to derive from a 14th-century owner of the land, believed to be a Robert Cole recorded in 1362. The building is listed by Historic England as Coles Farmhouse, but local histories, early maps and the property's owners have generally called it Coles Farm. For a short period in the 1970s it was renamed Falconers, and on the Ordnance Survey map of 1919 it appears as Old Farm, before the name Coles Farm was restored.

== Location ==
Coles Farm stands at Alcombe, a hamlet in the north-west of the parish of Box, on high ground above the valley of the By Brook. The surrounding countryside lies within the Cotswolds National Landscape, a designated Area of Outstanding Natural Beauty. The parish is administered by Wiltshire Council.

== History ==
=== Origins and the Webb family ===
The Webbs were among the most significant families in the area, recorded in the nearby parish of Ditteridge from the late 16th century. Peter Webb, a yeoman farmer, bought land at Coles and Rudloe in about 1633, possibly from the Hungerford estate; a rate assessment of 1628 lists him among the largest landholders in Box.

The earliest part of the house is the range facing the road, which may date from the early 17th century and could have stood on the site before Webb's purchase. Webb enlarged the property in the late 1640s, adding a rear ("parlour") wing with a cellar beneath and a new stair hall, reflecting his rising status. The plaster frieze in the parlour is dated 1649, and a cartouche on the road front reads "PW 1646" for Peter Webb; a second datestone reads "E/S 1685", probably marking a later marriage in the family. Despite a long-standing tradition that Coles Farm was the dower house of nearby Cheyney Court, no documentary evidence supports this, and the house appears always to have been a working farmhouse rather than a manor house.

=== Tenanted farm and decline ===
From at least the early 19th century the Webbs let the farm to tenants while continuing to own it. The 1838 tithe map records it in the ownership of Edward Webb and occupied by the farmer Thomas Rawlings, and in 1848 James Tunstall noted that the gabled house, "belonging to the family of Webb", was by then let as summer lodgings. Later tenants farmed up to 140 acres (57 ha).

Towards the end of the 19th century the house fell empty and into decay, and was recorded as uninhabited in the 1901 and 1911 censuses. In 1894 S. John Elyard included it in Some Old Wiltshire Homes, and in 1907 Allan Fea described it as "fast falling to decay", with broken windows and panelled rooms open to the weather. The empty house was used as a setting in Mary Deane's novel The Rose-Spinner (1904). A tangle of mortgages and divided family inheritance after the death of Anthony Edward Webb in 1885 had made the property difficult to sell.

=== Twentieth century ===
In 1913 the house was sold out of the Webb family and was subsequently restored; by 1914 a guidebook praised its panelled ground-floor room with no mention of neglect. Owners in the 1920s and 1930s entertained on a large scale and made internal alterations. After further changes of ownership, in July 1972 it was auctioned for £85,000 and bought by Lady Juliet de Chair (née Fitzwilliam), formerly the wife of Victor Hervey, 6th Marquess of Bristol; she carried out extensive alterations, built a swimming pool with a falcon mosaic, and briefly renamed the house Falconers. In 1981 it was bought by the businessman Colin Marshall, later chairman of British Airways, who sold it the following year to new owners who restored the name Coles Farm. The house has since remained in private ownership.

According to local rumour, the original carved stone fireplace in the parlour was bought by a wealthy American visitor in the 1930s and shipped to the United States, though this is unverified; the present parlour fireplace is a 20th-century replica.

== Architecture ==
Coles Farm is built of rubble limestone with a stone-tile roof, coped gables and paired diagonal end stacks. It is of two and a half storeys with attics, on an L-shaped plan, and has recessed ovolo-moulded mullioned windows with hood moulds. The range facing the road, the earliest part, has two gables bearing the datestones; the rear parlour wing of the late 1640s adjoins it at right angles. A former agricultural building at the west end, reached by an external stone staircase and lit by lancet windows, is thought to have been a granary with a hayloft over, though its ecclesiastical-looking window has prompted speculation that it was once a chapel.

Inside, the house retains chamfered beams and several 17th-century stone fireplaces. The former kitchen has an unusual wide segmental-arched fireplace of a type known as a "Yorkshire arch", paralleled at nearby Hill House Farm; the hall has a depressed-arched fireplace. The dog-leg staircase has flat balusters and acorn finials. The parlour preserves a 17th-century plaster frieze of griffins flanking shields and a decorated plaster ceiling dated 1649, recorded in drawings by Herbert Hall published in 1903 and in J. A. Gotch's The Growth of the English House (1909). The house was noted by Nikolaus Pevsner in his Wiltshire volume of The Buildings of England.

The curtilage includes a 19th-century stable and coach house and a former cowshed, later adapted as a pool house; neither is separately listed.

== Listed status ==
Coles Farm was listed at Grade II* on 20 December 1960 (list entry number 1022715), a grade reserved for buildings of more than special interest. Its significance is considered to lie chiefly in the survival of its 17th-century footprint and external form, together with the parlour decoration, original fireplaces and staircase.
