= Blue Vein =

Hamlet in Wiltshire, England

- Hamlet
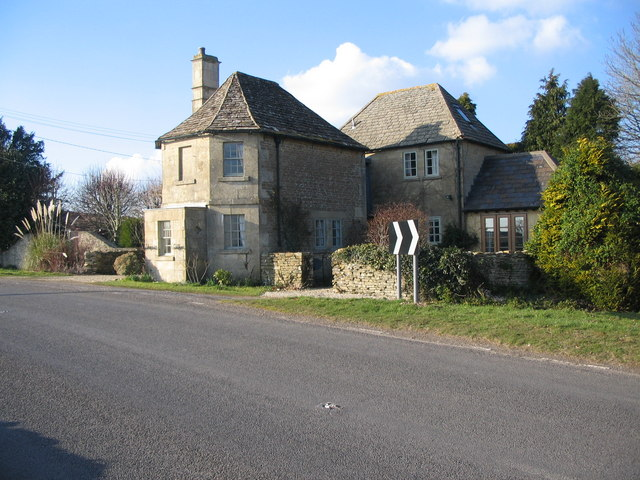
- The Old Toll Cottage in Blue Vein

- Location of Blue Vein in Wiltshire
- Coordinates: 51.4046°N 2.2435°W
- Country: United Kingdom
- Division: England
- County: Wiltshire

Blue Vein is a hamlet about 1 mile (1.6 km) south of Box, Wiltshire, England.

Originally a farm, it lies on what was once the principal road between Bath and London. In the 18th century this was converted into a toll road, and a turnpike was placed at Blue Vein with a two-story house – still standing – constructed to house the toll collector. The Bricker's Barn Trust constructed a London-Bath turnpike route further north in 1761 (now the A4). In the mid-19th century a connecting road was built between the two routes just east of Blue Vein, and the southern route fell out of favour.

In the 18th century the Blue Vein turnpike marked the end of the Lacock Turnpike Trust's road from Lacock, before travellers had to cross the open ground of Kingsdown towards the Bath Trust's road into Bathford. This place was renowned for robberies by highwaymen such as John Poulter. In 1737 the Horse and Jockey Inn was built 300 yards down the road to the south-east, where wealthy travellers could stay, and be met and escorted safely to Bath.

Halfway between Blue Vein and the former inn, now known as Old Jockey, lie three Bronze Age round barrows on the north side of the road.

Blue Vein Farmhouse, built of rubble stone, dates from the 17th century.
