= Blue Veins =

Blue Veins may refer to:

- "Blue Veins", a song by The Raconteurs on their 2006 album Broken Boy Soldiers
- Blue Veins (Pakistan), a women's health advocacy group
- Blue Veins (TV series), a 2016 Hong Kong vampire series

== See also ==
- Blue Vein, a hamlet in Wiltshire, England
