= Chapel Plaister =

Hamlet in west Wiltshire, England

Coordinates: 51.4095°N 2.2313°W

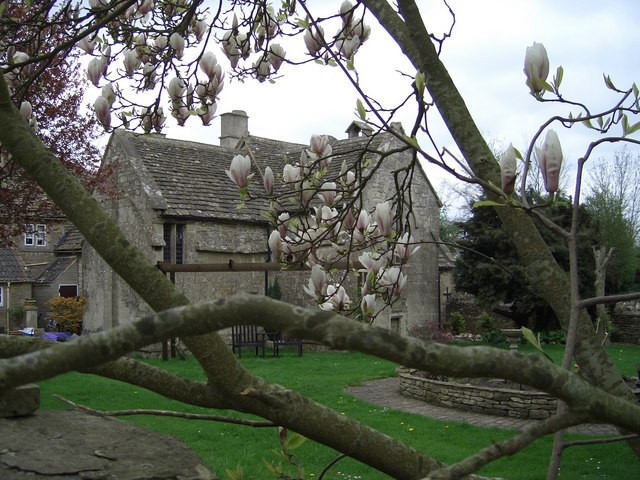
- 15th-century chapel and hospice

- Location within Wiltshire
- OS grid reference: ST840678
- Civil parish: Box
- Unitary authority: Wiltshire
- Ceremonial county: Wiltshire
- Region: South West
- Country: England
- Sovereign state: United Kingdom
- Police: Wiltshire
- Fire: Dorset and Wiltshire
- Ambulance: South Western
- UK Parliament: Melksham & Devizes

Chapel Plaister /ˈtʃæpəl ˈplɑːstər/ is a hamlet in west Wiltshire, England. It lies on the B3109 road between Corsham and Bradford on Avon, about 1 mile (1.6 km) south-east of the village of Box and 2.5 miles (4 km) south-west of the town of Corsham.

The settlement takes its name from a small Anglican church which was a roadside refuge for pilgrims travelling to the shrine of Joseph of Arimathea at Glastonbury. Founded circa 1235 and rebuilt in 1340 by Richard Plaisted of Castle Combe, it was dependent on the now lost parish church of Hazelbury, about half a mile to the north-west. In the 15th century the whole building was raised, the west porch added, and the nave and transept made two-storeyed; the nave was used as the hospice for travellers, and the chancel for services. Restoration was carried out in 1893 and 1999. The building was designated as Grade I listed in 1960. Today the church is within the area of the benefice of Box with Hazelbury and Ditteridge.

The adjacent Bell House, an inn from the 17th century and now a private house, may have incorporated a hostel connected with the chapel.
