= Box, Wiltshire =

Village in Wiltshire, England

Coordinates: 51.415°N 2.252°W

Box
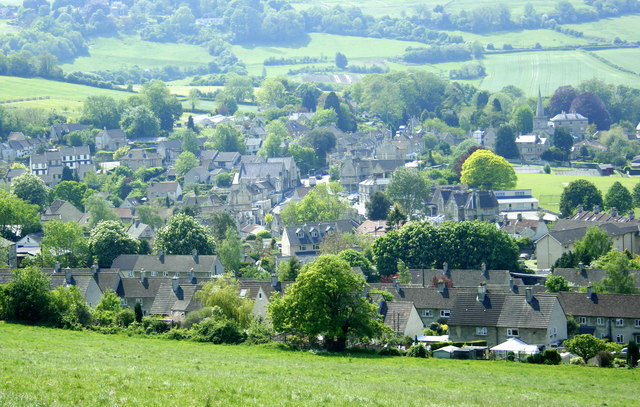
- Box from Quarry Hill, 2008

- Location within Wiltshire
- Population: 4,404 (2021 census)
- OS grid reference: ST826685
- Civil parish: Box
- Unitary authority: Wiltshire
- Ceremonial county: Wiltshire
- Region: South West
- Country: England
- Sovereign state: United Kingdom
- Post town: CORSHAM
- Postcode district: SN13
- Dialling code: 01225
- Police: Wiltshire
- Fire: Dorset and Wiltshire
- Ambulance: South Western
- UK Parliament: Melksham and Devizes (Rudloe: Chippenham)
- Website: Parish Council

Box is a large village and civil parish within the Cotswolds Area of Outstanding Natural Beauty in Wiltshire, England, about 3 miles (5 km) west of Corsham and 5 miles (8 km) northeast of Bath. Box also falls in the easternmost part of the Avon Green Belt. Besides the village of Box, the parish includes the villages of Ashley and Box Hill; Hazelbury manor; and the hamlets of Alcombe, Blue Vein, Chapel Plaister, Ditteridge, Henley, Kingsdown, Middlehill, and Wadswick. To the east the parish includes much of Rudloe, formerly a hamlet but now a housing estate, and the defence establishments and related businesses on the site of the former RAF Rudloe Manor.

Occupation here dates back at least to Roman times. The area is known for its fine stone, and for centuries Box quarries were famous for their product. Today Box is perhaps better known for its Brunel-designed Box railway tunnel.

Box has been twinned with Sorigny, a commune in central France, since 2016.

== Geography ==
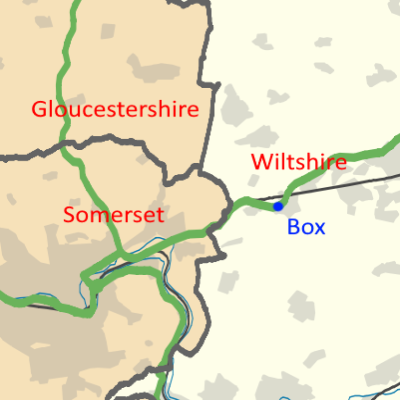
Position of Box in Wiltshire

Box lies in Wiltshire, close to the boundaries with Somerset (roughly 1.0 mile (1.6 km) away as the crow flies) and Gloucestershire (about 1.9 miles (3.1 km) away). The place where the three counties meet is marked by the Three Shire Stones.

The settlements in Box are on higher ground above the steep-sided valley of the Bybrook River, a tributary of the Bristol Avon. Limestone rock is found in much of the parish. Box Ground, a hard-wearing variety of Bath stone, was extracted at quarries such as Box Mine which are now closed. By 2015, the remaining source of Box Ground was Hartham Park quarry at Corsham.

The parish boundary follows the Bybrook in the north-east, and its tributary the Lid Brook in the north-west. The southern boundary of the parish follows the Roman road from Silchester to Bath. The road through Box village, descending to Bathford and Bath, was turnpiked in 1761 to provide a route from Chippenham and Corsham to Bath; this became the present A4.

== History ==
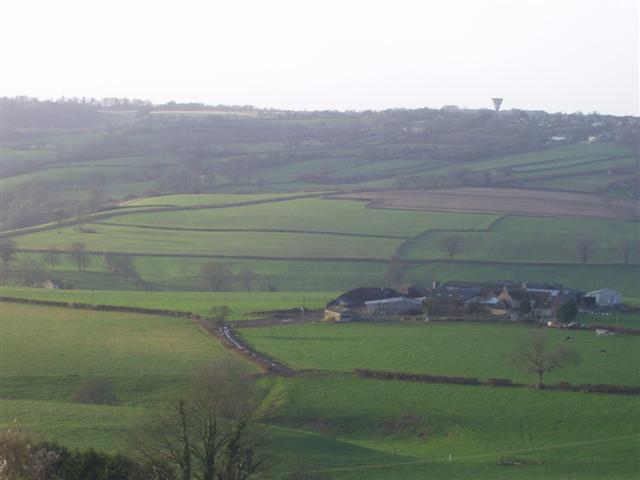
View from Box Hill with Colerne Water Tower visible on the horizon, 2007

Prehistoric settlements in the area were hilltop forts such as Bury Camp, 4 miles (6 km) north of present-day Box village. There is evidence in the form of numerous re-used standing stones that there may have been a stone circle on Kingsdown.

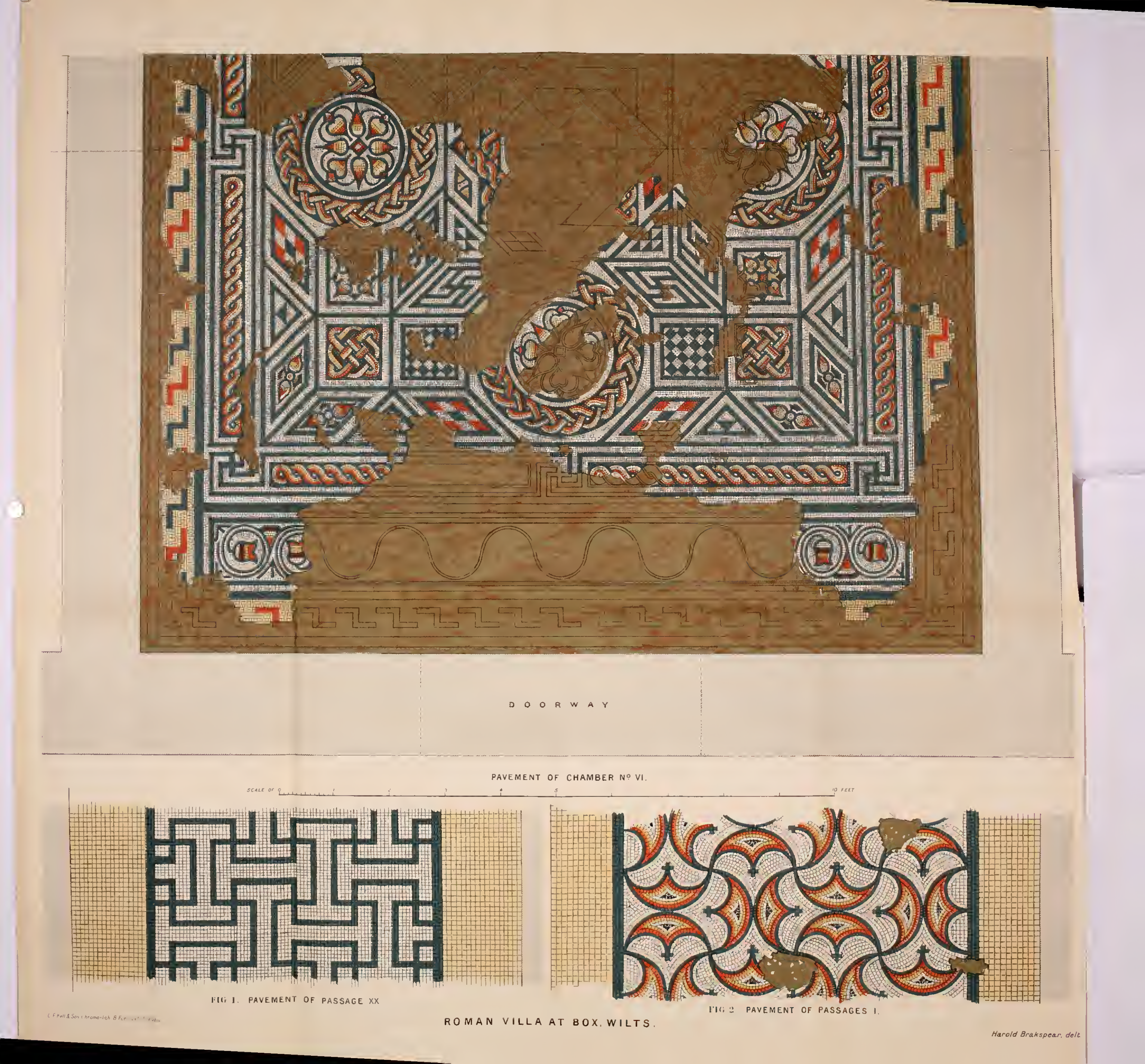
Mosaics from the Roman Villa

The Romans built the Fosse Way about 2 miles (3 km) to the west. Near the present-day Box church is the site of a Roman country house which was excavated during the 19th century, then in 1902–1903 by Harold Brakspear, and again in 1967–1968. Nothing is visible today, as the remains lie under later buildings, gardens and the churchyard. There was a major rebuilding in the late 3rd or early 4th century which changed it into the largest villa in the Bath area. The villa had one of the richest collections of mosaic floors of any building in Roman Britain, with remains found to date in 20 rooms, there being 42 rooms positively identified in the main villa and 15 more under investigation. Room 26 appears to be a major presence chamber in the manner of that at Trier. A villa such as this would have been the centre of a large estate and the focus of interest for at least six possible subsidiary villas or farmsteads at Ditteridge, Hazelbury and Shockerwick (near Bathford) and those further afield at Colerne, Atworth, and Bradford on Avon.

In 1086 the Domesday Book recorded 25 households at Hazelbury and six at Ditteridge. The earliest record of Box is from 1144 when Humphrey II de Bohun was a landowner. The village is shown on a 1630 map and by this time cloth weaving was an important home-based industry, supplying clothiers in nearby towns such as Bradford on Avon.

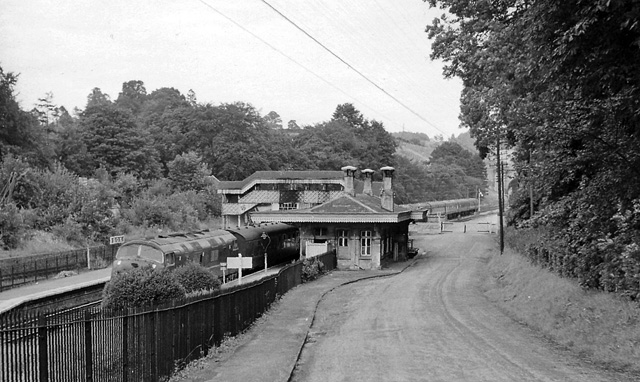
Box railway station in 1963

The Great Western Main Line railway (from London to Bristol and the South West) crosses the parish, and the Box Tunnel, 1.83 miles (2.95 km) long, was built under Box Hill. Construction took place between 1838 and 1841 with up to 4,000 men employed under the direction of Isambard Kingdom Brunel. At first Box station was built close to Ashley, where the A4 crosses the line; Box Mill Lane station was built a mile closer to Box village in 1930. Both stations closed in 1965 when local services were withdrawn.

A conservation area was designated at Box in 1975. This was extended in 1991, and at the same time new areas were designated at Ashley, Ditteridge and Middlehill.

=== Origin of the place-name ===
Early documented forms of the name include (Latin) Bocza and (English) Bocks, Boekes, and even Books. "The origin is very obscure" (Kidston). Local lore that the name is derived from the Box bush Buxus sempervirens is improbable. There is no supporting evidence at all, and Buxus is not native to the area. There is, however, a connection with beech: Box (Wilts), Box (Glos), Box Hill (Surrey), and places such as Boscombe (Wilts) and Le Bosc (France) all feature extensive beech woods growing on various limestones.

== Stone quarries ==
Stone found in the archaeological investigation of Box Roman Villa is of local origin and Roman masonry may be seen at the base of the wall between the church of St. Thomas a Becket and Box House.

Legend has it that St Aldhelm, Abbot of Malmesbury (c. 639–709) threw his glove on Box Hill, saying, "dig here and you will find treasure". Box stone was used for the construction of Malmesbury Abbey in the late 7th century.

Stone quarried in the parish was used in the late 12th and early 13th centuries for the abbeys at Stanley and Lacock, and in the 15th and 16th for Great Chalfield Manor and Longleat House.

Transport of stone was improved in 1727 when the Avon was made navigable between Bath and Bristol, and again in 1810 when the Kennet and Avon Canal provided a route from Bradford to London. The railway made transport much cheaper, and the excavation of the tunnel revealed vast beds of stone on both sides of the line. Underground quarries were carved out between Box and Corsham, with stone carried by narrow-gauge railways to yards at Box and Corsham stations.

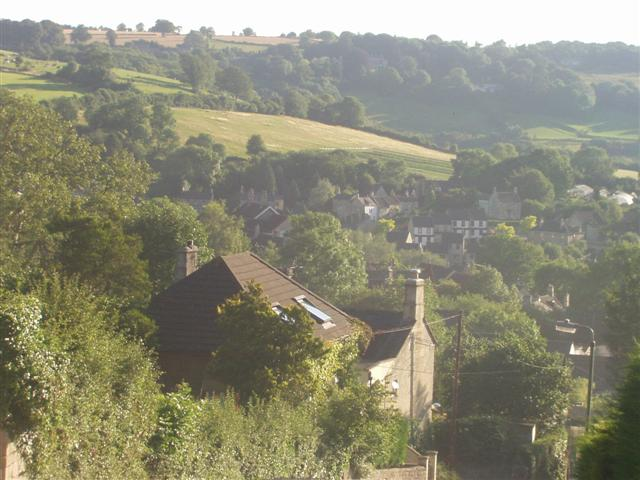
Hillsides above part of the village, 2007

The peak period for quarrying was between 1880 and 1909 when millions of tons of stone was cut. The quarries continued working until 1969. As of 2015, quarrying continues on a smaller scale at Corsham, where the Box Ground stratum has been re-encountered at a lower level in the Hartham quarry, from which the stone for the obelisk at the Box Rock Circus (below) was extracted.

=== Disused quarries ===
RAF Rudloe Manor, a headquarters site handling intelligence and directing operations, was established in the far east of the parish in 1940. Until 1945, critical functions were housed underground in a worked-out quarry, Brown's Quarry, to the north of Tunnel Quarry.

Underground in the same area, Spring Quarry was requisitioned in 1940 in order to create a shadow factory for aircraft engine manufacture, following the bombing of the Bristol Aeroplane Company at Filton. Construction took longer than expected and little production was achieved before the site closed in 1945. Artist Olga Lehmann was invited to paint murals in the workers' eating areas; in 2013 these were designated as Grade II* listed.

Between the late 1950s and 2004, Spring Quarry served as the Central Government War Headquarters, a self-sufficient government headquarters for use in the event of a nuclear conflict.

Box Mine became a biological Site of Special Scientific Interest in 1991.

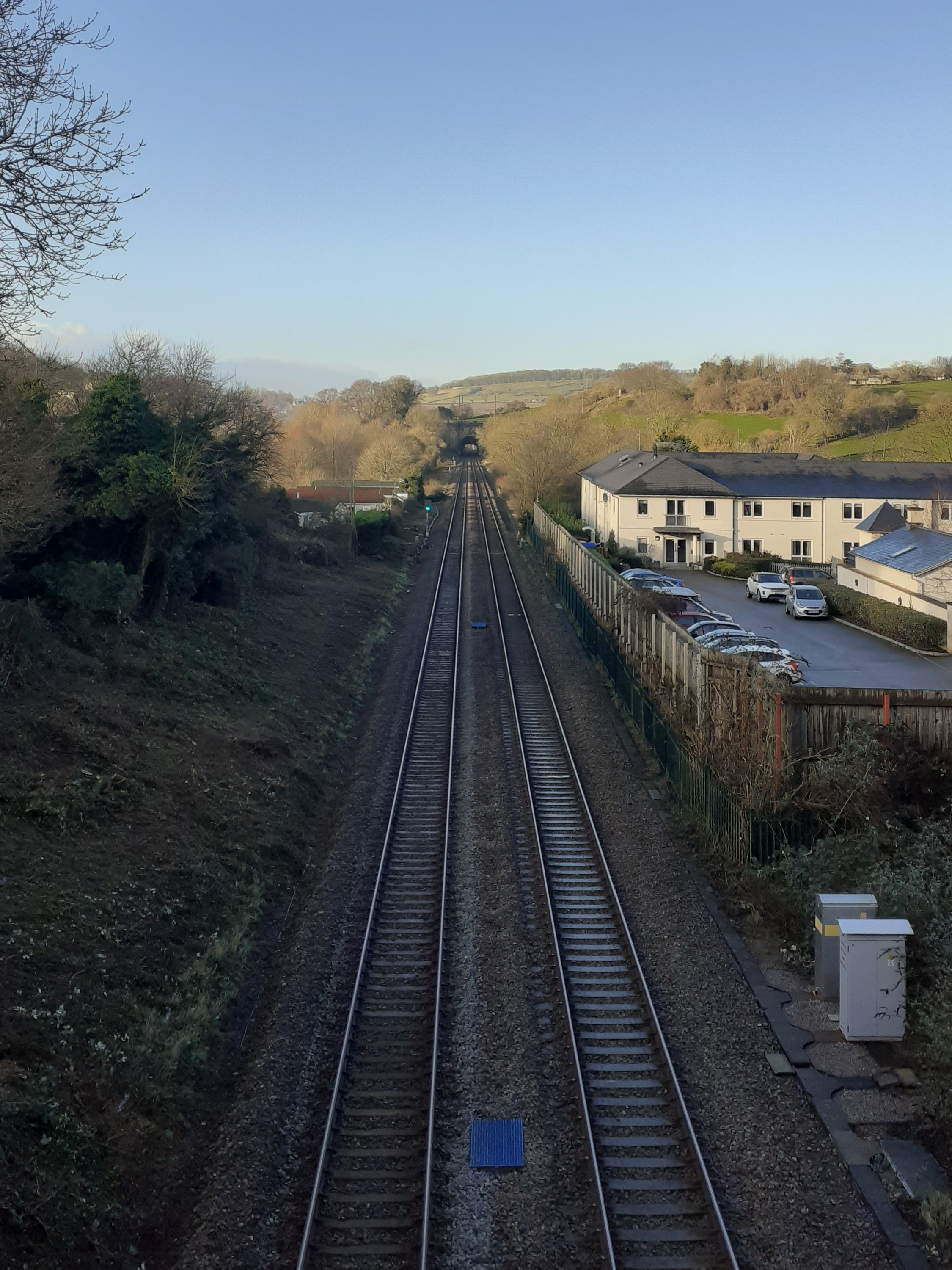
Railway tracks in Box stretching west towards Bath, 2020

== Governance ==
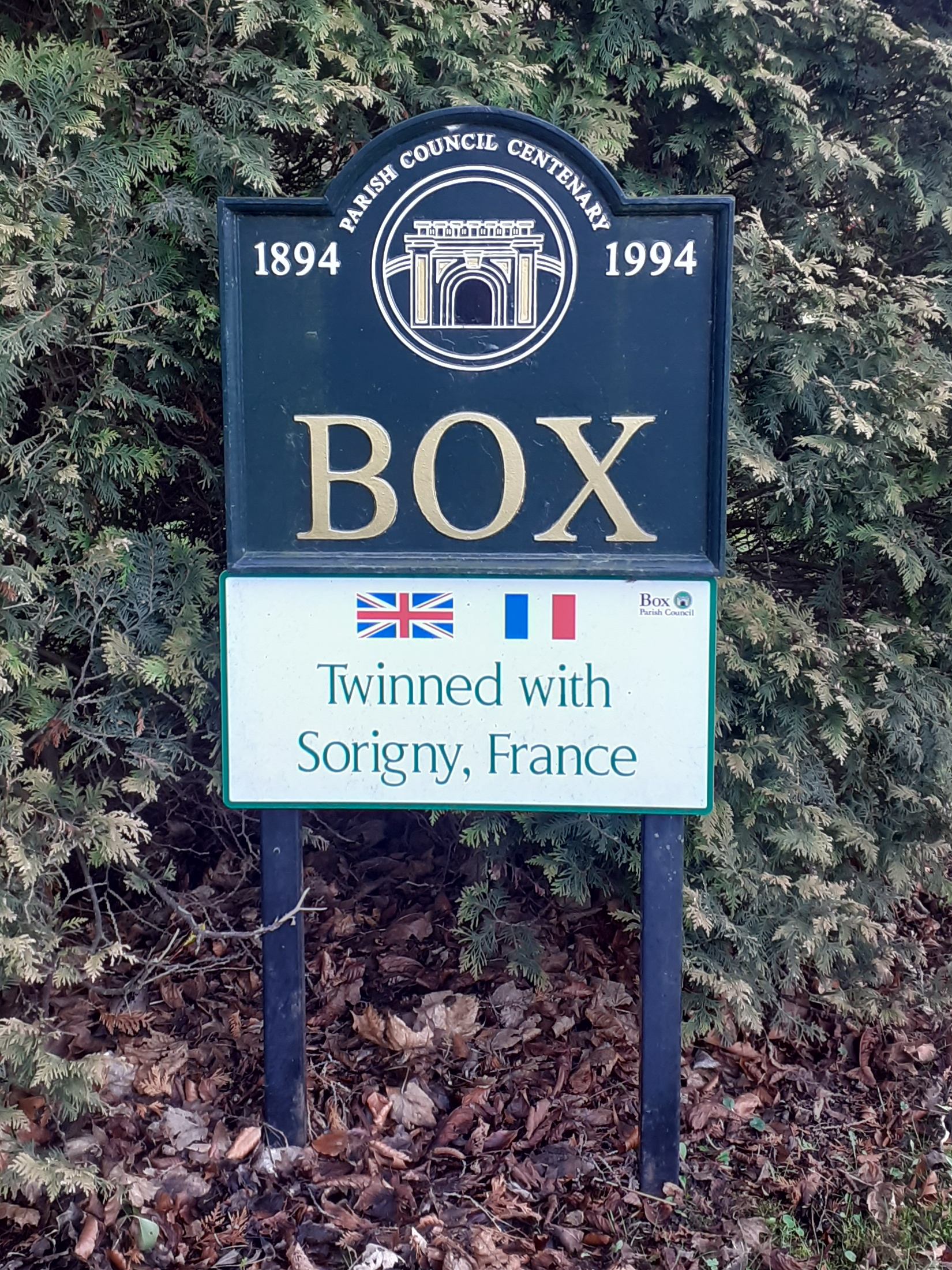
Village sign, 2020

The civil parish elects a parish council. It is in the area of Wiltshire Council unitary authority, which performs all significant local government functions. The electoral division of Box & Colerne covers Box and the neighbouring parish of Colerne, although Rudloe, in the east of Box parish, is part of Corsham Without division. Each division elects one member of Wiltshire Council.

Brian Mathew, a Liberal Democrat, has represented Box & Colerne on Wiltshire Council since May 2017. He was elected at the July 2024 general election to represent the Melksham and Devizes seat in Parliament; the Rudloe area is part of the Chippenham constituency.

== Religious sites ==
There were Saxon churches at Ditteridge and Hazelbury, and possibly at Box. The Church of St Thomas à Becket in Box has 12th-century origins. Alterations were made in the 14th century and a bell chamber and octagonal spire in the "decorated" style were added to the Norman tower in the 15th. Further restoration began in 1713, and in 1831 the church was extended with a south aisle; the interior was restored in 1896–7 by H.W. Brakspear. In 1960, the building was designated as Grade I listed.

The church of St Christopher, Ditteridge stands over a former Saxon church. It was rebuilt by the Normans and re-dedicated in 1087. It consists of a single nave and chancel and is Grade I listed.

The church of All Saints, Hazelbury fell into disuse before 1540. It stood on a knoll in an area north of Hazelbury Manor shown on the 17th century map as "Olde Church Feilde". Excavation by Kidston in the early 20th century indicated a single-cell church with a semi-circular apse at the east end. The stone sarcophagi now at St Thomas a Becket came from here. Kidston notes that carved masonry from the church was re-used in Hazelbury Manor.

Chapel Plaister has a small roadside church, rebuilt in 1340 and linked to a hostel for travellers; it is also Grade I listed.

The location of the Chapel of St David at Fogham mentioned in Kidston has not been discovered.

Box Methodist church was built in 1897, replacing a smaller Ebenezer Chapel built on the same site in 1834. An adjacent hall and Sunday school, opened in 1907, were sold for residential use in 2001. Methodist chapels were also established at Box Hill (1867) and Kingsdown (1869, rebuilt 1926). Both closed in 1967 and the congregations joined with Box church.

== Notable buildings ==
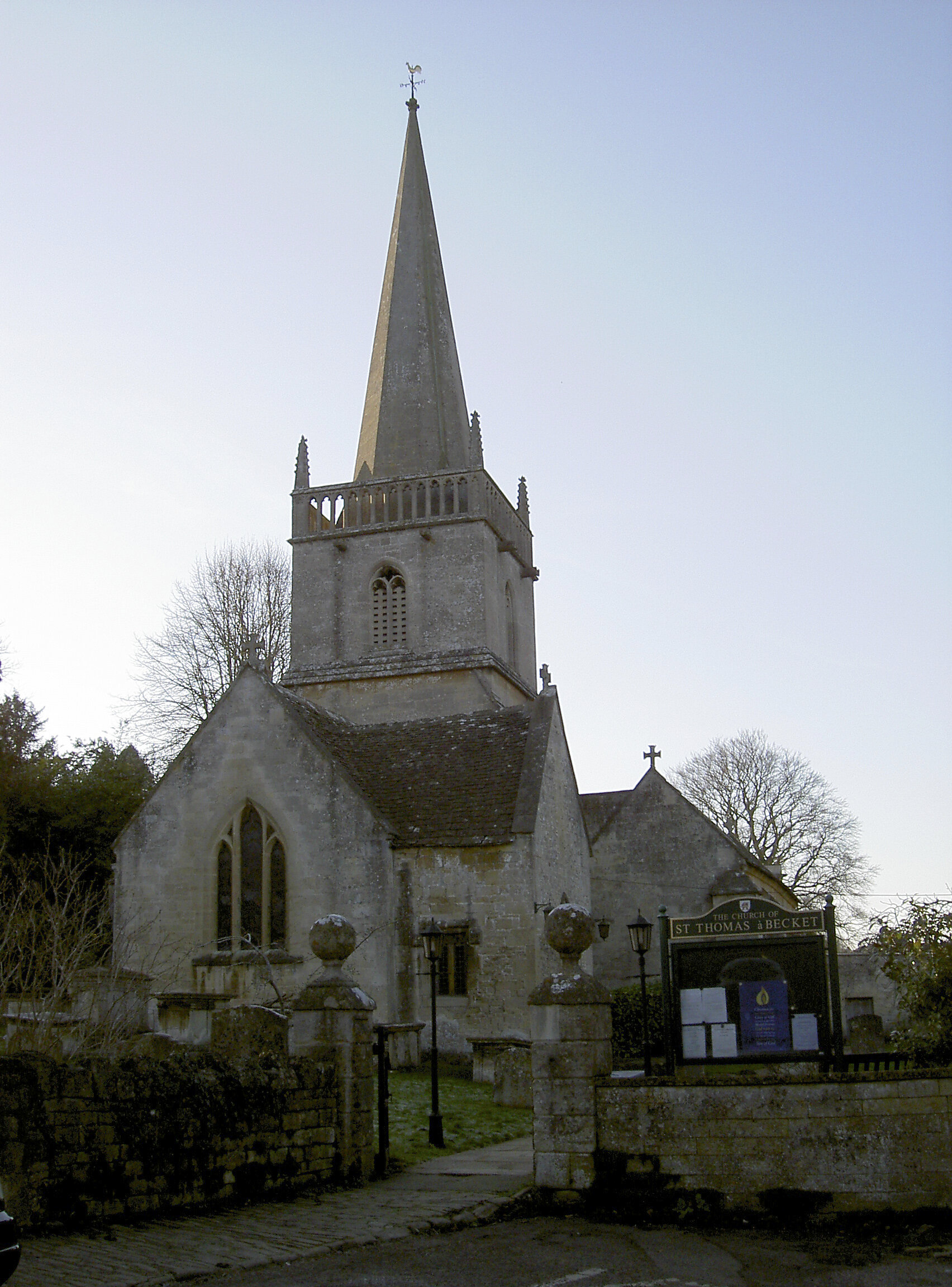
St Thomas a Becket Church, 2012

Box parish has 232 listed buildings, more than many Wiltshire parishes.

Three churches are listed at Grade I: St Thomas at Box, St Christopher at Ditteridge and Chapel Plaister. Also Grade I listed is Hazelbury Manor, about 0.6 miles (0.97 km) west of Box village: built around a 15th-century hall, enlarged in the next century and again enlarged and partly rebuilt in the 1920s.

The Grade II* listed houses are Hill House Farmhouse at Middlehill, 16th and 17th century; Coles Farmhouse at Alcombe in the north-west of the parish, mid-17th century; Drewett's Mill on the By Brook below Box Hill, mid-18th century; Cheyney Court, Ditteridge, early 17th century; and Rudloe Manor, to the east near Corsham, four bays, late 17th-century with an attached 15th-century element. Both portals of Middlehill Tunnel and the west portal of Box Tunnel are also Grade II* listed.

Fogleigh House on London Road is a Grade II listed mansion, built for quarry owner C J Pictor in 1881. Ashley Manor is Grade II listed and was owned by the Long family during the 16th and 17th century, followed by the Northey family from 18th to the 20th century; it was divided into three dwellings in the 1970s. Springfield House, Grade II, was built in 1729: formerly a workhouse and a school, the three-storey building has been converted into flats. Box Primary School is also Grade II listed. Box House is Grade II listed, built c.1810–20 for the Rev. I.W.W. Horlock, patron and vicar of Box for his own use, and used as the vicarage until 1874. The Rudloe Arms is a Grade II listed building with a four-storey Gothic tower in 14 acres, currently a hotel and restaurant run by Marco Pierre White.

A war memorial next to the Bath Road was unveiled on 23 October 1920, honouring the 43 Box parishioners who died in the First World War. A further 18 names, of those who had died in the Second World War, were added in July 1949.

== Facilities ==
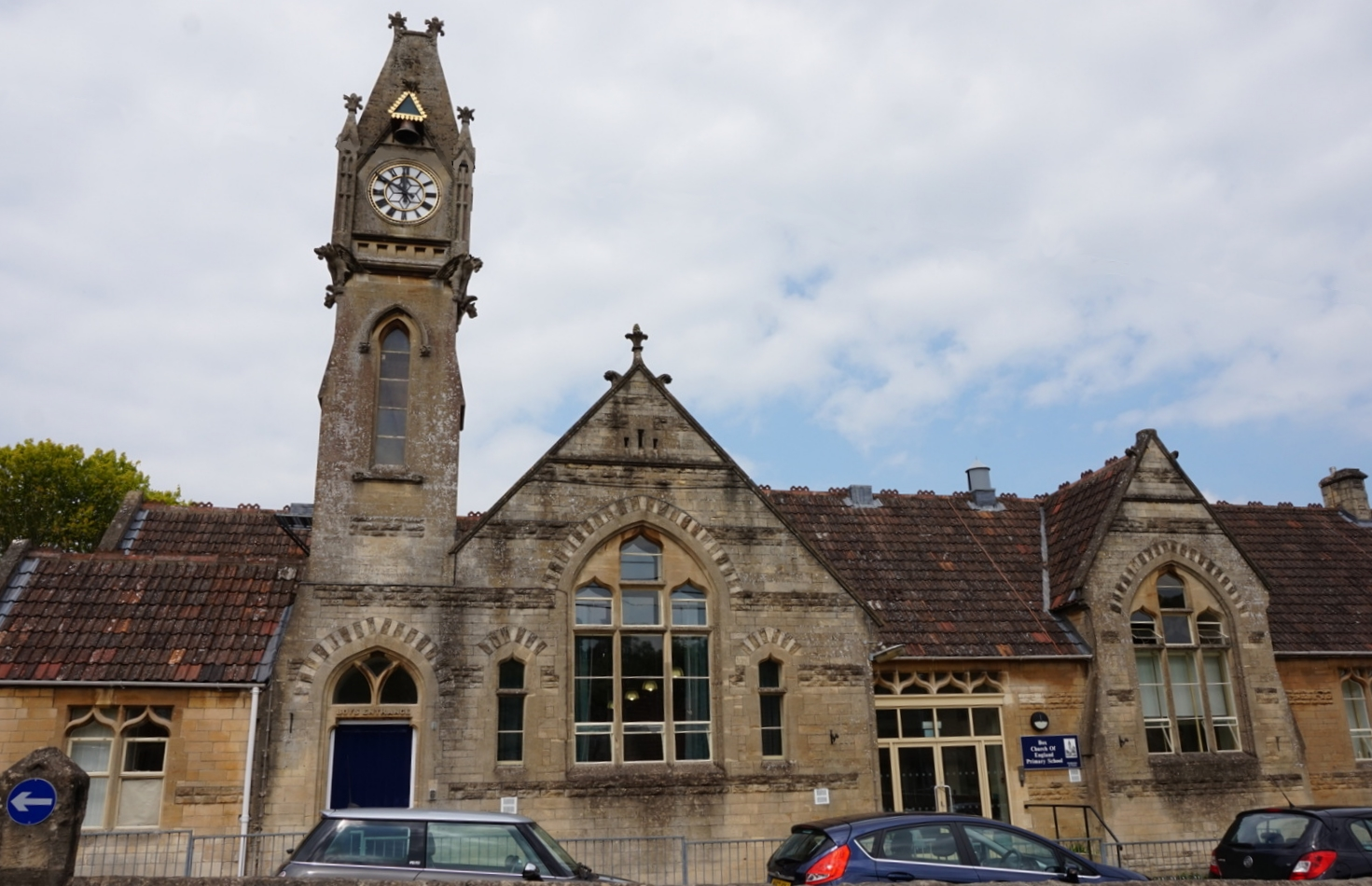
Box Primary School, 2016

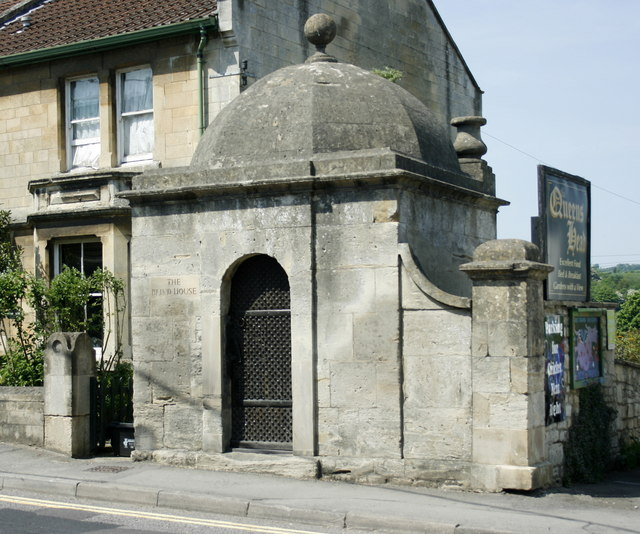
The Blind House, early 18th century lock-up, 2008

Box is home to Box Church of England Primary School. The earliest school was established near the church in 1708; the present building on the High Street, with attached house, is from 1875. Pevsner describes it as "Gothic, with a terrible, spindly tower".

The Selwyn Hall was built in 1969, and named for longtime vicar of Box, Rev. Tom Selwyn-Smith (1912–2003). It is used for community functions and houses the village library.

The village has sporting facilities including a lawn bowling green, two tennis courts, a cricket pitch, a football pitch, and even a small basketball area. These are all located in or around the Recreation Ground (a piece of land with an area of about 4.4 hectares (44,000 m^{2})).

A sports pavilion, the Box Parish Sports, Youth and Community Pavilion, was opened by Queen Camilla in May 2009.

=== Box Rock Circus ===
Also on the recreation ground is the unique 'Box Rock Circus', a 22 ft (6.7 m) diameter circle which is an earth-science educational facility. It was constructed during 2012 by local craftsmen with stone donated by numerous companies and funded principally by landfill tax funds. The facility was formally opened on 14 May 2013 by the Professor of Geosciences Communication, and television personality, Iain Stewart.

== Notable residents ==
- Rev. Wilbert V. Awdry (1911–1997), the creator of Thomas the Tank Engine, lived as a boy at Lorne House on London Road, Box
- Thomas Bowdler (1754–1825), doctor and publisher linked to the verb bowdlerize, born in Box
- Arthur Bradfield (1892–1978), cricketer
- Ernest Butler (1919–2002), professional footballer for Portsmouth
- Peter Gabriel (born 1950), rock musician, singer, songwriter, and proprietor of Real World Studios and Real World Records
- Maisie Gay (1878–1945), actress on stage and later in films, also a singer and comedian, managed the Northey Arms with her husband after her retirement in the early 1930s
- Jack MacBryan (1892–1983), cricketer
- William Pinker (1847–1932), born in Box to a family of stonemasons and quarrymen, rose to foreman of masons and head of the Department of Antiquities at the British Museum, where he worked for almost 60 years
