= Ashley, Wiltshire =

Village in Wiltshire, England

Coordinates: 51.415°N 2.267°W

Ashley
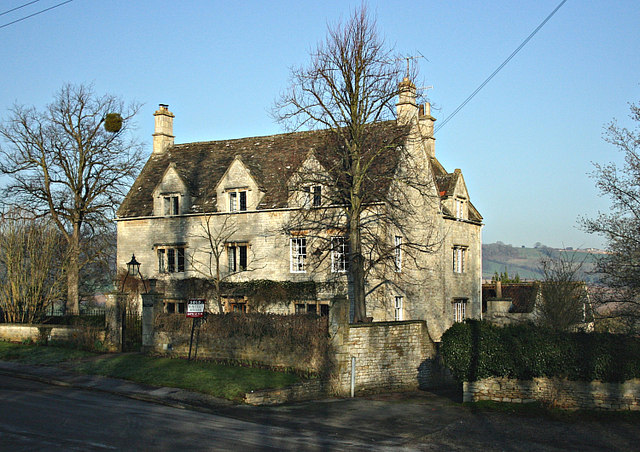
- Ashley Farm House

- Location within Wiltshire
- OS grid reference: ST815685
- Civil parish: Box
- Unitary authority: Wiltshire
- Ceremonial county: Wiltshire
- Region: South West
- Country: England
- Sovereign state: United Kingdom
- Post town: CORSHAM
- Postcode district: SN13 8
- Police: Wiltshire
- Fire: Dorset and Wiltshire
- Ambulance: South Western
- UK Parliament: Melksham and Devizes

Ashley is a small village in the civil parish of Box in Wiltshire, England. Its nearest town is Corsham, which lies approximately 3.5 miles (5.6 km) east from the village.

The village is on the A4 which links Bath with Corsham and Chippenham. Ashley Manor is from the 17th century. Box railway station was close to Ashley, where the A4 crosses the Great Western line. There is a pub, the Northey Arms.

It should not be confused with Ashley, Gloucestershire near Tetbury, which was transferred from Wiltshire to Gloucestershire in 1930.
