= Arthur Bradfield =

English cricketer

Personal information
- Full name: Arthur Bradfield
- Born: 5 January 1892; Box, Wiltshire, England
- Died: 25 December 1978 (aged 86); Mochdre, Denbighshire, Wales
- Batting: Right-handed
- Role: Wicket-keeper

Domestic team information
- Years: Team
- 1922: Essex

Career statistics
| Competition | First-class |
|---|---|
| Matches | 5 |
| Runs scored | 7 |
| Batting average | 1.75 |
| 100s/50s | –/– |
| Top score | 4* |
| Balls bowled | – |
| Wickets | – |
| Bowling average | – |
| 5 wickets in innings | – |
| 10 wickets in match | – |
| Best bowling | – |
| Catches/stumpings | 2/3 |
- Source: Cricinfo, 25 October 2011

Arthur Bradfield (5 January 1892 – 25 December 1978) was an English cricketer. Bradfield was a right-handed batsman who fielded as a wicket-keeper. He was born at Box, Wiltshire.

Bradfield made his first-class debut for Essex against the Combined Services in 1922. He made four further first-class appearances for Essex in 1922, the last of which came against Northamptonshire. In his five matches he scored just 7 runs at an average of 1.75, with a high score of 4 not out, while behind the stumps he took 2 catches and made 3 stumpings.

He died on 25 December 1978 at Mochdre, Denbighshire, Wales.
