= Frank's Wood =

- Location within Wiltshire
- Interactive map of Frank's Wood

Geography
- Location: Wiltshire, England
- OS grid: ST822713
- Coordinates: 51.440°N 2.256°W
- Area: 1.92 hectares (4.74 acres)

Administration
- Authority: Woodland Trust

Frank's Wood is a woodland in Wiltshire, England, on the north-east edge of Colerne village. It covers an area of 1.96 hectares (4.84 acres). It is owned and managed by the Woodland Trust.

Formerly arable land, the wood was created in 2000 under the Woodland Trust's "Woods on Your Doorstep" scheme, and named in honour of Frank Entwistle of Colerne, one of the instigators of the project. It is planted with mixed native broadleaf trees and some woody shrubs.
