= Hazelbury Manor =

Grade I listed manor house in Wiltshire, England

Coordinates: 51.4140°N 2.2382°W

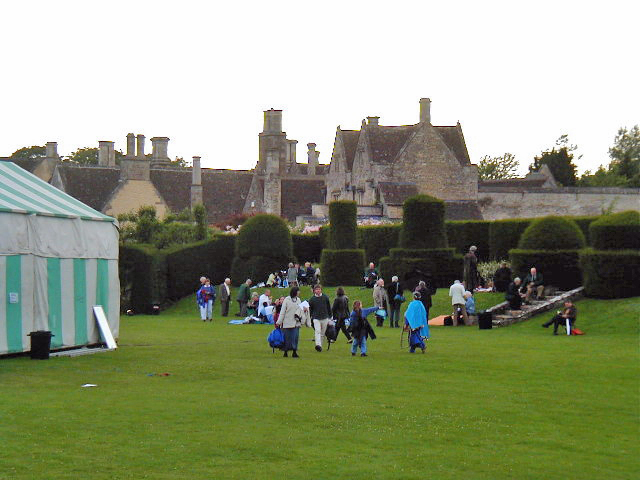
Hazelbury Manor: part of gardens, with house behind

Hazelbury Manor is a Grade I listed manor house in the hamlet of Hazelbury, in the parish of Box, Wiltshire, England. Parts of the house date from the 15th century.

== House ==
The house has two storeys, with attics, and is built around four sides of a courtyard. The oldest part is the great hall, c. 1500, which may incorporate an earlier hall; the four sides were completed in stages during the 16th century. In 1920–25 the west and north sides were rebuilt, and additions made which include a two-storey south porch and a service range which links the house to a formerly detached 17th-century dower house.

The manor was purchased by the Speke family in the early 17th century and passed to the Northey family in the early 18th century. In the early 20th century, George Jardine Kidston bought it and restored it with the help of the architect Harold Brakspear. They enlarged the house considerably, completing the rear courtyard in an architecturally sensitive fashion with reference to excavated foundations. Kidston wrote a book on its history, published in 1936. Julian Orbach calls the house "another early C20 re-creation of the manorial dream", like those nearby at Great Chalfield and Westwood.

The house was recorded as Grade I listed in 1960. From 1943 to 1971 the buildings were used by a girls' school, then in 1973 returned to private ownership. The house is approached down a straight tree-lined drive, some 600m in length, and is not open to the public.

A separate building to the south-east, known as the Granary, was built as a granary and cart-shed in the 17th century. It was converted into a garage, cottages and workshop by Brakspear in 1922–25, and is now a private house. The coach house and stable block are also from the 17th century.

== Gardens ==
The house is set in 186 acres (0.75 km^{2}) of land, 8 acres of which are landscaped gardens. The gardens are Edwardian-style and were laid out by George Kidston in the 1920s. They contain topiary and colourful herbaceous borders. Later (1980s) additions include a circle of menhirs and a laburnum walk. In 1990, the gardens were recorded as Grade II on the Register of Historic Parks and Gardens.

Between 1993 and 2010, the gardens were an annual summer venue for plays by Shakespeare Live, a regional theatre company which raises money for charity.

== Sale ==
In May 2023, the manor was offered for sale with a guide price of £7,500,000.
