= Kingsdown, Box =

Hamlet in Wiltshire, England

Coordinates: 51.402°N 2.274°W

Kingsdown
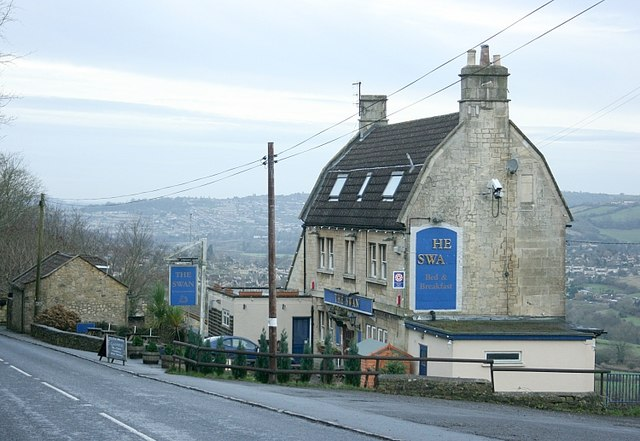
- The Swan, Kingsdown (2008)

- Location within Wiltshire
- OS grid reference: ST810670
- Civil parish: Box
- Unitary authority: Wiltshire
- Ceremonial county: Wiltshire
- Region: South West
- Country: England
- Sovereign state: United Kingdom
- Post town: CORSHAM
- Postcode district: SN13
- Dialling code: 01225
- Police: Wiltshire
- Fire: Dorset and Wiltshire
- Ambulance: South Western
- UK Parliament: Melksham and Devizes

Kingsdown is a hamlet in the civil parish of Box, Wiltshire, England. It is about 1.5 miles (2.4 km) south-west of Box village and 1.2 miles (1.9 km) east of Bathford, across the county border in Somerset.

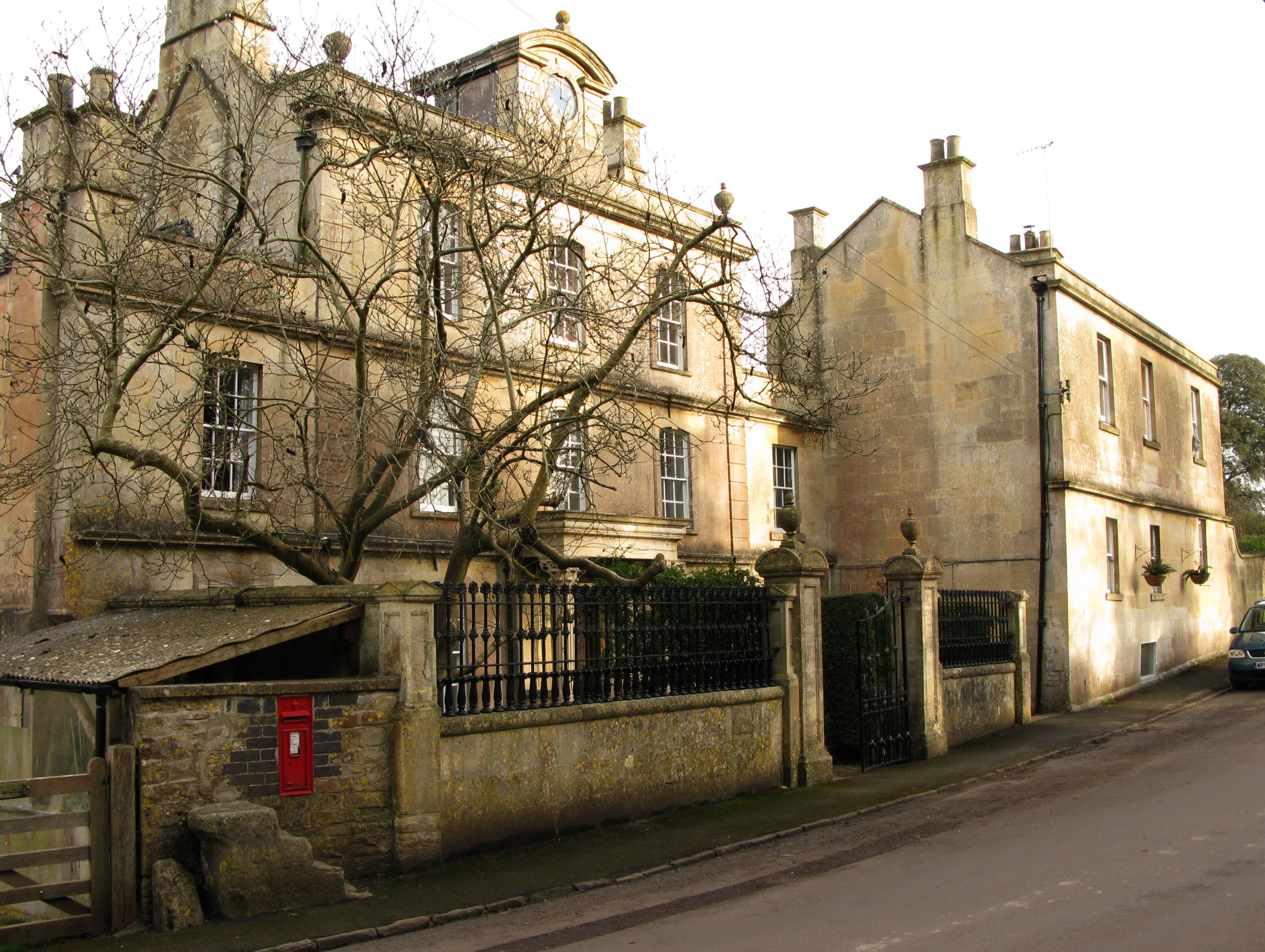
Kingsdown House

At the top of Doctor's Hill, Kingsdown House is a three-storey ashlar house from the early 18th century; its formal front with parapet and corner urns was embellished in the 19th century with a Corinthian porch and a roof-height clock. There was a private asylum here from the 17th century to the mid-20th, latterly called Kingsdown Nursing Home. The house and its adjacent 19th-century buildings are now in residential use.

A Methodist chapel was built in 1869 and rebuilt in 1926. By 2003 it was a private house.

There is a pub, the Swan Inn. Kingsdown Golf Course is on higher ground to the east of the hamlet.
