= Ditteridge =

Village in Wiltshire, England

Coordinates: 51.4234°N 2.2636°W

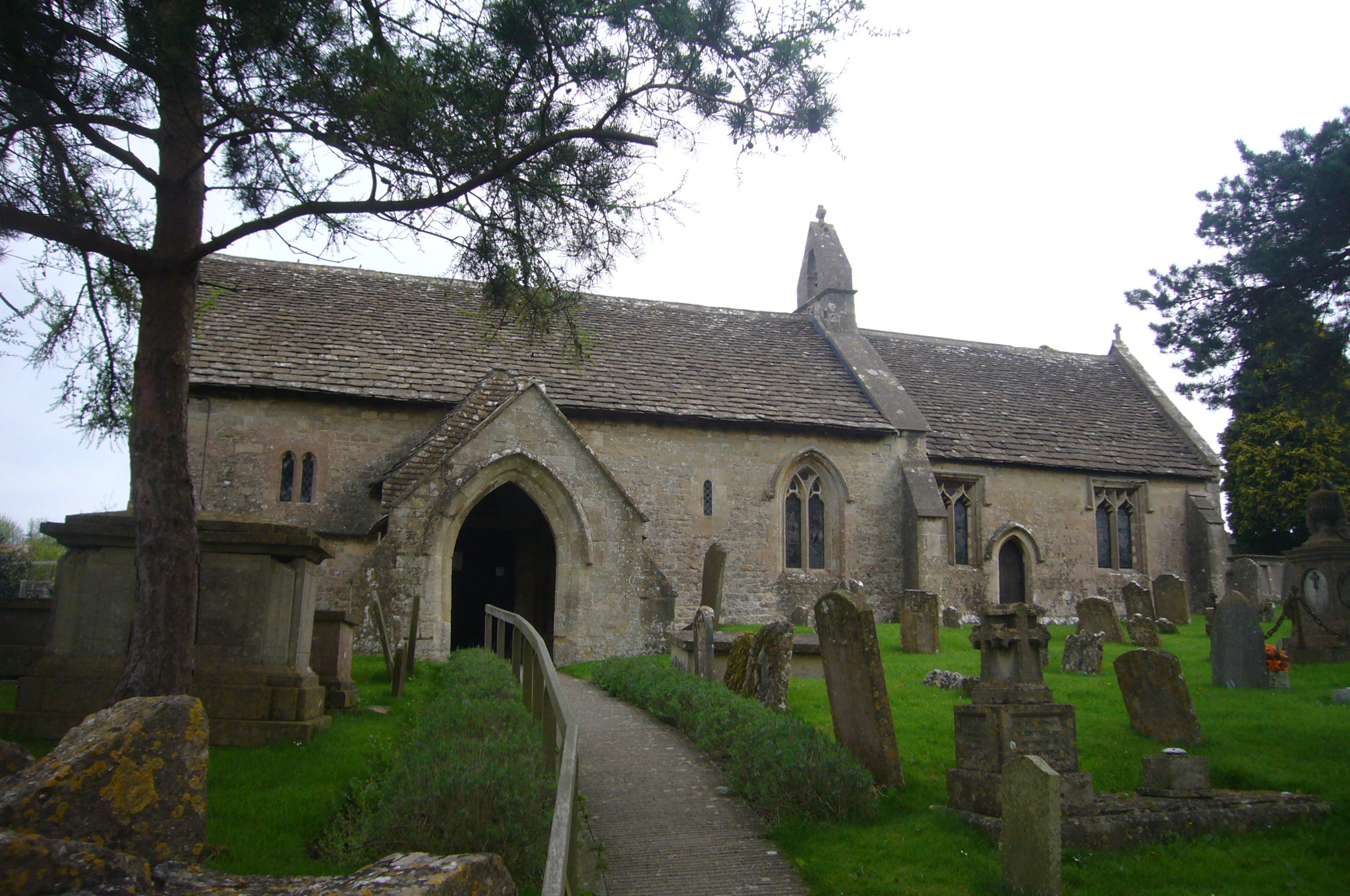
- The Church of Saint Christopher, Ditteridge

- Location within Wiltshire
- OS grid reference: ST818694
- Civil parish: Box
- Unitary authority: Wiltshire
- Ceremonial county: Wiltshire
- Region: South West
- Country: England
- Sovereign state: United Kingdom
- Post town: Corsham
- Postcode district: SN13
- Dialling code: 01225
- Police: Wiltshire
- Fire: Dorset and Wiltshire
- Ambulance: South Western
- UK Parliament: Melksham and Devizes

Ditteridge is a village in the civil parish of Box, Wiltshire, England. It is about 0.8 miles (1.3 km) northwest of Box village and 3.5 miles (6 km) west of the town of Corsham. Formerly a larger settlement, it has an early Norman church and had its own civil parish for a time in the 19th century.

== History ==
The Fosse Way Roman road passes 1.5 miles (2.4 km) west of Ditteridge. Domesday Book in 1086 recorded a small settlement at Digeric with six households and a half share in a mill.

Consisting today of a farm and a handful of houses, the ancient parish of Ditteridge (which included the hamlet of Alcombe) had a larger population, peaking at 119 at the 1851 census. In 1881 the parish had a population of 101. As well as land around the hamlet (mostly to its north), the parish had three detached parts, all within the current Box parish. The civil parish, created in 1837, was combined with Box on 25 March 1884.

Cheney Court (or Cheyney Court) is a large 17th-century manor house of two and a half storeys. In the late 19th century the author P. G. Wodehouse spent some of his childhood there while his parents lived in Hong Kong, the house being owned by his grandmother and four of his aunts. The Grade II* listed building was used by a language school – part of the Marcus Evans Group – as recently as 2020 but was absent from the company's website in January 2022.

At Middlehill, half a mile to the south, a spa was built in 1783 but failed after a few years. Spa House is from that period, and nearby Middlehill House is an 1830s recasing of a mid-18th-century building.

From circa 1849 a school was associated with the church; after it closed in the 1880s, children attended the school at Box.

== Location ==
Ditteridge is about 1.4 miles (2.3 km) east of the Three Shire Stones, which mark the point where the counties of Gloucestershire, Somerset, and Wiltshire meet.

== Parish church ==
The parish church of St Christopher is described by Orbach as "small and characterful". There is evidence of a Saxon church on the site. The rubble stone nave of the present church dates from c. 1100, as evidenced by the south doorway which has carving of unusually high quality. The imposts have a winged dragon and a horse, and masked men's heads; the arch has lyre-shaped leaf motifs and the blank tympanum has a shallow niche, perhaps for a statue. East of the porch is a small Norman arch-headed light.

The chancel was added in the 13th century and has a piscina from the same period. The south porch was built in the 14th century, and changes were made to the windows in the 15th. Restoration in 1859–60 by E. W. Godwin included new roofs, ashlar lining to the north and east walls of the chancel, and an outer arched surround to the doorway. Some stained glass was designed by Godwin and the massive stone pulpit with incised decoration, described by Historic England as "high Victorian", is also his. A north vestry was added in the 20th century.

The stone bowl of the font is Norman although its shaft and base are probably later medieval. The small bellcote above the junction of nave and chancel has a single bell dated c.1599. There are seven Grade II listed monuments in the churchyard.

At some point the benefice was united with Box and Hazelbury, although the parishes remain distinct. Today the parish is part of the Lidbrook Group, which also covers St John's church at Colerne.

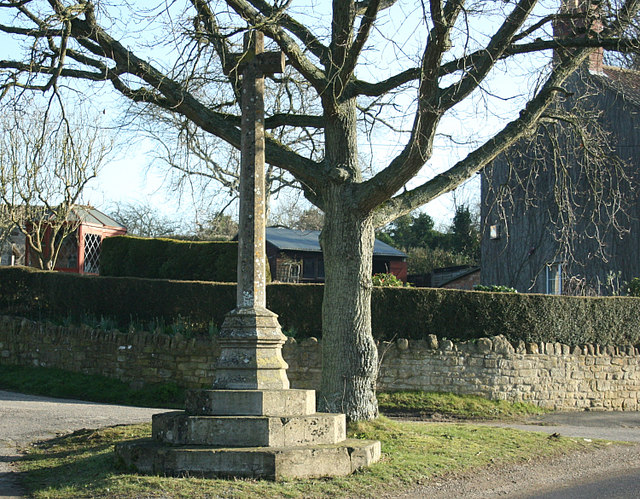
War memorial, Ditteridge
