= Box Hill, Wiltshire =

Village in Wiltshire, England

Coordinates: 51.424°N 2.238°W

Box Hill
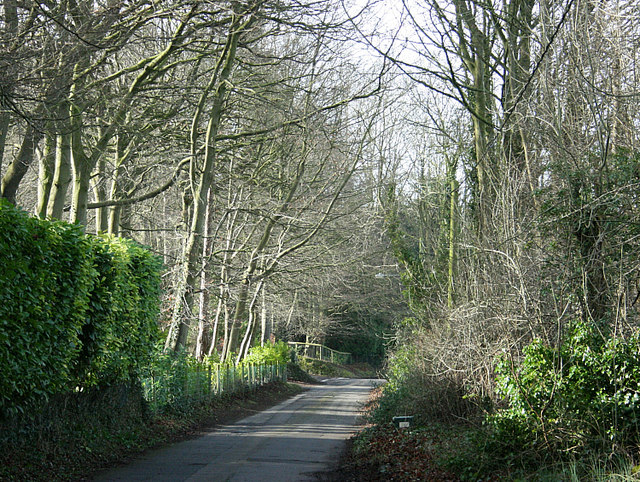
- Beech Road, Box Hill

- Location within Wiltshire
- OS grid reference: ST835695
- Civil parish: Box
- Unitary authority: Wiltshire
- Ceremonial county: Wiltshire
- Region: South West
- Country: England
- Sovereign state: United Kingdom
- Post town: Corsham
- Postcode district: SN13
- Dialling code: 01225
- Police: Wiltshire
- Fire: Dorset and Wiltshire
- Ambulance: South Western
- UK Parliament: Melksham and Devizes

Box Hill is a small village in Wiltshire, England, most notable for its position above Brunel's famous Box Tunnel. It is located on the A4 road just northeast of Box village, approximately 2 miles (3 km) west of the centre of the town of Corsham, and approximately 6 miles (10 km) northeast of the World Heritage city of Bath.

The village has a pub, the Quarryman's Arms.
