= William De Ow =

Anglo-Norman nobleman

William De Ow was a Norman landholder. At the time of the Domesday Book he held properties in Dorset, Gloucestershire, and Somerset, and he was the owner of what is now known as Stonehouse Manor, a grade II listed manor in the Cotswolds town of Stonehouse, Gloucestershire.

Thomas Cox's Magna Britannia, Antiqua et Nova (ca. 1738) states that, during the reign of William the Conqueror, De Ow was accused of treason and demanded to prove himself innocent in trial by combat. He lost and was subsequently blinded and dismembered.
