= John Poulter =

Serial robber

- Born: Unknown; Newmarket, England
- Died: 25 February 1754; Exeter, England
- Occupations: Highwayman, writer
- Known for: Criminal activities and memoir The Discoveries of John Poulter

John Poulter (died 25 February 1754) was a highwayman who committed numerous robberies across England in a five-year period. This crime spree ended in Exeter in 1753, when he was arrested for the robbery of a man on the outskirts of Bath, for which he was hanged the following year.

Prior to his execution, Poulter wrote a detailed account of his crimes, naming numerous accomplices who were subsequently arrested. The book also offered advice to the public on the methods used by thieves. It was hugely popular, with seventeen editions printed.

== Early life ==
Poulter grew up in Newmarket, and attended day school from the ages of seven to thirteen. He was then employed working in service as an assistant groom for several households over the next ten years, and was considered honest and hard-working. He then joined a trading ship out of Bristol, making several voyages to the West Indies and North America. When the ship was decommissioned following the Treaty of Aix-la-Chapelle in 1748, he returned to England.
