= Hazelbury, Wiltshire =

Hazelbury
- Extinct settlement
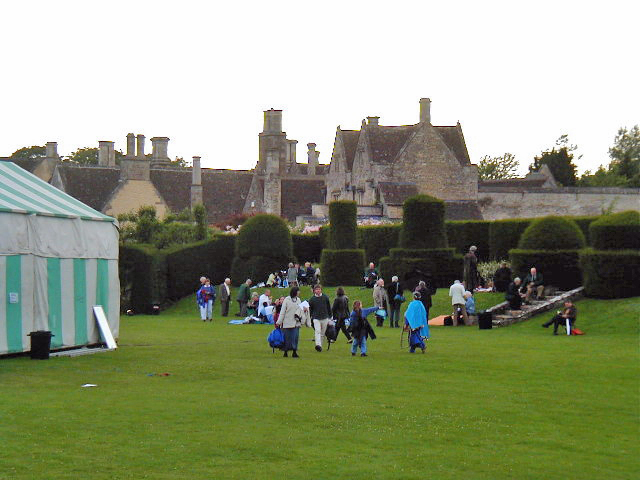
- Hazelbury Manor: part of gardens, with house behind

- Hazelbury within Wiltshire
- Coordinates: 51°24′50″N 2°14′16″W
- Country: England
- County: Wiltshire
- Parish: Box
- Postal code: SN13
- Area code: 01225

Hazelbury is a former village in the civil parish of Box, Wiltshire, England. It was about 0.5 miles (0.8 km) southeast of the present-day village of Box and 3 miles (5 km) south-west of the town of Corsham.

There was a Roman villa. Hazelbury was recorded in the Domesday Book of 1086 as Haseberie, with 25 households and a church. The church fell into disuse before 1540. In the 1872 Imperial Gazetteer of England and Wales, Hazelbury is described as "once was a parish; and it still ranks as a rectory in the diocese of Gloucester and Bristol". The name is spelled Hasilbury in a 1900 book.

Chapel Plaister, an ancient roadside church and hospice for pilgrims which still stands about half a mile to the south-east, was dependent on Hazelbury church.

The extinction of the village probably followed the Black Death pandemic. Today only Hazelbury Manor survives: a 15th-century Grade I listed building in grounds of 186 acres (75 hectares).
