= Harold Brakspear =

British architect

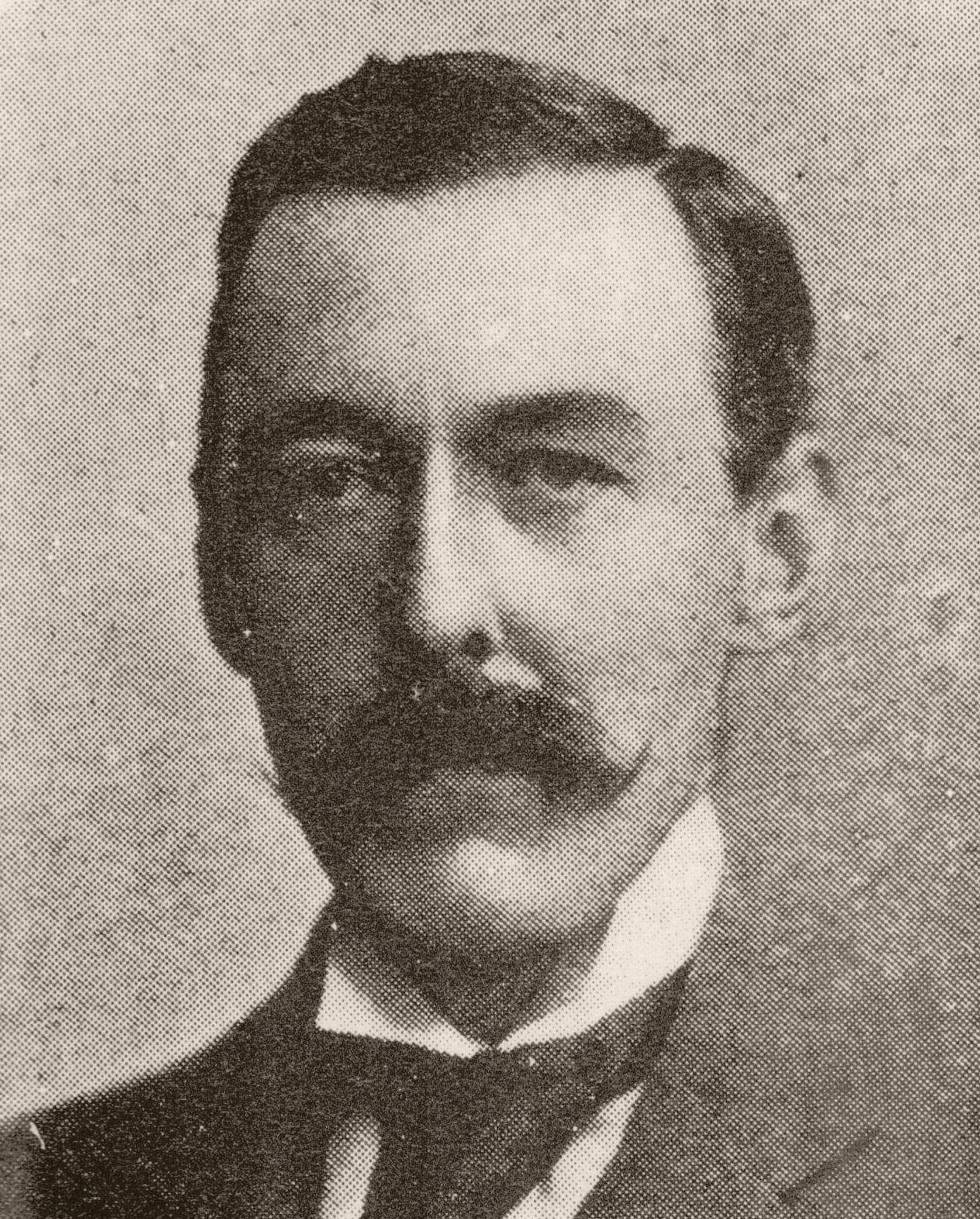
Harold Brakspear

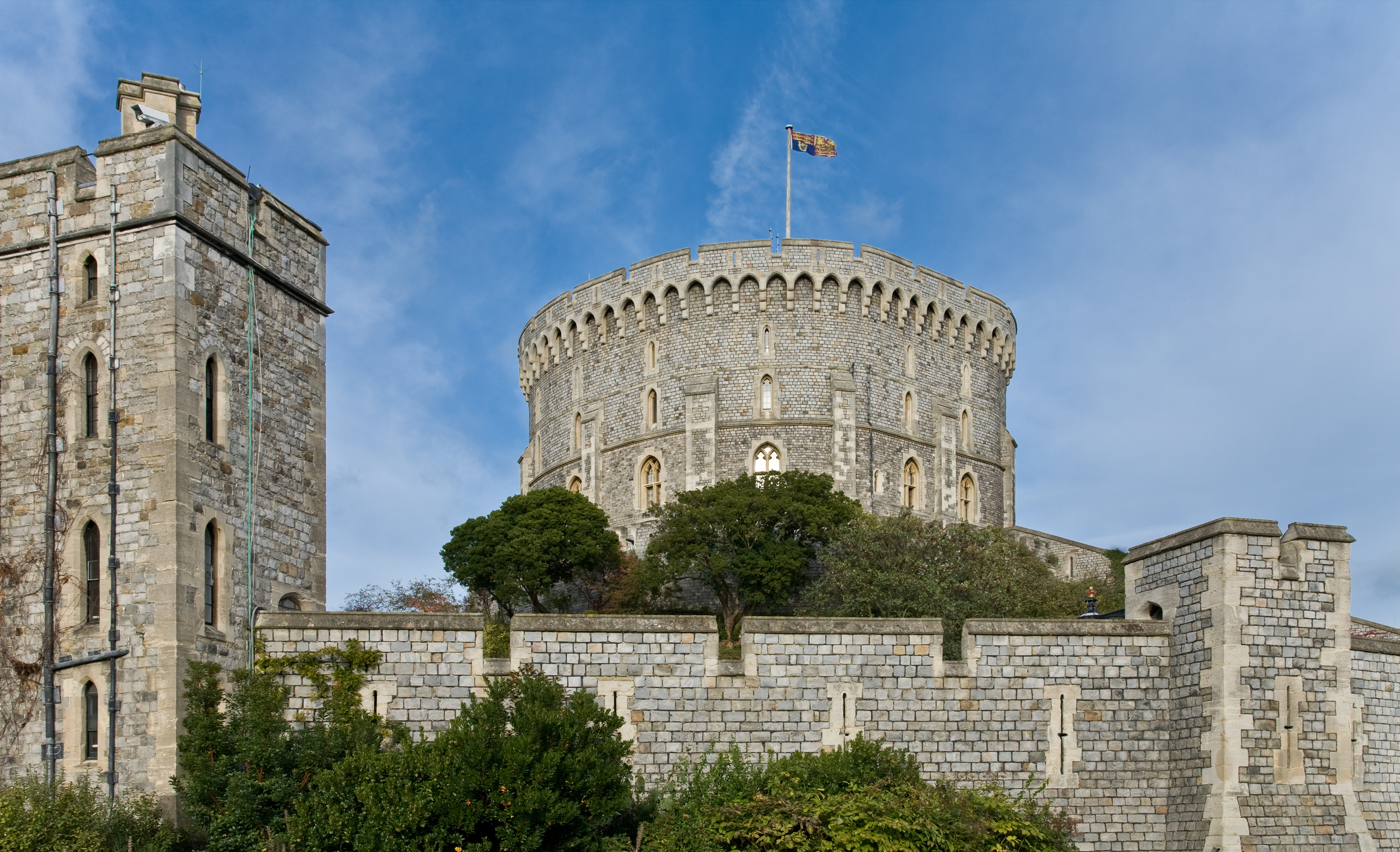
Brakspear was consulting architect to the Dean and Canons of Windsor; pictured is Windsor Castle's Round Tower

Sir Harold Brakspear KCVO (10 March 1870 – 20 November 1934) was an English restoration architect and archaeologist.

He restored a number of ancient and notable buildings, including Bath Abbey, Windsor Castle, Malmesbury Abbey, Brownston House in Devizes and St Cyriac's Church in Lacock. He lived in Corsham, Wiltshire, close to his projects at Lacock Abbey, Hazelbury Manor and Great Chalfield Manor.

Brakspear was appointed Knight Commander of the Royal Victorian Order in the 1931 New Year Honours. He was elected president of the Wiltshire Archaeological and Natural History Society in 1932 and re-elected the next year, his term ending in July 1934.

In 1908 he married Lilian Somers of Halesowen, Worcestershire; they had a son and a daughter, Oswald and Mary. Oswald was an architect who designed churches and parsonage houses.
