= List of Grade I listed buildings in Wiltshire =

This is a list of Grade I listed buildings in Wiltshire, England, in the United Kingdom.

These buildings are protected for their historic significance. There is a parallel system for ancient monuments, known as 'scheduling', which means that there is not a consistent approach to sites like castles, abbeys and henges, which may be listed, scheduled or both. In England, the listing is administered by Historic England, an agency of the government's Department for Digital, Culture, Media and Sport.

Buildings of outstanding architectural or historic interest are listed at Grade I, and of the approximately 372,905 listed buildings in England, over 9,000 (2.5%) are Grade I. Estimates to the numbers of buildings do, however, vary given that separate listings apply to structurally separate buildings: therefore a street of houses can be listed as one building, but a church wall can be listed separately from the church. Some buildings are listed for their group value.

This list covers the nearly 300 Grade I listed buildings in the ceremonial county of Wiltshire, grouped by former district. There is a characteristically large contribution from Church of England (Anglican) parish churches, and several great English country houses are included with some of their landscaping features. Several barns are included, and Crofton Pumping Station is associated with water supply.

== Salisbury ==
There are 38 Grade I listed buildings in the city of Salisbury, many of them associated with Salisbury Cathedral.

== Borough of Swindon ==
Name	Location	Type	Completed (Note: The date given is the date used by Historic England as significant for the initial building or that of an important part in the structure's description.)	Date designated	Grid ref. (Note: The grid reference is based on the British national grid reference system, sometimes known as OSGB36, used by the Ordnance Survey.) Geo-coordinates	Entry number (Note: The "List Entry Number" is a unique number assigned to each listed building and scheduled monument by Historic England.)	Image
Church of St Swithin	Hinton Parva, Bishopstone	Church	Norman	26 January 1955	SU2319883292; 51°32′53″N 1°40′01″W	1023270	Church of St Swithin More images
Parish Church of St Mary	Bishopstone	Church	15th century	26 January 1955	SU2436583729; 51°33′07″N 1°39′00″W	1183976	Parish Church of St Mary More images
Parish Church of St Mary	Castle Eaton	Church	13th century	26 January 1955	SU1463895966; 51°39′44″N 1°47′23″W	1023297	Parish Church of St Mary More images
Church of the Holy Cross	Chiseldon	Church	Anglo-Saxon	26 January 1955	SU1871379971; 51°31′06″N 1°43′54″W	1023312	Church of the Holy Cross More images
Church of St Michael	Highworth	Church	C15	26 January 1955	SU2011692501; 51°37′51″N 1°42′39″W	1299973	Church of St Michael More images
Church of St John	Inglesham	Church	Saxon	26 January 1955	SU2053298431; 51°41′03″N 1°42′16″W	1023391	Church of St John More images
Church of All Saints	Liddington	Church	13th century	26 January 1955	SU2061981256; 51°31′47″N 1°42′15″W	1299741	Church of All Saints More images
Church of St Mary Magdalen	South Marston	Church	Medieval	26 January 1955	SU1953487991; 51°35′26″N 1°43′10″W	1023403	Church of St Mary Magdalen More images
Church of St Leonard	Stanton Fitzwarren	Church	Norman	26 January 1955	SU1788090119; 51°36′35″N 1°44′35″W	1023408	Church of St Leonard More images
Church of St Margaret	Stratton St Margaret	Church	13th century	26 January 1955	SU1795687095; 51°34′57″N 1°44′32″W	1185393	Church of St Margaret More images
Church of St Andrew	Wanborough	Church	14th century	26 January 1955	SU2077282568; 51°32′30″N 1°42′07″W	1185526	Church of St Andrew More images
Parish Church of St John and St Helen	Wroughton	Church	14th century	26 January 1955	SU1375980257; 51°31′16″N 1°48′11″W	1355917	Parish Church of St John and St Helen More images
Church of St Mary	Lydiard Park, West Swindon	Church	17th century	17 January 1955	SU1039584772; 51°33′42″N 1°51′05″W	1023470	Church of St Mary More images
Lydiard Park	West Swindon	Country House	17th century	17 January 1955	SU1037384753; 51°33′42″N 1°51′06″W	1198420	Lydiard Park More images

== Trowbridge ==
Name	Location	Type	Completed	Date designated	Grid ref. Geo-coordinates	Entry number	Image
Lloyd's Bank	Trowbridge	House	c. 1730	29 December 1950	ST8555158077; 51°19′18″N 2°12′31″W	1021586	Lloyd's Bank More images
Lovemead House	Trowbridge	House	17th century	29 December 1950	ST8587258087; 51°19′18″N 2°12′15″W	1021639	Lovemead House More images
Midland Bank	Trowbridge	Building	1727 and 1741	29 December 1950	ST8564958000; 51°19′15″N 2°12′26″W	1284198	Midland Bank More images
Parade House	Trowbridge	House	c. 1730	29 December 1950	ST8546958067; 51°19′17″N 2°12′36″W	1364230	Parade House More images
68 Fore Street	Trowbridge	House	before 1723	29 December 1950	ST8549258090; 51°19′18″N 2°12′34″W	1021588	68 Fore Street
Parish Church of St James	Trowbridge	Parish Church	Late 15th century	29 December 1950	ST8564158064; 51°19′17″N 2°12′27″W	1284401	Parish Church of St James More images

== Wiltshire ==
Name	Location	Type	Completed	Date designated	Grid ref. Geo-coordinates	Entry number	Image
Church of St Michael	Aldbourne	Anglican Church	Medieval	22 August 1966	SU2638875825; 51°28′51″N 1°37′17″W	1034152	Church of St Michael More images
Church of St Andrew	Boscombe, Allington	Anglican Church	17th century	18 February 1958	SU2005438562; 51°08′46″N 1°42′53″W	1183690	Church of St Andrew More images
Church of St Mary	Alton Barnes	Parish Church	C10-C11	27 May 1964	SU1076962027; 51°21′26″N 1°50′48″W	1364707	Church of St Mary More images
Norrington Manor with Wall and Gate Piers	Alvediston	Cross Passage House	Late 14th century	6 January 1966	ST9662223806; 51°00′49″N 2°02′58″W	1318666	Norrington Manor with Wall and Gate Piers More images
Amesbury Abbey	Amesbury	House	1859	10 January 1953	SU1509741717; 51°10′28″N 1°47′08″W	1131079	Amesbury Abbey More images
Church of St Mary and St Melor	Amesbury	Parish Church, formerly abbey church	12th century	18 February 1958	SU1517641435; 51°10′19″N 1°47′04″W	1182066	Church of St Mary and St Melor More images
West Amesbury House	West Amesbury, Amesbury	House	15th century	10 January 1953	SU1422141491; 51°10′21″N 1°47′53″W	1318515	West Amesbury House More images
Church of the Holy Cross	Ashton Keynes	Parish Church	12th century	17 January 1955	SU0417094392; 51°38′54″N 1°56′28″W	1023045	Church of the Holy Cross More images
Barn at Great Chalfield Manor	Great Chalfield (west side), Atworth	Squash Court	1986	13 November 1962	ST8598463235; 51°22′05″N 2°12′10″W	1263048	Barn at Great Chalfield Manor More images
Church of All Saints	Great Chalfield (east side), Atworth	Church	15th century	13 November 1962	ST8604563208; 51°22′04″N 2°12′07″W	1250904	Church of All Saints More images
Great Chalfield Manor	Great Chalfield (west side), Atworth	House	16th century	13 November 1962	ST8601163195; 51°22′04″N 2°12′08″W	1250902	Great Chalfield Manor More images
Avebury Manor	Avebury	Cross Passage House	c. 1557	27 February 1958	SU0988969997; 51°25′44″N 1°51′33″W	1033785	Avebury Manor More images
Church of St James	Avebury	Church	Anglo Saxon	22 August 1966	SU0997669968; 51°25′43″N 1°51′28″W	1193084	Church of St James More images
Great Barn at Avebury Manor	Avebury	Barn	Restored 1978	22 August 1966	SU1003470034; 51°25′45″N 1°51′25″W	1286423	Great Barn at Avebury Manor More images
Church of St Martin	Barford St Martin	Anglican Church	16th century	23 March 1960	SU0565331388; 51°04′54″N 1°55′14″W	1146188	Church of St Martin More images
Village Cross to North West of Church of St Martin	Barford St Martin	Village Cross	Probably early medieval	23 March 1960	SU0563431409; 51°04′55″N 1°55′15″W	1182976	Village Cross to North West of Church of St Martin More images
Church of St James	Berwick St. James	Anglican Church	17th century	23 March 1960	SU0718239155; 51°09′06″N 1°53′55″W	1146243	Church of St James More images
Church of St Nicholas	Biddestone	Anglican Church	Mid 19th century	20 December 1960	ST8618173547; 51°27′39″N 2°12′01″W	1198839	Church of St Nicholas More images
Church of St Mary the Virgin	Bishops Cannings	Anglican Church	13th century	19 March 1962	SU0377364181; 51°22′36″N 1°56′50″W	1193298	Church of St Mary the Virgin More images
Church of St John the Baptist	Bishopstone	Anglican Church	12th century	23 March 1960	SU0843626524; 51°02′17″N 1°52′52″W	1146195	Church of St John the Baptist More images
Chapel Plaister	Chapel Plaister, Box	Anglican Church	1985	20 December 1960	ST8399367853; 51°24′34″N 2°13′54″W	1250523	Chapel Plaister More images
Church of St Christopher	Ditteridge	Anglican Church	1860	20 December 1960	ST8180269516; 51°25′28″N 2°15′47″W	1285201	Church of St Christopher More images
Church of St Thomas à Becket	Box	Priests House	Late 14th century or 15th century	20 December 1960	ST8230668481; 51°24′54″N 2°15′21″W	1180500	Church of St Thomas à Becket More images
Hazelbury Manor	Hazelbury Manor, Box	Detached House	17th century	20 December 1960	ST8352868382; 51°24′51″N 2°14′18″W	1363618	Hazelbury Manor More images
Boyton Manor	Boyton	Country House	1618	11 September 1968	ST9505739544; 51°09′18″N 2°04′19″W	1036346	Boyton Manor More images
Church of St Mary	Boyton	Anglican Church	14th century	1 July 1986	ST9504539566; 51°09′19″N 2°04′20″W	1284200	Church of St Mary More images
Barton Farmhouse	Bradford-on-Avon	Farmhouse	late medieval	18 April 1952	ST8233660506; 51°20′36″N 2°15′18″W	1184214	Barton Farmhouse More images
Belcombe Court	Bradford-on-Avon	Country House	17th century	18 April 1952	ST8173860633; 51°20′40″N 2°15′49″W	1036018	Belcombe Court More images
Church of St Lawrence	Bradford-on-Avon	Church	10th century	18 April 1952	ST8241960914; 51°20′49″N 2°15′14″W	1036034	Church of St Lawrence More images
Holy Trinity Church	Bradford-on-Avon	Church	19th century	18 April 1952	ST8241260878; 51°20′48″N 2°15′14″W	1364540	Holy Trinity Church More images
The Granary at Barton Farm	Bradford-on-Avon	Grange	C14/C15	18 April 1952	ST8234560462; 51°20′35″N 2°15′17″W	1036096	The Granary at Barton Farm More images
The Hall	Bradford-on-Avon	House	about 1610	18 April 1952	ST8287060899; 51°20′49″N 2°14′50″W	1200529	The Hall More images
The Town Bridge and Chapel	Bradford-on-Avon	Bridge and chapel	13th century	18 April 1952	ST8261460892; 51°20′49″N 2°15′04″W	1036011	The Town Bridge and Chapel More images
Tithe Barn at Barton Farm	Bradford-on-Avon	Tithe Barn	Early 14th century	18 April 1952	ST8231760433; 51°20′34″N 2°15′19″W	1184239	Tithe Barn at Barton Farm More images
Church of St Martin	Bremhill	Anglican Church	1850	20 December 1960	ST9797273003; 51°27′22″N 2°01′50″W	1199069	Church of St Martin More images
Church of St Michael	Brinkworth	Anglican Church	1889	28 October 1959	SU0129284414; 51°33′31″N 1°58′58″W	1363920	Church of St Michael More images
Church of St Peter and attached Radnor Mausoleum	Britford	Anglican Church	18th century	23 March 1960	SU1628528453; 51°03′19″N 1°46′08″W	1023791	Church of St Peter and attached Radnor Mausoleum More images
Church of All Saints	Broad Chalke	Church	Medieval	23 March 1960	SU0408025347; 51°01′39″N 1°56′36″W	1146136	Church of All Saints More images
Church of St Peter ad Vincula	Broad Hinton	Church	Medieval	27 February 1958	SU1053476327; 51°29′09″N 1°50′59″W	1365589	Church of St Peter ad Vincula More images
Church of St Nicholas	Bromham	Anglican Church	Medieval	19 March 1962	ST9630965188; 51°23′09″N 2°03′16″W	1033887	Church of St Nicholas More images
Church of St Mary the Virgin	Broughton Gifford	Church	14th century	13 November 1962	ST8779863127; 51°22′01″N 2°10′36″W	1251257	Church of St Mary the Virgin More images
Church of St Leonard	Bulford	Anglican Church	16th century	18 December 1958	SU1658043721; 51°11′33″N 1°45′51″W	1131034	Church of St Leonard More images
Church of St Mary	Calne	Church	c1160-70	19 May 1950	ST9989970905; 51°26′14″N 2°00′10″W	1271365	Church of St Mary More images
Bowood House	Bowood, Derry Hill & Studley	Country House	1955–1957	5 September 1972	ST9748169950; 51°25′43″N 2°02′15″W	1253268	Bowood House More images
The Mausoleum at Bowood House	Bowood, Derry Hill & Studley	Mausoleum	1761–65	20 December 1960	ST9612169422; 51°25′26″N 2°03′26″W	1253402	The Mausoleum at Bowood House More images
Church of St Andrew	Castle Combe	Anglican Church	19th century	20 December 1960	ST8415277189; 51°29′36″N 2°13′47″W	1022864	Church of St Andrew More images
Charlton Park House	Charlton Park, Charlton	Country House	c. 1607	12 December 1951	ST9525589175; 51°36′05″N 2°04′12″W	1022216	Charlton Park House More images
Church of All Saints	Yatesbury, Cherhill	Anglican Church	1855	20 December 1960	SU0633771490; 51°26′33″N 1°54′37″W	1363771	Church of All Saints More images
Church of St Peter	Cheverell Magna	Anglican Church	Medieval	19 March 1962	ST9806454307; 51°17′16″N 2°01′45″W	1035786	Church of St Peter More images
The Ivy and the Ivy West Wing	Chippenham	House	1996	25 April 1950	ST9173173199; 51°27′28″N 2°07′13″W	1268171	Upload Photo
The Yelde Hall and the Council Chamber	Chippenham	Town Hall	Early 15th century	25 April 1950	ST9218373234; 51°27′29″N 2°06′50″W	1267996	The Yelde Hall and the Council Chamber More images
Sheldon Manor	Sheldon Manor, Chippenham Without	Kitchen	1911	20 December 1960	ST8865874149; 51°27′58″N 2°09′53″W	1022907	Sheldon Manor More images
Church of St John the Baptist	Chirton	Anglican Church	Medieval	19 March 1962	SU0734157641; 51°19′04″N 1°53′46″W	1035807	Church of St John the Baptist More images
Church of All Saints	Christian Malford	Anglican Church	18th century	20 December 1960	ST9599578420; 51°30′17″N 2°03′33″W	1199647	Church of All Saints More images
Chute Lodge	Chute Forest	Country House	1768	13 June 1988	SU3094551460; 51°15′41″N 1°33′28″W	1364573	Upload Photo
Clarendon House	Clarendon Park	House	1717–1737	23 March 1960	SU1946528541; 51°03′21″N 1°43′25″W	1023949	Upload Photo
St Marie's Grange	Alderbury, Clarendon Park	House	c. 1841	9 February 1973	SU1731728163; 51°03′09″N 1°45′16″W	1023953	St Marie's Grange More images
Church of St Peter	Clyffe Pypard	Parish Church	15th century	17 January 1955	SU0746076978; 51°29′30″N 1°53′38″W	1022655	Church of St Peter More images
Church of St John the Baptist	Colerne	Church	Medieval	20 December 1960	ST8209371136; 51°26′20″N 2°15′32″W	1022922	Church of St John the Baptist More images
Church of St Swithin	Compton Bassett	Anglican Church	1865	20 December 1960	SU0308371599; 51°26′36″N 1°57′25″W	1363781	Church of St Swithin More images
Compton Park House	Compton Park, Compton Chamberlayne	Country House	17th century	23 March 1960	SU0292230117; 51°04′13″N 1°57′35″W	1146151	Compton Park House More images
Church of St Michael	Coombe Bissett	Anglican Church	Mid 19th century	23 March 1960	SU1080426320; 51°02′10″N 1°50′50″W	1023802	Church of St Michael More images
Church of St Bartholomew	Corsham	Church	c. 1880	20 December 1960	ST8742370549; 51°26′02″N 2°10′56″W	1021975	Church of St Bartholomew More images
Congregational Chapel	Monk's Lane, Corsham	Congregational Chapel	1662	20 December 1960	ST8765368546; 51°24′57″N 2°10′44″W	1363968	Congregational Chapel More images
Corsham Court	Corsham Court, Corsham	Country House	1582	20 December 1960	ST8741570684; 51°26′06″N 2°10′57″W	1022004	Corsham Court More images
Bath House at Corsham Court	Corsham Court, Corsham	Bath House	c1761-1763	20 December 1960	ST8739470859; 51°26′12″N 2°10′58″W	1182390	Bath House at Corsham Court More images
Hungerford Almshouses	Corsham	Almshouse	1668	1 August 1986	ST8732570176; 51°25′50″N 2°11′01″W	1022101	Hungerford Almshouses More images
Churchyard Cross in Churchyard, Church of St Mary	Cricklade	Cross	14th century	17 January 1955	SU1013893853; 51°38′36″N 1°51′18″W	1023108	Churchyard Cross in Churchyard, Church of St Mary More images
Church of St Sampson	Cricklade, Wiltshire	Anglican Church	19th century	17 January 1955	SU0992693537; 51°38′26″N 1°51′29″W	1023081	Church of St Sampson More images
Church of All Saints	Crudwell	Anglican Church	1868	28 October 1959	ST9563892901; 51°38′06″N 2°03′52″W	1363888	Church of All Saints More images
Church of St James	Dauntsey	Church	1680	28 October 1959	ST9799382468; 51°32′28″N 2°01′49″W	1199909	Church of St James More images
Brownston House	Devizes	House	1720	19 September 1972	SU0054761614; 51°21′13″N 1°59′37″W	1251612	Brownston House More images
Forecourt Wall of Brownston House	Devizes	Wall	1720	19 September 1972	SU0053961604; 51°21′13″N 1°59′37″W	1251613	Forecourt Wall of Brownston House More images
Church of St John the Baptist	Devizes	Church	Medieval	9 April 1954	SU0046961241; 51°21′01″N 1°59′41″W	1262359	Church of St John the Baptist More images
Church of St Mary	Devizes	Church	Medieval	9 April 1954	SU0059861606; 51°21′13″N 1°59′34″W	1251640	Church of St Mary More images
Devizes Castle including Glass House and Garden Walls encircling West Side of Mound	Devizes	Castle	12th century	19 September 1972	SU0024961342; 51°21′04″N 1°59′52″W	1249366	Devizes Castle including Glass House and Garden Walls encircling West Side of Mound More images
17 Market Place	Devizes	House	Early 18th century	9 April 1954	SU0029561553; 51°21′11″N 1°59′50″W	1250423	17 Market Place
Church of St Mary	Dilton Marsh, Old Dilton	Anglican Church	17th century	11 September 1968	ST8586049039; 51°14′25″N 2°12′14″W	1021476	Church of St Mary More images
Church of St Mary the Virgin	Dinton	Anglican Church	19th century roof	23 March 1960	SU0093231669; 51°05′04″N 1°59′17″W	1146120	Church of St Mary the Virgin More images
Hydes House with attached Walls and Gatepiers	Dinton	House	Earlier	23 March 1960	SU0085831713; 51°05′05″N 1°59′21″W	1146122	Hydes House with attached Walls and Gatepiers More images
Church of St Mary	Donhead St. Mary	Anglican Church	19th century	6 January 1966	ST9067224437; 51°01′09″N 2°08′04″W	1318792	Church of St Mary More images
Church of St Laurence	Downton	Church	Mid 18th century	23 March 1960	SU1811421616; 50°59′37″N 1°44′36″W	1023875	Church of St Laurence More images
Manor House	Downton	Detached House	Early 14th century	4 July 1985	SU1807721663; 50°59′39″N 1°44′38″W	1023856	Manor House More images
Trafalgar House	Standlynch, Downton	Country House	Shortly before 1766	23 March 1960	SU1859123762; 51°00′47″N 1°44′11″W	1183796	Trafalgar House More images
The Moot House with attached Kitchen	Downton	House	Early 18th century	23 March 1960	SU1822921411; 50°59′31″N 1°44′30″W	1023898	The Moot House with attached Kitchen More images
Church of St Andrew	Great Durnford, Durnford	Anglican Church	16th century	18 February 1958	SU1364238324; 51°08′38″N 1°48′23″W	1182845	Church of St Andrew More images
Little Durnford Manor	Little Durnford, Durnford	Manor House	Late 17th century	10 January 1953	SU1247534246; 51°06′27″N 1°49′23″W	1284299	Little Durnford Manor More images
Church of St Mary	East Knoyle	Anglican Church	1829	6 January 1966	ST8802130532; 51°04′26″N 2°10′20″W	1131168	Church of St Mary More images
Church of St Mary, St Katherine and All Saints	Edington	Church	1352–1361	11 September 1968	ST9264153314; 51°16′44″N 2°06′25″W	1364257	Church of St Mary, St Katherine and All Saints More images
Conduit Head (spring) serving Edington Priory	Edington	Spring	14th century	11 September 1968	ST9244152982; 51°16′33″N 2°06′35″W	1181417	Conduit Head (spring) serving Edington Priory More images
Remains of Abbey or Priory in Grounds of the Monastery Garden at Edington	Edington	Gate	15th century	11 September 1968	ST9269253352; 51°16′45″N 2°06′22″W	1021493	Remains of Abbey or Priory in Grounds of the Monastery Garden at Edington More images
The Monastery Garden	Edington	House	possibly 16th century	11 September 1968	ST9275153384; 51°16′46″N 2°06′19″W	1021492	The Monastery Garden More images
The Priory	Edington	Detached House	late medieval	11 September 1968	ST9260553358; 51°16′46″N 2°06′27″W	1285064	The Priory More images
Church of All Saints and St Margaret	Enford	Anglican Church	Medieval	27 May 1964	SU1406151632; 51°15′49″N 1°47′59″W	1300358	Church of All Saints and St Margaret More images
Church of All Saints	Fonthill Bishop	Anglican Church	1871 chancel restoration	6 January 1966	ST9347033013; 51°05′47″N 2°05′41″W	1183785	Church of All Saints More images
Nos 65 and 66 (the Archway) with Flanking Walls	Fonthill Park, Fonthill Bishop	Archway	c. 1860	6 January 1966	ST9332532707; 51°05′37″N 2°05′48″W	1318805	Nos 65 and 66 (the Archway) with Flanking Walls More images
Church of St Mary	Great Bedwyn	Anglican Church	Medieval	22 August 1966	SU2775664277; 51°22′37″N 1°36′09″W	1365492	Church of St Mary More images
Crofton Pumping Station	Great Bedwyn	Pumping house	1802–09	1 May 1985	SU2614662269; 51°21′32″N 1°37′33″W	1034049	Crofton Pumping Station More images
Tottenham House	Great Bedwyn	Great House	Pre 1825	22 August 1966	SU2498563926; 51°22′26″N 1°38′33″W	1183809	Tottenham House More images
Church of St Peter and Paul	Great Somerford	Anglican Church	1865	28 October 1959	ST9643483100; 51°32′48″N 2°03′10″W	1022516	Church of St Peter and Paul More images
Church of All Saints	Ham	Anglican Church	1733–40	30 July 1986	SU3294862924; 51°21′52″N 1°31′41″W	1300266	Church of All Saints More images
Church of St Giles	Imber, Heytesbury	Anglican Church	1849	11 December 1987	ST9651148371; 51°14′04″N 2°03′05″W	1036472	Church of St Giles More images
Church of St Peter and St Paul	Heytesbury	Anglican Church	19th century	11 September 1968	ST925426; 51°10′56″N 2°06′31″W	1036357	Church of St Peter and St Paul More images
Early Wing at Brook Hall	Heywood	Farmhouse	Medieval	11 September 1968	ST8504753439; 51°16′48″N 2°12′57″W	1285019	Early Wing at Brook Hall
Church of St Laurence	Hilmarton	Anglican Church	19th century	20 December 1960	SU0199675341; 51°28′37″N 1°58′22″W	1300591	Church of St Laurence More images
Boathouse and Covered Bridge at Longleat House	Longleat Park, Horningsham	Boat House	c. 1807	11 September 1968	ST8090343138; 51°11′14″N 2°16′29″W	1200450	Boathouse and Covered Bridge at Longleat House More images
Longleat House	Longleat Park, Horningsham, Wiltshire	Country House	16th century	11 September 1968	ST8070543074; 51°11′12″N 2°16′39″W	1364361	Longleat House More images
Lodge at Longleat House	Longleat Park, Horningsham, Wiltshire	Gate	1860s	11 September 1968	ST8122141913; 51°10′34″N 2°16′12″W	1200476	Upload Photo
Orangery with walled garden to rear at Longleat House	Longleat Park, Horningsham	Garden Wall	c. 1807	11 September 1968	ST8087643120; 51°11′13″N 2°16′30″W	1036392	Orangery with walled garden to rear at Longleat House More images
Stables at Longleat House	Longleat Park, Horningsham	Coachmans Cottage	1968	11 September 1968	ST8077243080; 51°11′12″N 2°16′35″W	1200342	Stables at Longleat House More images
Bradfield Manor Farmhouse	Hullavington	Farmhouse	19th century	12 December 1951	ST8953583003; 51°32′45″N 2°09′08″W	1198808	Upload Photo
Church of St Mary	Hullavington	Anglican Church	1870	28 October 1959	ST8942882052; 51°32′14″N 2°09′14″W	1356040	Church of St Mary More images
Church of All Saints	Idmiston	Anglican Church	1866–67	18 February 1958	SU1971937353; 51°08′06″N 1°43′10″W	1023956	Church of All Saints More images
Front Boundary Wall with Gateway and Gate Piers at Keevil Manor	Keevil	Gate	c. 1600	11 September 1968	ST9186358081; 51°19′18″N 2°07′05″W	1251456	Upload Photo
Front Garden Walls with Archway at Keevil Manor	Keevil	Gate	1611	11 September 1968	ST9189558122; 51°19′20″N 2°07′04″W	1262739	Upload Photo
Keevil Manor with attached Stables	Keevil	House	Circa 1580, porch added 1611, additions & modifications 1912	11 September 1968	ST9191458144; 51°19′20″N 2°07′03″W	1251455	Upload Photo
Talboys	Keevil	House	Late C14 to mid C15, east wing added 1867	11 September 1968	ST9183858071; 51°19′18″N 2°07′07″W	1262752	Talboys More images
Church of St Margaret	Knook	Anglican Church	17th century	11 September 1968	ST9374441816; 51°10′32″N 2°05′27″W	1285068	Church of St Margaret More images
The Manor House	Knook	Detached House	16th century	11 September 1968	ST9374041776; 51°10′31″N 2°05′27″W	1364327	The Manor House More images
Bewley Court	Lacock	Cross Wing House	Early 15th century	20 December 1960	ST9263068509; 51°24′56″N 2°06′27″W	1363958	Upload Photo
Bowden Park	Bowden Hill, Lacock	Country House	1796	20 December 1960	ST937682; 51°24′47″N 2°05′29″W	1022132	Bowden Park More images
Church of St Cyriac	Lacock	Anglican Church	17th century	20 December 1960	ST9170868566; 51°24′58″N 2°07′14″W	1198216	Church of St Cyriac More images
Lacock Abbey with stable yard	Lacock Abbey, Lacock	Abbey	13th century to 15th century	20 December 1960	ST9193268418; 51°24′53″N 2°07′03″W	1283853	Lacock Abbey with stable yard More images
Tithe Barn at Manor Farm	Lacock	Tithe Barn	14th century	20 December 1960	ST9165668458; 51°24′54″N 2°07′17″W	1198376	Tithe Barn at Manor Farm More images
Church of St Peter	Langley Burrell Without	Anglican Church	1890	20 December 1960	ST9276775794; 51°28′52″N 2°06′20″W	1199423	Church of St Peter More images
Church of St John the Baptist	Latton with Eisey, Latton	Anglican Church	1858–63	17 January 1955	SU0932995797; 51°39′39″N 1°51′59″W	1284123	Church of St John the Baptist More images
Milford Mill Bridge	Milford, Laverstock	Bridge	14th century	28 February 1952	SU1575829765; 51°04′01″N 1°46′35″W	1242884	Milford Mill Bridge More images
Church of St Michael	Little Bedwyn	Anglican Church	19th century	22 August 1966	SU2912466199; 51°23′39″N 1°34′58″W	1184327	Church of St Michael More images
Church of St John the Baptist	Little Somerford	Church	c. 1860	28 October 1959	ST9672584368; 51°33′29″N 2°02′55″W	1300525	Church of St John the Baptist More images
Church of Saint Mary and Saint Ethelbert	Luckington	Anglican Church	18th century	28 October 1959	ST8373284047; 51°33′18″N 2°14′10″W	1199767	Church of Saint Mary and Saint Ethelbert More images
Biddesden House	Ludgershall	Country House	1710–11	4 June 1952	SU2952951007; 51°15′27″N 1°34′42″W	1035997	Biddesden House More images
Church of St James	Ludgershall	Church	Medieval	27 May 1964	SU2631450885; 51°15′23″N 1°37′27″W	1036004	Church of St James More images
Church of All Saints	Maiden Bradley with Yarnfield	Anglican Church	18th century	6 January 1966	ST8036438657; 51°08′49″N 2°16′56″W	1318479	Church of All Saints More images
Malmesbury Abbey	Malmesbury	Abbey	675–705	18 January 1949	ST9328087320; 51°35′05″N 2°05′54″W	1269316	Malmesbury Abbey More images
Abbey House and attached Rear Wall at Malmesbury Abbey	Malmesbury	House	c. 1540	18 January 1949	ST9334087379; 51°35′07″N 2°05′51″W	1269325	Abbey House and attached Rear Wall at Malmesbury Abbey More images
Court House to rear of No 27, St Johns St. and attached Wall	Malmesbury	Abbey	1623	18 January 1949	ST9353086969; 51°34′54″N 2°05′41″W	1269247	Court House to rear of No 27, St Johns St. and attached Wall More images
St Pauls Bell Tower	Malmesbury	House	Before c1623	18 January 1949	ST9325287237; 51°35′02″N 2°05′56″W	1269428	St Pauls Bell Tower More images
Malmesbury Market Cross	Malmesbury	Market Cross	Late 15th century to Early 16th century	18 January 1949	ST9330287228; 51°35′02″N 2°05′53″W	1269291	Malmesbury Market Cross More images
The Old Bell Hotel and Attached Front Area Walls and Railings	Malmesbury	Abbey	Early 13th century	18 January 1949	ST9322587331; 51°35′05″N 2°05′57″W	1269521	The Old Bell Hotel and Attached Front Area Walls and Railings More images
Church of St Peter	Manningford Bruce, Manningford	Anglican Church	1882	27 May 1964	SU1396458025; 51°19′16″N 1°48′04″W	1300103	Church of St Peter More images
Church of All Saints	Marden	Anglican Church	1885	19 March 1962	SU0862057876; 51°19′12″N 1°52′40″W	1035827	Church of All Saints More images
Church of St Mary	Market Lavington	Anglican Church	c. 1860	19 March 1962	SU0140454134; 51°17′11″N 1°58′53″W	1035835	Church of St Mary More images
The Old House	Market Lavington	Aisled House	Early 14th century	19 March 1962	SU0147454202; 51°17′13″N 1°58′49″W	1035851	The Old House More images
Marlborough College: C House (Main Block)	Marlborough	College	Early Modern. 18C	18 July 1949	SU1848468684; 51°25′01″N 1°44′08″W	1273163	Marlborough College: C House (Main Block) More images
Parish Church of St Mary	Marlborough	Church	1091	18 July 1949	SU1891969244; 51°25′19″N 1°43′45″W	1034302	Parish Church of St Mary More images
Beanacre Old Manor	Beanacre, Melksham Without	Manor House	Late 14th century	13 February 1985	ST9016165783; 51°23′28″N 2°08′34″W	1021755	Upload Photo
Church of St Michael the Archangel	Mere	Anglican Church	Post 1499	6 January 1966	ST8111132252; 51°05′21″N 2°16′16″W	1130755	Church of St Michael the Archangel More images
Woodlands Manor	Mere	Manor House	Mid 14th century	6 January 1966	ST8150231174; 51°04′47″N 2°15′56″W	1200753	Upload Photo
Church of St John the Baptist	Mildenhall	Sundial	C18-C19	22 August 1966	SU2099469476; 51°25′26″N 1°41′58″W	1365445	Church of St John the Baptist More images
Fyfield Manor	Fyfield, Milton Lilbourne	House	16th century	4 June 1952	SU1759460540; 51°20′37″N 1°44′56″W	1286502	Upload Photo
Church of St Leonard	Upper Minety, Minety	Anglican Church	1896	28 October 1959	SU0095291177; 51°37′10″N 1°59′16″W	1363901	Church of St Leonard More images
Monkton Farleigh Manor	Monkton Farleigh	Country House	Probably Late 16th century	13 November 1962	ST8062865584; 51°23′20″N 2°16′47″W	1364109	Monkton Farleigh Manor More images
Remains of the Refectory at Monkton Farleigh Manor	Monkton Farleigh	Cluniac Monastery	1125	13 November 1962	ST8058565608; 51°23′21″N 2°16′49″W	1021833	Upload Photo
Church of All Saints	Netheravon	Anglican Church	19th century	27 May 1964	SU1478848395; 51°14′04″N 1°47′22″W	1033956	Church of All Saints More images
Church of St Mary the Virgin	Nettleton, Burton	Anglican Church	1960	20 December 1960	ST8160979375; 51°30′47″N 2°15′59″W	1022949	Church of St Mary the Virgin More images
Wilbury House	Newton Tony	House	c1710/12-1725	10 January 1953	SU2217341401; 51°10′17″N 1°41′03″W	1300348	Wilbury House More images
Church of St James	North Wraxall	Anglican Church	Late 18th century	20 December 1960	ST8180375064; 51°28′27″N 2°15′48″W	1022991	Church of St James More images
Parish Church	Foxley, Norton	Anglican Church	c. 1708	28 October 1959	ST8969885953; 51°34′20″N 2°09′00″W	1023219	Parish Church More images
Church of All Saints	Oaksey	Anglican Church	1633	28 October 1959	ST9909193630; 51°38′29″N 2°00′52″W	1022262	Church of All Saints More images
Longford Castle	Longford Park, Odstock	Castle	1591	23 March 1960	SU1714026670; 51°02′21″N 1°45′25″W	1355742	Longford Castle More images
Church of St Andrew	Ogbourne St Andrew	Anglican Church	15th century	27 February 1958	SU1883472345; 51°26′59″N 1°43′49″W	1033854	Church of St Andrew More images
Barn at Hallam Farm Buildings	Southend, Ogbourne St. George	Barn	C20	2 September 1986	SU1986073704; 51°27′43″N 1°42′56″W	1284436	Upload Photo
Church of St John the Baptist	Pewsey	Anglican Church	1861	27 May 1964	SU1636759897; 51°20′17″N 1°45′59″W	1035703	Church of St John the Baptist More images
Church of All Saints	Farley, Pitton and Farley	Anglican Church	1688–90	23 March 1960	SU2244129591; 51°03′55″N 1°40′52″W	1135703	Church of All Saints More images
The Almshouses (Fox's Hospital)	Farley, Pitton and Farley	House	1688–90	23 March 1960	SU2244429524; 51°03′53″N 1°40′52″W	1135704	The Almshouses (Fox's Hospital) More images
Church of St Mary	Potterne	Anglican Church	1598	19 March 1962	ST9954758542; 51°19′34″N 2°00′28″W	1258968	Church of St Mary More images
Porch House	Potterne	House	1874	19 March 1962	ST9949158452; 51°19′31″N 2°00′31″W	1273182	Porch House More images
Church of St Mary	Purton	Anglican Church	1872	17 January 1955	SU0968487173; 51°35′00″N 1°51′42″W	1283956	Church of St Mary More images
Axford Farmhouse	Axford, Ramsbury	Farmhouse	By 1966	22 August 1966	SU2509570284; 51°25′52″N 1°38′25″W	1300471	Axford Farmhouse More images
Church of the Holy Cross	Ramsbury	Church	1775	22 August 1966	SU2738271592; 51°26′34″N 1°36′27″W	1365476	Church of the Holy Cross More images
Littlecote House	Ramsbury	Courtyard House	c1500-1570	22 August 1966	SU3044670379; 51°25′54″N 1°33′48″W	1300540	Littlecote House More images
Ramsbury Manor	Ramsbury	Bishops Palace	site of	22 August 1966	SU2569570981; 51°26′14″N 1°37′54″W	1184029	Ramsbury Manor More images
Newhouse	Redlynch	Country House	c. 1619	23 March 1960	SU2182421390; 50°59′29″N 1°41′26″W	1300128	Newhouse More images
Church of the Holy Cross	Seend	Anglican Church	18th century	19 March 1962	ST9441160928; 51°20′51″N 2°04′54″W	1243604	Church of the Holy Cross More images
Church of St Cosmas and St Damian	Sherrington	Anglican Church	1624	11 September 1968	ST9603239199; 51°09′07″N 2°03′29″W	1364328	Church of St Cosmas and St Damian More images
Church of the Holy Cross	Sherston	Anglican Church	19th century	28 October 1959	ST8539286028; 51°34′23″N 2°12′44″W	1023223	Church of the Holy Cross More images
Manor Farmhouse	South Wraxall	Farmhouse	1962	13 November 1962	ST8344865597; 51°23′21″N 2°14′21″W	1021854	Upload Photo
South Wraxall Manor, with Garden Wall to South	South Wraxall	Hall House	Early 15th century	13 November 1962	ST8331265463; 51°23′17″N 2°14′28″W	1021853	South Wraxall Manor, with Garden Wall to South More images
Church of St Mary	Stapleford	Anglican Church	17th century	23 March 1960	SU0704937368; 51°08′08″N 1°54′02″W	1146222	Church of St Mary More images
Church of St Mary the Virgin	Steeple Ashton	Church	1670	11 September 1968	ST9064657114; 51°18′47″N 2°08′08″W	1252395	Church of St Mary the Virgin More images
Church of All Saints	Steeple Langford	Church	1635	23 March 1960	SU0364537450; 51°08′11″N 1°56′57″W	1318701	Church of All Saints More images
Church of St John	Stockton	Anglican Church	17th century	11 September 1968	ST9819638221; 51°08′36″N 2°01′38″W	1181597	Church of St John More images
Stockton House	Stockton Park, Stockton	Country House	1580s	21 July 1950	ST9768838674; 51°08′50″N 2°02′04″W	1284871	Stockton House More images
Church of St Peter	Stourton with Gasper	Anglican Church	1720	6 January 1966	ST7763733945; 51°06′16″N 2°19′15″W	1318468	Church of St Peter More images
Rockwork Bridge at Stourhead	Stourhead Gardens, Stourton with Gasper	Arch	1762–1765	6 January 1966	ST7726633837; 51°06′12″N 2°19′34″W	1199172	Rockwork Bridge at Stourhead More images
St Peter's Pump at Stourhead	Stourhead Park, Stourton with Gasper	Grotto	18th century	6 January 1966	ST7610335399; 51°07′03″N 2°20′34″W	1131107	St Peter's Pump at Stourhead More images
Stourhead House	Stourhead Park, Stourton with Gasper	Country House	1721–24	6 January 1966	ST7775434347; 51°06′29″N 2°19′09″W	1131104	Stourhead House More images
The Bristol High Cross	Stourhead Gardens, Stourton with Gasper	Statue	1400–1981	9 September 1987	ST7755233964; 51°06′16″N 2°19′19″W	1318471	The Bristol High Cross More images
The Convent at Stourhead	Stourhead Park, Stourton with Gasper	House	c. 1765	6 January 1966	ST7568734692; 51°06′40″N 2°20′55″W	1318474	The Convent at Stourhead More images
The Gothic Cottage at Stourhead	Stourhead Gardens, Stourton with Gasper	Detached House	Probably mid 18th century	6 January 1966	ST7711434006; 51°06′18″N 2°19′42″W	1199233	The Gothic Cottage at Stourhead More images
The Grotto and the River God's Cave at Stourhead	Stourhead Gardens, Stourton with Gasper	Grotto	c. 1748	6 January 1966	ST7714934085; 51°06′20″N 2°19′40″W	1318473	The Grotto and the River God's Cave at Stourhead More images
The Obelisk at Stourhead	Stourhead Park, Stourton with Gasper	Obelisk	1746	6 January 1966	ST7732134500; 51°06′34″N 2°19′31″W	1283405	The Obelisk at Stourhead More images
The Palladian Bridge at Stourhead	Stourhead Gardens, Stourton with Gasper	Bridge	1762	6 January 1966	ST7743833952; 51°06′16″N 2°19′25″W	1131099	The Palladian Bridge at Stourhead More images
The Pantheon at Stourhead	Stourhead Gardens, Stourton with Gasper	Gate	1753–54	6 January 1966	ST7705933916; 51°06′15″N 2°19′45″W	1131102	The Pantheon at Stourhead More images
The Paradise Well at Stourhead	Stourhead Gardens, Stourton with Gasper	Urn	Probably late 18th century	6 January 1966	ST7741134022; 51°06′18″N 2°19′26″W	1283514	The Paradise Well at Stourhead More images
The Temple of Apollo at Stourhead	Stourhead Gardens, Stourton with Gasper	Temple	1765	6 January 1966	ST7738533831; 51°06′12″N 2°19′28″W	1131100	The Temple of Apollo at Stourhead More images
The Temple of Flora at Stourhead	Stourhead Gardens, Stourton with Gasper	Temple	c. 1772	6 January 1966	ST7742334015; 51°06′18″N 2°19′26″W	1318472	The Temple of Flora at Stourhead More images
Church of St Mary and St Lawrence	Stratford Tony	Anglican Church	18th century	23 March 1960	SU0918426392; 51°02′13″N 1°52′13″W	1181901	Church of St Mary and St Lawrence More images
Church of St John the Evangelist	Sutton Veny	Anglican Church	1866–68	1 July 1986	ST9026841721; 51°10′29″N 2°08′26″W	1036429	Church of St John the Evangelist More images
Church of St Mary	Tidworth	Church (redundant)	1878	7 March 1973	SU2354147696; 51°13′41″N 1°39′51″W	1093240	Church of St Mary More images
Church of St Thomas a Becket	Tilshead	Anglican Church	17th century	18 February 1958	SU0348347989; 51°13′52″N 1°57′05″W	1023968	Church of St Thomas a Becket More images
Inner Gatehouse at Place Farm	Tisbury	Farmhouse	Late 15th century	6 January 1966	ST9511129816; 51°04′04″N 2°04′16″W	1146019	Inner Gatehouse at Place Farm
Outer Gatehouse at Place Farm	Tisbury	Gate	15th century	6 January 1966	ST9514229787; 51°04′03″N 2°04′15″W	1300237	Outer Gatehouse at Place Farm More images
Place Farmhouse	Tisbury	Farmhouse	1966	6 January 1966	ST9510429834; 51°04′04″N 2°04′17″W	1184177	Place Farmhouse More images
Tithe Barn at Place Farm	Tisbury	Staddle Stone	15th century	6 January 1966	ST9517729840; 51°04′04″N 2°04′13″W	1318824	Tithe Barn at Place Farm More images
Church of St John the Baptist	Tisbury	Anglican Church	Tower rebuilt 1762	6 January 1966	ST9440829124; 51°03′41″N 2°04′52″W	1146017	Church of St John the Baptist More images
Old Wardour Castle	Wardour Park, Tisbury	Castle	1390s	25 October 1951	ST9386626336; 51°02′11″N 2°05′20″W	1183429	Old Wardour Castle More images
New Wardour Castle	Wardour Park, Tisbury	Country House	1770–76	25 October 1951	ST9279126926; 51°02′30″N 2°06′15″W	1146004	New Wardour Castle More images
Wardour Castle Chapel	New Wardour Castle, Tisbury	Chapel	1834	6 July 1987	ST9274726968; 51°02′31″N 2°06′17″W	1300093	Wardour Castle Chapel More images
Church of St Mary	Upavon	Anglican Church	1875	27 May 1964	SU1354855038; 51°17′40″N 1°48′25″W	1365553	Church of St Mary More images
Church of St Augustine (St Peter) with attached Railings	Upton Lovell	Anglican Church	17th century	11 September 1968	ST9448440841; 51°10′00″N 2°04′49″W	1181825	Church of St Augustine (St Peter) with attached Railings More images
Church of St Michael and All Angels	Urchfont	Anglican Church	1864	19 March 1962	SU0407357305; 51°18′53″N 1°56′35″W	1364609	Church of St Michael and All Angels More images
Portway House	Warminster	House	1722	28 April 1952	ST8735445364; 51°12′26″N 2°10′57″W	1364442	Portway House More images
Borbach Chantry	West Dean	Chantry Chapel	1333	23 March 1960	SU2558127454; 51°02′45″N 1°38′11″W	1184418	Borbach Chantry More images
Church of All Saints	West Lavington	Anglican Church	1847	19 March 1962	SU0064553031; 51°16′35″N 1°59′32″W	1198014	Church of All Saints More images
Parish Church of All Saints	Westbury	Church	1747	29 December 1950	ST8737551430; 51°15′43″N 2°10′56″W	1180510	Parish Church of All Saints More images
Church of St Mary the Virgin	Westwood	Anglican Church	15th century	13 November 1962	ST8121659014; 51°19′48″N 2°16′16″W	1180693	Church of St Mary the Virgin More images
Westwood Manor	Westwood	Manor House	15th century	13 November 1962	ST8122459039; 51°19′48″N 2°16′15″W	1285342	Westwood Manor More images
Oare House	Oare	House	1740	4 June 1952	SU1559763012; 51°21′57″N 1°46′38″W	1035754	Oare House More images
Lake House	Wilsford cum Lake	House	1578	10 January 1953	SU1339138961; 51°08′59″N 1°48′36″W	1183238	Lake House More images
Casino at Wilton House	Wilton Park, Wilton	Casino	1757–1762	4 August 1951	SU0977630533; 51°04′27″N 1°51′43″W	1199840	Upload Photo
Church of St Mary and St Nicholas	Wilton	Church	19th century	4 August 1951	SU0948231288; 51°04′51″N 1°51′58″W	1365914	Church of St Mary and St Nicholas More images
Column of Venus Genetrix at Wilton House	Wilton Park, Wilton	Column	C3 AD	8 June 1978	SU1030330862; 51°04′37″N 1°51′16″W	1199991	Column of Venus Genetrix at Wilton House More images
Holbein Porch at Wilton House	Wilton Park, Wilton	Summerhouse	1951	4 August 1951	SU0965030996; 51°04′42″N 1°51′49″W	1199912	Holbein Porch at Wilton House More images
Loggia to west of Wilton House with rear wall and approach steps and quadrants	Wilton Park, Wilton	Wall	c. 1826	4 August 1951	SU0988831011; 51°04′42″N 1°51′37″W	1023768	Upload Photo
Palladian Bridge at Wilton House	Wilton Park, Wilton	Bridge	1736–1737	4 August 1951	SU0997530854; 51°04′37″N 1°51′32″W	1023763	Palladian Bridge at Wilton House More images
Park School House at Wilton House	Wilton Park, Wilton	Grotto	c. 1635	4 August 1951	SU1017231154; 51°04′47″N 1°51′22″W	1200089	Upload Photo
The Almonry at Wilton House	Wilton Park, Wilton	Almonry	14th century or 15th century	4 August 1951	SU0987331077; 51°04′44″N 1°51′38″W	1365922	Upload Photo
The Riding School at Wilton House	Wilton Park, Wilton	Pavilion	Before 1800	4 August 1951	SU0990431066; 51°04′44″N 1°51′36″W	1199905	Upload Photo
Triumphal Entrance Arch and Flanking Lodges at Wilton House	Wilton Park, Wilton	Gate	18th century	4 August 1951	SU0994331086; 51°04′44″N 1°51′34″W	1365920	Triumphal Entrance Arch and Flanking Lodges at Wilton House More images
Washern Grange at Wilton House	Wilton Park, Wilton	House	Modern	4 August 1951	SU0976730690; 51°04′32″N 1°51′43″W	1023764	Upload Photo
Wilton House	Salisbury, Wilton	Courtyard House	After 1544, finished 1563	4 August 1951	SU0993330976; 51°04′41″N 1°51′35″W	1023762	Wilton House More images
Dundas Aqueduct	Dundas, Winsley	Aqueduct	c. 1805	14 June 1988	ST7846862530; 51°21′41″N 2°18′38″W	1215193	Dundas Aqueduct More images
Church of St Mary the Virgin	Winterbourne Gunner, Winterbourne, Wiltshire	Anglican Church	c. 1687	18 February 1958	SU1805535357; 51°07′02″N 1°44′36″W	1184486	Church of St Mary the Virgin More images
Church of St Katherine and St Peter	Winterbourne Bassett	Anglican Church	14th century	27 February 1958	SU1013874908; 51°28′23″N 1°51′20″W	1284298	Church of St Katherine and St Peter More images
Heale House	Heale House, Woodford	House	1571	10 January 1953	SU1285736405; 51°07′36″N 1°49′04″W	1183383	Heale House More images
Church of St Margaret of Antioch	Yatton Keynell	Anglican Church	19th century	20 December 1960	ST8661976361; 51°29′10″N 2°11′39″W	1356103	Church of St Margaret of Antioch More images
Zeals House	Lower Zeals, Zeals	Country House	Late 14th century	9 September 1987	ST7963431908; 51°05′10″N 2°17′32″W	1318497	Zeals House More images

== See also ==
- Category:Grade I listed buildings in Wiltshire
- List of Grade I listed buildings in Salisbury
- Grade II* listed buildings in Wiltshire
