= Listed buildings in Warminster =

Buildings in Warminster, Wiltshire, England

Warminster is a town and civil parish in Wiltshire, England. It contains 219 listed buildings that are recorded in the National Heritage List for England. Of these one are grade I, eleven are grade II* and 207 are grade II.

This list is based on the information retrieved online from Historic England.

== Key ==
Grade	Criteria
I	Buildings that are of exceptional interest
II*	Particularly important buildings of more than special interest
II	Buildings that are of special interest

== Listing ==
Name	Grade	Location	Type	Completed (Note: The date given is the date used by Historic England as significant for the initial building or that of an important part in the structure's description.)	Date designated	Grid ref. (Note: The grid reference is based on the British national grid reference system, sometimes known as OSGB36, used by the Ordnance Survey.) Geo-coordinates	Notes	Entry number (Note: The "List Entry Number" is a unique number assigned to each listed building and scheduled monument by Historic England.)	Image	Wikidata
Warminster War Memorial	II		war memorial		20 March 2017	ST8738745326; 51°12′25″N 2°10′55″W		1444659	Warminster War Memorial More images	Q66478654
1, Ash Walk	II	1, Ash Walk			28 April 1952	ST8709045152; 51°12′20″N 2°11′10″W		1036173	Upload Photo	Q26287777
3, Ash Walk	II	3, Ash Walk			31 March 1978	ST8709645160; 51°12′20″N 2°11′10″W		1036174	Upload Photo	Q26287778
5, Ash Walk	II	5, Ash Walk			31 March 1978	ST8708845181; 51°12′20″N 2°11′10″W		1036175	Upload Photo	Q26287780
The Bell and Crown Public House	II	66, Bell Hill			31 March 1978	ST8684844240; 51°11′50″N 2°11′23″W		1036200	Upload Photo	Q26287808
Bridge Over River Wylye to North of Boreham Mill	II	Bishopstrow Road			31 March 1978	ST8910844199; 51°11′49″N 2°09′26″W		1036176	Upload Photo	Q26287781
22, Boreham Road	II	22, Boreham Road			31 March 1978	ST8794844756; 51°12′07″N 2°10′26″W		1036182	Upload Photo	Q26287788
Number 24 Torwood and Numbers 26-34	II	24, 26-34, Boreham Road			31 March 1978	ST8798144732; 51°12′06″N 2°10′24″W		1364456	Upload Photo	Q26646229
27, Boreham Road	II	27, Boreham Road			31 March 1978	ST8803944739; 51°12′06″N 2°10′21″W		1364453	Upload Photo	Q26646226
33, Boreham Road	II	33, Boreham Road			31 March 1978	ST8806044726; 51°12′06″N 2°10′20″W		1036179	Upload Photo	Q26287784
35 and 37, Boreham Road	II	35 and 37, Boreham Road			28 April 1952	ST8806544727; 51°12′06″N 2°10′20″W		1364454	Upload Photo	Q26646227
36, Boreham Road	II	36, Boreham Road			31 March 1978	ST8799444729; 51°12′06″N 2°10′24″W		1193598	Upload Photo	Q26488251
No 44 Including Coach House	II	44, Boreham Road			31 March 1978	ST8802444708; 51°12′05″N 2°10′22″W		1036183	Upload Photo	Q26287789
Teify House	II	50, Boreham Road			31 March 1978	ST8807544679; 51°12′04″N 2°10′19″W		1193609	Upload Photo	Q26488260
85 and 87, Boreham Road	II	85 and 87, Boreham Road			31 March 1978	ST8836944628; 51°12′03″N 2°10′04″W		1036180	Upload Photo	Q26287785
95 Boreham Road Part of St John's Church of England Primary School	II	95 Boreham Road Part Of St John's Church Of England Primary School, 95, Boreham Road			31 March 1978	ST8841744583; 51°12′01″N 2°10′02″W		1193541	Upload Photo	Q26488198
Chatley	II	138, Boreham Road			31 March 1978	ST8876144371; 51°11′54″N 2°09′44″W		1193618	Upload Photo	Q26488267
The Cotes	II	207, Boreham Road, BA12 9HF			31 March 1978	ST8930644209; 51°11′49″N 2°09′16″W		1364455	Upload Photo	Q26646228
57-61, Boreham Road (see Details for Further Address Information)	II	55a, Boreham Road			31 March 1978	ST8830344636; 51°12′03″N 2°10′08″W		1193531	Upload Photo	Q26488187
Church of St John the Evangelist	II*	Boreham Road	church building		31 March 1978	ST8848444601; 51°12′02″N 2°09′58″W		1193567	Church of St John the Evangelist More images	Q17543544
Gates and Railings with Dwarf Wall and Piers at Non Conformist Burial Ground	II	Boreham Road			31 March 1978	ST8802044740; 51°12′06″N 2°10′22″W		1036178	Upload Photo	Q26287783
Holly Lodge	II	Boreham Road			31 March 1978	ST8828844605; 51°12′02″N 2°10′08″W		1036184	Upload Photo	Q26287790
Lychgate to Church of St John	II	Boreham Road			31 March 1978	ST8842444578; 51°12′01″N 2°10′01″W		1036181	Upload Photo	Q26287787
Milestone About 70 Yards from Turning to Boreham	II	Boreham Road			31 March 1978	ST8902644264; 51°11′51″N 2°09′30″W		1364457	Upload Photo	Q26646230
Mortuary Chapel at Non Conformist Burial Ground	II	Boreham Road			31 March 1978	ST8802244745; 51°12′06″N 2°10′22″W		1364452	Upload Photo	Q26646225
Stable Building to East of No 207	II	Boreham Road			31 March 1978	ST8933444197; 51°11′49″N 2°09′14″W		1286102	Upload Photo	Q26574738
19 and 20, Cannon Green	II	19 and 20, Cannon Green			31 March 1978	ST8673644287; 51°11′52″N 2°11′28″W		1036185	Upload Photo	Q26287791
22 and 24, Chapel Street	II	22 and 24, Chapel Street			31 March 1978	ST8672644286; 51°11′51″N 2°11′29″W		1193632	Upload Photo	Q26488280
27, Chapel Street	II	27, Chapel Street			31 March 1978	ST8671044298; 51°11′52″N 2°11′30″W		1364458	Upload Photo	Q26646231
Obelisk House	II	1, Church Street			28 April 1952	ST8692345166; 51°12′20″N 2°11′19″W		1193636	Upload Photo	Q26488283
St Denys Lodge	II	2, Church Street			31 March 1978	ST8691345171; 51°12′20″N 2°11′19″W		1364459	Upload Photo	Q26646232
Ivy House	II	3, Church Street			28 April 1952	ST8690045180; 51°12′20″N 2°11′20″W		1193644	Upload Photo	Q26488291
West Down	II	4, Church Street			28 April 1952	ST8688245201; 51°12′21″N 2°11′21″W		1193659	Upload Photo	Q26488306
13 and 14, Church Street	II	13 and 14, Church Street			31 March 1978	ST8690745348; 51°12′26″N 2°11′20″W		1286064	Upload Photo	Q26574703
22, Church Street	II	22, Church Street			31 March 1978	ST8693445451; 51°12′29″N 2°11′18″W		1193674	Upload Photo	Q26488320
23-25, Church Street	II	23-25, Church Street			31 March 1978	ST8693945440; 51°12′29″N 2°11′18″W		1036189	Upload Photo	Q26287795
26, Church Street	II	26, Church Street			31 March 1978	ST8696445434; 51°12′29″N 2°11′17″W		1364461	Upload Photo	Q26646233
Warminster School	II*	28, Church Street	school		28 April 1952	ST8695345367; 51°12′26″N 2°11′17″W		1193680	Warminster School More images	Q7969638
29 and 30, Church Street	II	29 and 30, Church Street			31 March 1978	ST8692245331; 51°12′25″N 2°11′19″W		1364462	Upload Photo	Q26646234
Byne House	II*	40, Church Street			28 April 1952	ST8690945257; 51°12′23″N 2°11′20″W		1286013	Upload Photo	Q17546159
Conifer Cottage and Winfrid Lodge	II	43 and 44, Church Street			31 March 1978	ST8692545192; 51°12′21″N 2°11′19″W		1036193	Upload Photo	Q26287800
St Bede's	II	45, Church Street			31 March 1978	ST8693345185; 51°12′21″N 2°11′18″W		1286018	Upload Photo	Q26574660
46, Church Street	II	46, Church Street			31 March 1978	ST8693845178; 51°12′20″N 2°11′18″W		1036194	Upload Photo	Q26287801
Teddington House	II	47, Church Street			28 April 1952	ST8695645162; 51°12′20″N 2°11′17″W		1036195	Upload Photo	Q26287802
Fives Court at Warminster School	II	Church Street			31 March 1978	ST8696545413; 51°12′28″N 2°11′17″W		1036190	Upload Photo	Q26287797
Former Coach House to South of Warminster School	II	Church Street			31 March 1978	ST8693345345; 51°12′26″N 2°11′18″W		1193698	Upload Photo	Q26488343
Milestone to North of No 42	II	Church Street			31 March 1978	ST8689645220; 51°12′22″N 2°11′20″W		1036192	Upload Photo	Q26287799
Parish Church of St Denys (the Minster Church)	II*	Church Street	church building		28 April 1952	ST8692445494; 51°12′31″N 2°11′19″W		1364460	Parish Church of St Denys (the Minster Church) More images	Q17546619
Railings in Front of Byne House	II	Church Street			31 March 1978	ST8689945262; 51°12′23″N 2°11′20″W		1036191	Upload Photo	Q26287798
St Boniface College at Warminster School	II	Church Street			31 March 1978	ST8688745276; 51°12′24″N 2°11′21″W		1036188	Upload Photo	Q26287794
Stable Block to North of Byne House	II	Church Street			28 April 1952	ST8690845280; 51°12′24″N 2°11′20″W		1286016	Upload Photo	Q26574658
Stables to No 3	II	Church Street			28 April 1952	ST8689345195; 51°12′21″N 2°11′20″W		1036187	Upload Photo	Q26287793
The Round House (in Garage to South East of Obelisk House)	II	Church Street			28 April 1952	ST8693045145; 51°12′19″N 2°11′18″W		1036186	Upload Photo	Q26287792
Butler's Combe Farmhouse	II	Deverill Road			31 March 1978	ST8698043590; 51°11′29″N 2°11′16″W		1364463	Upload Photo	Q26646235
Christ Church	II	Deverill Road	church building		28 April 1952	ST8707344548; 51°12′00″N 2°11′11″W		1036199	Christ Church More images	Q5108725
6 and 8, East Street	II	6 and 8, East Street			31 March 1978	ST8763744995; 51°12′15″N 2°10′42″W		1193821	Upload Photo	Q26488463
10, East Street	II	10, East Street			31 March 1978	ST8764444984; 51°12′14″N 2°10′42″W		1036203	Upload Photo	Q26287811
7 and 9, East Street (see Details for Further Address Information)	II	11 and 13, East Street			31 March 1978	ST8767644996; 51°12′15″N 2°10′40″W		1364464	Upload Photo	Q26646236
14-30, East Street	II	14-30, East Street			28 April 1952	ST8765444986; 51°12′14″N 2°10′41″W		1364466	Upload Photo	Q26646238
32, East Street	II	32, East Street			31 March 1978	ST8766644976; 51°12′14″N 2°10′41″W		1193838	Upload Photo	Q26488482
Masons Arms Inn	II	34, East Street			31 March 1978	ST8767144971; 51°12′14″N 2°10′40″W		1036204	Upload Photo	Q26287812
Entrance Screen to No 45 (yard House)	II	45, East Street			31 March 1978	ST8770844964; 51°12′14″N 2°10′38″W		1036201	Upload Photo	Q26287809
Preston House	II	51, East Street			31 March 1978	ST8778544930; 51°12′12″N 2°10′34″W		1193794	Upload Photo	Q26488440
63 and 65, East Street (see Details for Further Address Information)	II	63 and 65, East Street			31 March 1978	ST8783744889; 51°12′11″N 2°10′32″W		1364465	Upload Photo	Q26646237
Eastway	II	71, East Street			31 March 1978	ST8785044869; 51°12′10″N 2°10′31″W		1285972	Upload Photo	Q26574618
Ivy Lodge	II	73, East Street			31 March 1978	ST8784844852; 51°12′10″N 2°10′31″W		1036202	Upload Photo	Q26287810
Milestone	II	Elm Hill			31 March 1978	ST8824446155; 51°12′52″N 2°10′11″W		1193887	Upload Photo	Q26488528
Emwell House	II	7, Emwell Street			28 April 1952	ST8701245047; 51°12′16″N 2°11′14″W		1364467	Upload Photo	Q26646239
The Weymouth Arms Inn	II	12, Emwell Street	inn		28 April 1952	ST8700245053; 51°12′16″N 2°11′15″W		1285971	The Weymouth Arms Inn More images	Q26574617
Flora Cottage	II	26, Emwell Street			31 March 1978	ST8699945085; 51°12′17″N 2°11′15″W		1036205	Upload Photo	Q26287813
1 and 2, George Street	II	1 and 2, George Street			31 March 1978	ST8725145160; 51°12′20″N 2°11′02″W		1193903	Upload Photo	Q26488544
3, George Street	II	3, George Street			31 March 1978	ST8724545160; 51°12′20″N 2°11′02″W		1036206	Upload Photo	Q26287814
4 and 5, George Street	II	4 and 5, George Street			31 March 1978	ST8723345157; 51°12′20″N 2°11′03″W		1193912	Upload Photo	Q26488553
6, George Street	II	6, George Street			31 March 1978	ST8722045150; 51°12′19″N 2°11′04″W		1364428	Upload Photo	Q26646202
7, George Street	II	7, George Street			31 March 1978	ST8720845149; 51°12′19″N 2°11′04″W		1036207	Upload Photo	Q26287815
8, George Street	II	8, George Street			31 March 1978	ST8720145145; 51°12′19″N 2°11′05″W		1285941	Upload Photo	Q26574593
9 and 10, George Street	II	9 and 10, George Street			31 March 1978	ST8719345144; 51°12′19″N 2°11′05″W		1364429	Upload Photo	Q26646203
14-16, George Street	II	14-16, George Street			31 March 1978	ST8716745132; 51°12′19″N 2°11′06″W		1193923	Upload Photo	Q26488562
The White Hart Inn	II	18, George Street			31 March 1978	ST8714245119; 51°12′18″N 2°11′08″W		1036208	Upload Photo	Q26287816
25-36, George Street	II	25-36, George Street			31 March 1978	ST8719845176; 51°12′20″N 2°11′05″W		1193928	Upload Photo	Q26488568
39 and 40, George Street	II	39 and 40, George Street			31 March 1978	ST8723745188; 51°12′21″N 2°11′03″W		1364430	Upload Photo	Q26646204
15 and 17, Grange Lane	II	15 and 17, Grange Lane			31 March 1978	ST8932744423; 51°11′56″N 2°09′15″W		1285912	Upload Photo	Q26574568
Pavilion to East of Grange Farmhouse	II	Grange Lane			31 March 1978	ST8937844377; 51°11′55″N 2°09′12″W		1036209	Upload Photo	Q26287817
2, High Street	II	2, High Street			31 March 1978	ST8740345121; 51°12′19″N 2°10′54″W		1194006	Upload Photo	Q26488643
3, High Street	II	3, High Street			31 March 1978	ST8736745086; 51°12′17″N 2°10′56″W		1036210	Upload Photo	Q26287818
4, High Street	II	4, High Street			31 March 1978	ST8739645122; 51°12′19″N 2°10′54″W		1036212	Upload Photo	Q26287821
5-17, High Street	II	5-17, High Street			28 April 1952	ST8735445095; 51°12′18″N 2°10′57″W		1193960	Upload Photo	Q26488598
10 and 12, High Street	II	10 and 12, High Street			31 March 1978	ST8737945124; 51°12′19″N 2°10′55″W		1036213	Upload Photo	Q26287822
14-18, High Street	II	14-18, High Street			31 March 1978	ST8737145128; 51°12′19″N 2°10′56″W		1194032	Upload Photo	Q26488667
21-29, High Street	II	21-29, High Street			28 April 1952	ST8734245100; 51°12′18″N 2°10′57″W		1364431	Upload Photo	Q26646205
24 and 26, High Street	II	24 and 26, High Street			31 March 1978	ST8734245133; 51°12′19″N 2°10′57″W		1194043	Upload Photo	Q26488678
28, High Street	II	28, High Street			28 April 1952	ST8733245142; 51°12′19″N 2°10′58″W		1036214	Upload Photo	Q26287823
30, High Street	II	30, High Street			28 April 1952	ST8732645144; 51°12′19″N 2°10′58″W		1036215	Upload Photo	Q26287824
32, High Street	II	32, High Street			28 April 1952	ST8732345147; 51°12′19″N 2°10′58″W		1036216	Upload Photo	Q26287825
The Chantry	II*	34, High Street	architectural structure		28 April 1952	ST8731945154; 51°12′20″N 2°10′58″W		1036217	The Chantry More images	Q17540142
37, High Street	II	37, High Street			31 March 1978	ST8730945126; 51°12′19″N 2°10′59″W		1036211	Upload Photo	Q26287820
Building Incorporated in Nos 41 and 43	II	41 and 43, High Street			31 March 1978	ST8728345147; 51°12′19″N 2°11′00″W		1193999	Upload Photo	Q26488637
49 and 51, High Street	II	49 and 51, High Street			31 March 1978	ST8726845155; 51°12′20″N 2°11′01″W		1364432	Upload Photo	Q26646206
50 and 52, High Street	II	50 and 52, High Street			31 March 1978	ST8727245178; 51°12′20″N 2°11′01″W		1036218	Upload Photo	Q26287826
Chapel of St Lawrence	II	High Street	chapel		28 April 1952	ST8738545082; 51°12′17″N 2°10′55″W		1193945	Chapel of St Lawrence More images	Q26488584
The Athenaeum	II	High Street			31 March 1978	ST8736045147; 51°12′19″N 2°10′56″W		1364433	Upload Photo	Q7969633
Milestone	II	Imber Road			31 March 1978	ST8855645626; 51°12′35″N 2°09′55″W		1036219	Upload Photo	Q26287827
Manor House	II	Manor Gardens			31 March 1978	ST8711945378; 51°12′27″N 2°11′09″W		1036220	Upload Photo	Q26287829
1-5, Market Place	II	1-5, Market Place			31 March 1978	ST8741945114; 51°12′18″N 2°10′53″W		1036221	Upload Photo	Q26287830
Town Hall	II	6, Market Place	city hall		31 March 1978	ST8741845077; 51°12′17″N 2°10′53″W		1364438	Town Hall More images	Q26646212
8-12, Market Place	II	8-12, Market Place			31 March 1978	ST8745345077; 51°12′17″N 2°10′52″W		1194278	Upload Photo	Q26488905
Nos 14 and 20 Together with Range of Buildings at Rear to South (former Stables and Maltings)	II	14 and 20, Market Place			31 March 1978	ST8746645074; 51°12′17″N 2°10′51″W		1036227	Upload Photo	Q26287837
15 and 17, Market Place	II	15 and 17, Market Place			31 March 1978	ST8744745111; 51°12′18″N 2°10′52″W		1364434	Upload Photo	Q26646208
19, Market Place	II	19, Market Place			28 April 1952	ST8745245109; 51°12′18″N 2°10′52″W		1036222	Upload Photo	Q26287831
21 and 21a, Market Place	II	21 and 21a, Market Place			31 March 1978	ST8745945104; 51°12′18″N 2°10′51″W		1036223	Upload Photo	Q26287832
Numbers 22 and 24 Together with Numbers 16 and 18 and Malthouse at Rear	II	22 and 24, 16 and 18, Market Place			31 March 1978	ST8748245055; 51°12′16″N 2°10′50″W		1285772	Upload Photo	Q26574436
Barclays Bank	II	32 and 34, Market Place			31 March 1978	ST8750845051; 51°12′16″N 2°10′49″W		1364439	Upload Photo	Q26646213
36, Market Place	II	36, Market Place			31 March 1978	ST8751845044; 51°12′16″N 2°10′48″W		1194338	Upload Photo	Q26488965
37, Market Place	II	37, Market Place			31 March 1978	ST8749345098; 51°12′18″N 2°10′49″W		1364435	Upload Photo	Q26646209
38 40, Market Place	II*	38 40, Market Place			28 April 1952	ST8752345040; 51°12′16″N 2°10′48″W		1036228	Upload Photo	Q17542548
The Bath Arms Hotel	II	41 and 43, Market Place	hotel		28 April 1952	ST8751445084; 51°12′17″N 2°10′48″W		1194152	The Bath Arms Hotel More images	Q26488783
The Old Bell Public House	II	42, Market Place	pub		28 April 1952	ST8754145032; 51°12′16″N 2°10′47″W		1036229	The Old Bell Public House More images	Q26287838
44-54, Market Place	II	44-54, Market Place			28 April 1952	ST8757445026; 51°12′16″N 2°10′45″W		1194357	Upload Photo	Q26488984
45, Market Place	II	45, Market Place			31 March 1978	ST8754445076; 51°12′17″N 2°10′47″W		1036224	Upload Photo	Q26287834
The Anchor Public House	II	47, Market Place	pub		31 March 1978	ST8755145073; 51°12′17″N 2°10′46″W		1364436	The Anchor Public House More images	Q26646210
Payne's	II	49, Market Place			31 March 1978	ST8756345069; 51°12′17″N 2°10′46″W		1285817	Upload Photo	Q26574479
51 and 53, Market Place	II	51 and 53, Market Place			31 March 1978	ST8757145064; 51°12′17″N 2°10′45″W		1036225	Upload Photo	Q26287835
55-59, Market Place	II	55-59, Market Place			28 April 1952	ST8758645070; 51°12′17″N 2°10′45″W		1194192	Upload Photo	Q26488823
56, Market Place	II	56, Market Place			31 March 1978	ST8756445021; 51°12′15″N 2°10′46″W		1364440	Upload Photo	Q26646214
60, Market Place	II	60, Market Place			31 March 1978	ST8754544975; 51°12′14″N 2°10′47″W		1194370	Upload Photo	Q26488996
70a, Market Place (see Details for Further Address Information)	II	62-70, Market Place			31 March 1978	ST8759145020; 51°12′15″N 2°10′44″W		1036230	Upload Photo	Q26287839
63-67, Market Place	II	63-67, Market Place			31 March 1978	ST8760545064; 51°12′17″N 2°10′44″W		1285794	Upload Photo	Q26574458
69, Market Place	II	69, Market Place			31 March 1978	ST8761945052; 51°12′16″N 2°10′43″W		1036226	Upload Photo	Q26287836
71, Market Place	II	71, Market Place			31 March 1978	ST8764845038; 51°12′16″N 2°10′41″W		1364437	Upload Photo	Q26646211
72 and 74, Market Place	II	72 and 74, Market Place			31 March 1978	ST8759945016; 51°12′15″N 2°10′44″W		1285720	Upload Photo	Q26574389
76, Market Place	II	76, Market Place			31 March 1978	ST8760345005; 51°12′15″N 2°10′44″W		1364441	Upload Photo	Q26646215
National Westminster Bank	II	78 and 80, Market Place			31 March 1978	ST8761145008; 51°12′15″N 2°10′43″W		1194399	Upload Photo	Q26489024
5 and 6, Marsh Street	II	5 and 6, Marsh Street			31 March 1978	ST8696344224; 51°11′49″N 2°11′17″W		1036231	Upload Photo	Q26287841
6 and 8, High Street (see Details for Further Address Information)	II	2, North Row			31 March 1978	ST8738645121; 51°12′19″N 2°10′55″W		1285907	Upload Photo	Q26574564
Osborne Cottage	II	4, North Row			31 March 1978	ST8743545197; 51°12′21″N 2°10′52″W		1194404	Upload Photo	Q26489028
30-33, North Row	II	30-33, North Row			31 March 1978	ST8744745179; 51°12′20″N 2°10′52″W		1036232	Upload Photo	Q26287842
Baptist Church	II	North Row			27 August 1998	ST8743845242; 51°12′22″N 2°10′52″W		1376197	Upload Photo	Q26656826
Church Hall Immediately South East of Baptist Church	II	North Row			27 August 1998	ST8745045225; 51°12′22″N 2°10′52″W		1376198	Upload Photo	Q26656827
Former Girls' British School	II	North Row			31 March 1978	ST8743845161; 51°12′20″N 2°10′52″W		1194413	Upload Photo	Q26489038
54, High Street (see Details for Further Address Information)	II	2-6, Portway			31 March 1978	ST8727545192; 51°12′21″N 2°11′01″W		1364444	Upload Photo	Q26646217
30, Portway	II	30, Portway			31 March 1978	ST8733645218; 51°12′22″N 2°10′58″W		1036235	Upload Photo	Q26287845
Portway House	I	31 and 33, Portway	building		28 April 1952	ST8735445364; 51°12′26″N 2°10′57″W		1364442	Portway House More images	Q17530094
32-36, Portway	II	32-36, Portway			31 March 1978	ST8732345257; 51°12′23″N 2°10′58″W		1036236	Upload Photo	Q26287846
37-43, Portway	II	37-43, Portway			31 March 1978	ST8742045463; 51°12′30″N 2°10′53″W		1194483	Upload Photo	Q26489107
38, Portway	II	38, Portway			31 March 1978	ST8733745265; 51°12′23″N 2°10′58″W		1036237	Upload Photo	Q26287847
40 and 42, Portway	II	40 and 42, Portway			28 April 1952	ST8734445272; 51°12′23″N 2°10′57″W		1036238	Upload Photo	Q26287848
The Ferns	II	61, Portway			31 March 1978	ST8748345537; 51°12′32″N 2°10′50″W		1364443	Upload Photo	Q26646216
66-74, Portway	II	66-74, Portway			31 March 1978	ST8742445409; 51°12′28″N 2°10′53″W		1036239	Upload Photo	Q26287849
83-89, Portway	II	83-89, Portway			31 March 1978	ST8755545611; 51°12′34″N 2°10′46″W		1036234	Upload Photo	Q26287844
Pavilion to North East of Portway House. Two Attached Walls to South and West	II	Portway			28 April 1952	ST8738845389; 51°12′27″N 2°10′55″W		1036233	Upload Photo	Q26287843
Screen to Road in Front of Portway House	II*	Portway			26 May 1954	ST8737745360; 51°12′26″N 2°10′55″W		1285678	Upload Photo	Q17546145
24 and 26, Pound Street	II	24 and 26, Pound Street			28 April 1952	ST8662244879; 51°12′11″N 2°11′34″W		1036241	Upload Photo	Q26287851
Pound Street Malthouse	II*	39, Pound Street			28 April 1952	ST8665944907; 51°12′12″N 2°11′32″W		1036240	Upload Photo	Q17542562
4, Sambourne Road	II	4, Sambourne Road			31 March 1978	ST8707545069; 51°12′17″N 2°11′11″W		1364446	Upload Photo	Q26646219
Sambourne House	II	8, Sambourne Road			31 March 1978	ST8703544934; 51°12′12″N 2°11′13″W		1194525	Upload Photo	Q26489147
10, Sambourne Road	II	10, Sambourne Road			31 March 1978	ST8701844914; 51°12′12″N 2°11′14″W		1036242	Upload Photo	Q26287852
Former Workhouse Building at 54 Sambourne Road (sambourne Hospital)	II	54, Sambourne Road			31 March 1978	ST8686444590; 51°12′01″N 2°11′22″W		1364445	Upload Photo	Q26646218
The Farmers' Hotel	II	1, Silver Street	hotel		31 March 1978	ST8711445122; 51°12′19″N 2°11′09″W		1285634	The Farmers' Hotel More images	Q26574311
2, Silver Street	II	2, Silver Street			31 March 1978	ST8710145125; 51°12′19″N 2°11′10″W		1036243	Upload Photo	Q26287854
4 and 5, Silver Street	II	4 and 5, Silver Street			31 March 1978	ST8707845124; 51°12′19″N 2°11′11″W		1364447	Upload Photo	Q26646220
7 and 8, Silver Street	II	7 and 8, Silver Street			31 March 1978	ST8706845121; 51°12′19″N 2°11′11″W		1194551	Upload Photo	Q26489173
10 and 11, Silver Street	II	10 and 11, Silver Street			31 March 1978	ST8704745124; 51°12′19″N 2°11′12″W		1036244	Upload Photo	Q26287855
12 and 13, Silver Street	II	12 and 13, Silver Street			31 March 1978	ST8702145122; 51°12′19″N 2°11′14″W		1285643	Upload Photo	Q26574318
Laurel Dene	II	14a and 15, Silver Street			31 March 1978	ST8700845102; 51°12′18″N 2°11′14″W		1364408	Upload Photo	Q26646183
Post Office	II	16, Silver Street			31 March 1978	ST8699345111; 51°12′18″N 2°11′15″W		1285648	Upload Photo	Q26574323
Bevington and Craven House with Wrought Iron Screen to Street	II*	17, Silver Street, BA12 8PS	architectural structure		28 April 1952	ST8696945108; 51°12′18″N 2°11′16″W		1036246	Bevington and Craven House with Wrought Iron Screen to Street More images	Q17542577
33, Silver Street	II	33, Silver Street			31 March 1978	ST8698845148; 51°12′19″N 2°11′15″W		1364409	Upload Photo	Q26646184
The Haven	II	34, Silver Street			28 April 1952	ST8700145146; 51°12′19″N 2°11′15″W		1036247	Upload Photo	Q26287859
35-38, Silver Street	II	35-38, Silver Street			28 April 1952	ST8700845146; 51°12′19″N 2°11′14″W		1194578	Upload Photo	Q26489198
The Cedars	II	39, Silver Street			28 April 1952	ST8702845152; 51°12′20″N 2°11′13″W		1036248	Upload Photo	Q26287860
44, Silver Street	II	44, Silver Street			31 March 1978	ST8704345147; 51°12′19″N 2°11′13″W		1194590	Upload Photo	Q26489211
45, Silver Street	II	45, Silver Street			31 March 1978	ST8705445148; 51°12′19″N 2°11′12″W		1364410	Upload Photo	Q26646185
46-48, Silver Street	II	46-48, Silver Street			31 March 1978	ST8706445149; 51°12′19″N 2°11′12″W		1194595	Upload Photo	Q26489214
49, Silver Street	II	49, Silver Street			31 March 1978	ST8708245147; 51°12′19″N 2°11′11″W		1036249	Upload Photo	Q26287862
50, Silver Street	II	50, Silver Street			31 March 1978	ST8708645149; 51°12′19″N 2°11′10″W		1194601	Upload Photo	Q26489219
Little Court	II	Silver Street			31 March 1978	ST8702445110; 51°12′18″N 2°11′14″W		1036245	Upload Photo	Q26287857
The Obelisk	II*	Silver Street	obelisk		28 April 1952	ST8695445133; 51°12′19″N 2°11′17″W		1194575	The Obelisk More images	Q17543569
Turnpike Cottage	II	Smallbrook Road			31 March 1978	ST8772744008; 51°11′43″N 2°10′37″W		1364411	Upload Photo	Q26646186
The Old School House	II	16 South Street, BA12 8DZ			31 March 1978	ST8629244386; 51°11′55″N 2°11′51″W		1036250	Upload Photo	Q26287864
Avenue Cottage	II	8, The Close			31 March 1978	ST8737445289; 51°12′24″N 2°10′56″W		1036196	Upload Photo	Q26287803
Vernham House	II	12, The Close			31 March 1978	ST8738545256; 51°12′23″N 2°10′55″W		1036197	Upload Photo	Q26287804
16, the Close (see Details for Further Address Information)	II	16, The Close			31 March 1978	ST8737745209; 51°12′21″N 2°10′55″W		1036198	Upload Photo	Q26287805
Emwell Cross House	II	1, Vicarage Street			28 April 1952	ST8694845089; 51°12′17″N 2°11′18″W		1194629	Upload Photo	Q26489245
2 and 4, Vicarage Street	II	2 and 4, Vicarage Street			31 March 1978	ST8693645121; 51°12′19″N 2°11′18″W		1194670	Upload Photo	Q26489285
3, Vicarage Street	II	3, Vicarage Street			31 March 1978	ST8694445082; 51°12′17″N 2°11′18″W		1364412	Upload Photo	Q26646187
Durrell House	II	6, Vicarage Street			28 April 1952	ST8692945109; 51°12′18″N 2°11′19″W		1364413	Upload Photo	Q26646188
7 Vicarage Street and the Minster Ce Primary School	II	7, Vicarage Street, BA12 8JG			26 May 1954	ST8692045073; 51°12′17″N 2°11′19″W		1194636	Upload Photo	Q26489252
8, Vicarage Street	II	8, Vicarage Street			31 March 1978	ST8692645102; 51°12′18″N 2°11′19″W		1036253	Upload Photo	Q26287867
10, Vicarage Street	II	10, Vicarage Street			31 March 1978	ST8691645098; 51°12′18″N 2°11′19″W		1194679	Upload Photo	Q26489294
St Monica's School	II	11, Vicarage Street			31 March 1978	ST8686445072; 51°12′17″N 2°11′22″W		1036251	Upload Photo	Q26287865
Golspie House	II	13, Vicarage Street			31 March 1978	ST8682945078; 51°12′17″N 2°11′24″W		1194664	Upload Photo	Q26489279
No 22 (the Old Vicarage) Including Boundary Wall to Street	II	22, Vicarage Street			31 March 1978	ST8681745132; 51°12′19″N 2°11′24″W		1364414	Upload Photo	Q26646189
Nos 23 and 25 Including Boundary Wall to South of No 25	II	23 and 25, Vicarage Street			31 March 1978	ST8679145068; 51°12′17″N 2°11′26″W		1036252	Upload Photo	Q26287866
Vicarage Cottage	II	24, Vicarage Street			31 March 1978	ST8680545100; 51°12′18″N 2°11′25″W		1285585	Upload Photo	Q26574267
Converted Coach House to North East Wren House	II*	32, Vicarage Street			28 April 1952	ST8674445087; 51°12′17″N 2°11′28″W		1036254	Upload Photo	Q17542592
Benrose	II	34, Vicarage Street			31 March 1978	ST8674145074; 51°12′17″N 2°11′28″W		1194688	Upload Photo	Q26489302
46, Vicarage Street	II	46, Vicarage Street			31 March 1978	ST8670945066; 51°12′17″N 2°11′30″W		1036255	Upload Photo	Q26287868
54a, Victoria Road (see Details for Further Address Information)	II	54-58, Victoria Road			31 March 1978	ST8605344921; 51°12′12″N 2°12′04″W		1036258	Upload Photo	Q26287872
64 and 66, Victoria Road	II	64 and 66, Victoria Road			31 March 1978	ST8601844918; 51°12′12″N 2°12′05″W		1036259	Upload Photo	Q26287873
Bugley Barton Farmhouse	II	Victoria Road			31 March 1978	ST8537244770; 51°12′07″N 2°12′39″W		1036256	Upload Photo	Q26287870
Milestone	II	Victoria Road			31 March 1978	ST8449844055; 51°11′44″N 2°13′24″W		1036257	Upload Photo	Q26287871
Westhaven (former Orphanage)	II	6, West Street			31 March 1978	ST8665945031; 51°12′16″N 2°11′32″W		1036263	Upload Photo	Q26287880
St Nicholas	II	8, West Street			28 April 1952	ST8664945028; 51°12′15″N 2°11′33″W		1194720	Upload Photo	Q26489334
Stables of No 12 (west House)	II	12, West Street			28 April 1952	ST8660545008; 51°12′15″N 2°11′35″W		1194722	Upload Photo	Q26489336
West House	II	12, West Street			28 April 1952	ST8662045025; 51°12′15″N 2°11′34″W		1364416	Upload Photo	Q26646191
The Old House	II	14, West Street			28 April 1952	ST8658445006; 51°12′15″N 2°11′36″W		1036264	Upload Photo	Q26287882
25 and 27, West Street	II	25 and 27, West Street			31 March 1978	ST8650244961; 51°12′13″N 2°11′41″W		1036260	Upload Photo	Q26287875
29 and 31, West Street	II	29 and 31, West Street			31 March 1978	ST8648644956; 51°12′13″N 2°11′41″W		1036261	Upload Photo	Q26287877
33 and 35, West Street	II	33 and 35, West Street			31 March 1978	ST8647744954; 51°12′13″N 2°11′42″W		1364415	Upload Photo	Q26646190
44-48, West Street	II	44-48, West Street			31 March 1978	ST8648544979; 51°12′14″N 2°11′41″W		1285542	Upload Photo	Q26574229
Cock Inn	II	55, West Street			31 March 1978	ST8645544952; 51°12′13″N 2°11′43″W		1036262	Upload Photo	Q26287879
90 and 92, West Street	II	90 and 92, West Street			31 March 1978	ST8639044960; 51°12′13″N 2°11′46″W		1364417	Upload Photo	Q26646192
94-100, West Street	II	94-100, West Street			31 March 1978	ST8637744957; 51°12′13″N 2°11′47″W		1036265	Upload Photo	Q26287883
The King's Arms	II	3, Weymouth Street			31 March 1978	ST8744745056; 51°12′16″N 2°10′52″W		1036266	Upload Photo	Q26287884
5, 7 and 9 Weymouth Street	II	5, 7 and 9, Weymouth Street, BA12 9NP			31 March 1978	ST8744045043; 51°12′16″N 2°10′52″W		1194752	Upload Photo	Q26489364
Weymouth House	II	11, Weymouth Street			31 March 1978	ST8743245019; 51°12′15″N 2°10′53″W		1364418	Upload Photo	Q26646193
Building Adjacent to South of No 11	II	Weymouth Street			31 March 1978	ST8742645011; 51°12′15″N 2°10′53″W		1194761	Upload Photo	Q26489373
147 and 149, Woodcock Road	II	147 and 149, Woodcock Road			31 March 1978	ST8913344383; 51°11′55″N 2°09′25″W		1036267	Upload Photo	Q26287886

== See also ==
- Grade I listed buildings in Wiltshire
- Grade II* listed buildings in Wiltshire

== Sources ==
- Orbach, Julian; Pevsner, Nikolaus; Cherry, Bridget (2021), Wiltshire, The Buildings of England, New Haven and London: Yale University Press, ISBN 978-0-300-25120-3
