= West Tisbury =

West Tisbury is the name of two places:

- West Tisbury, Wiltshire, England, a civil parish
- West Tisbury, Massachusetts, United States
