= Snaffles =

British artist

Charles "Snaffles" Johnson Payne (1884–1967) was an English painter known for his humorous work and for his outstanding draughtsmanship and depiction of the horse in action.

== Style and subject matter ==
Snaffles specialised in water colours and drawings sold as prints which, at least initially, were hand-coloured by the artist and his sisters. His subject matter was invariably military, racing or hunting / equestrian scenes (polo, pig sticking), or some combination of these. Many of his most famous pictures contrast or combine military life with the peacetime pursuits of racing and hunting. These include:

- "Pass friend" showing a fox sneaking past a Home Guard sentry;
- "The Season 1939–1940" showing a mounted hunt making its way past an armoured unit on exercise on a narrow road, somewhere in England;
- "Blighty – 'and only five and twenty percent of the danger'" showing a soldier jumping a hazardous fence and ditch out hunting;
- "Once upon a time" showing a couple of soldiers, presumably in the cavalry (there is a light tank behind them), reminiscing about pre-war polo, racing and hunting.

The Grand National features in a number of his pictures, including "The Grand National – the Canal Turn", "A National candidate" and arguably his most famous work: a pair of pictures showing "The finest view in Europe" (picture painted from the perspective of a hunt follower, looking over the ears of his mount, with hounds running and a number of hedges to jump) and "The worst view in Europe" (race horse and jockey are shown approaching a formidable fence in sheeting rain, with a loose horse to the subject's right possibly about to cut him up, and the back end of a further horse which has come to grief over the fence immediately in front of the subject. One assumes that the 'view' in question is that of the jockey – see below. It could conceivably be that of a racegoer / punter who has backed the inept and drunken jockey shown – the perspective shown in the picture is in fact that of the spectator, albeit observing the jockey looking at the fence ahead of him.)

The vast majority of his racing pictures show point-to-pointing (i.e. amateur racing organised by the hunt to raise funds) rather than racing under rules. For example:

- "Oh! To be in England now that April's here!"
- "A bona fide fox hunter"
- "A sight to take home and dream about"
- "Prepare to receive cavalry"

In each of these and many others there is one or more mounted person in hunt dress. The general background (pitched tents, running stream rather than artificial ditches) is indicative of a point-to-point course rather than a permanent racecourse. The title "Oh to be in England now that April's here!" specifically refers to the point-to-point season which in those days would have been at the end of the hunting season, i.e. spring.

His most famous military scenes include a number of studies of different types of soldier fighting in the Great War, e.g. "Anzac" (Australian / NZ soldier), "Jock", "The Gunner", "The Canadian", "The DR" (dispatch rider) etc.

Snaffles had a distinctive drawing style, often showing just one person in detail. In addition, his pictures are often recognisable from the use of (1) the incorporation of one or a number of sketches (often uncoloured) around the principal image (what is sometimes referred to as a remarque), and (2) some additional caption, often amusing, to supplement the picture's title and further explain the scene.

The additional caption beneath the title of "The worst view in Europe" is "Oh Murther! The dhrink died out of me and the wrong side of Bechers." (In the UK, at the time, many jump jockeys were Irish which Snaffles was presumably trying to reference in his spelling of "mother" and "drink". Becher's Brook is a famous fence at Aintree.) There is then a small sketch to the side, presumably depicting the sequel, showing a dismounted horse, its jockey unconscious on the floor. Two men stand by, one holding the horse and the other raising a flag to summon the doctor or warn the stewards that there has been a fall.

In contrast to many hunting artists (Lionel Edwards, Alfred Munnings etc.), a high proportion of Snaffles's work showed individual hunting characters, sometimes inactive, as opposed to a large field sweeping over vale country. Early Snaffles includes a set of four "hunting characters": "Hogany tops", "The gent with horses to sell", "Blood and quality" and "Old tawney". In each case the character depicted is shown more or less immobile with a minimum of scenery. Similarly a later work, "Ansome is wot ansome does" shows a bespectacled hunt follower sitting still on a physically unprepossessing horse ("Ansome is -"), whilst the small sketch in the corner of the print shows the same horse and rider bounding effortlessly across a huge stream ("- wot ansome does").

== Life ==
Snaffles was deemed too young to go to the South African War but in 1902, at the age of 18, he enlisted as a gunner in the Royal Garrison Artillery where, after lights-out, he used to read Kipling to his mates by candlelight in the barrack room. In the following years he developed his artistic skills and was able to leave the Army. By the time the First World War broke out, he was a frequent contributor to periodicals, such as the Sporting and Dramatic, in the days before photography had become general. In the early part of the war, as an artist for The Graphic, he sketched many scenes from the front in France before entering the Royal Naval Air Service as a rating Motor Mechanic in small coastal motorboats. Later he was commissioned as a Lieutenant RNVR, and joined the team under Norman Wilkinson engaged in designing camouflage for ships at sea, which involved trips in the Northern Patrol.

In 1915 he married Lucy Lewin, who was born in Sydney, NSW, the daughter of a West Country owner-skipper of a trading brig whose wife, as was often the custom in those days, accompanied him; the ship happened to be in Sydney at the time. His artistic career continued between the wars, covering the sporting scene in England, Ireland and, particularly, in India. Apart from the sale of his sporting prints, he contributed to many magazines including Punch. He and Lucy lived just outside Guildford from 1925 until early in World War II. He helped with the camouflage of airfields, gasometers etc. and joined the Home Guard. When their house was narrowly missed by a stick of bombs, they moved first to Somerset, then to Devon and eventually to Orcheston in Wiltshire, before buying Orchard Cottage, Hindon Lane, Tisbury, Wiltshire just after the war. His work was part of the painting event in the art competition at the 1932 Summer Olympics.

Snaffles had a studio behind the house and although his most prolific painting days had passed, he still continued to sketch and turned his hand to producing a series of well-received books and also Christmas cards for his friends. He and Lucy were often to be seen on the footpaths around Fonthill with their dogs. Snaffles died in 1967, Lucy in 1980. They are both buried in Fonthill Gifford churchyard.

== Confusion with Snaffle (Robert Dunkin) ==
Payne is not to be confused with Robert Dunkin, who used the pseudonym Snaffle when writing books on shooting large and small game, published between 1894 and 1914.
