= Lady Down Quarry =

Geological Site of Special Scientific Interest in Wiltshire, England

Coordinates: 51.07561°N 2.05705°W

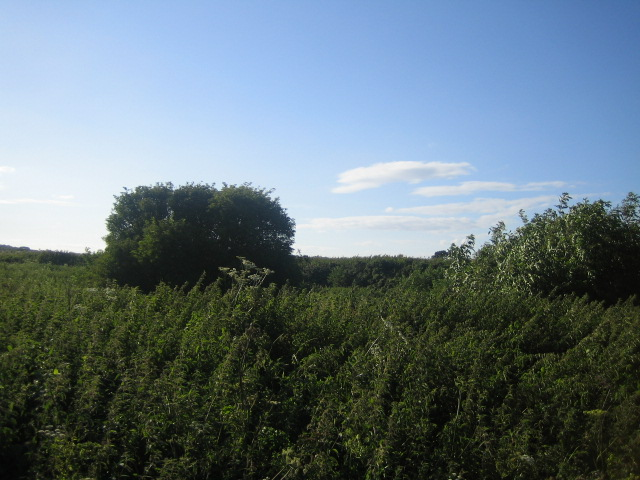
Quarry, Lady Down

Lady Down Quarry (grid reference ST961307) is a 2,300 square metre geological Site of Special Scientific Interest in the northeast of Tisbury parish in Wiltshire, England, notified in 1990.

== Sources ==
- Natural England citation sheet for the site (accessed 7 April 2022)
