= West Tisbury, Wiltshire =

Civil parish in Wiltshire, England

Coordinates: 51.06°N 2.12°W

West Tisbury
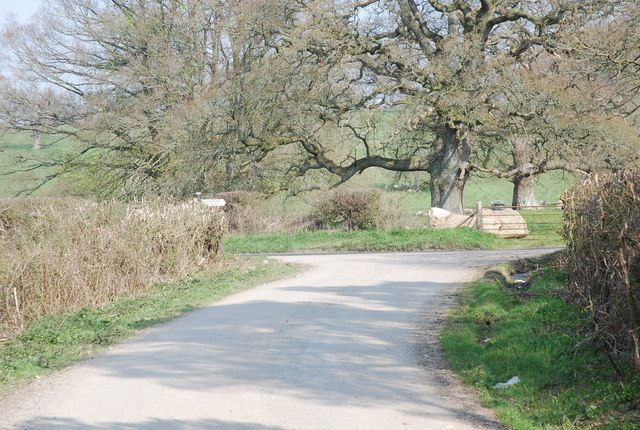
- Junction near Hatch House

- Location within Wiltshire
- Population: 573 (in 2011)
- OS grid reference: ST916290
- Civil parish: West Tisbury
- Unitary authority: Wiltshire
- Ceremonial county: Wiltshire
- Region: South West
- Country: England
- Sovereign state: United Kingdom
- Post town: Salisbury
- Postcode district: SP3
- Dialling code: 01747
- Police: Wiltshire
- Fire: Dorset and Wiltshire
- Ambulance: South Western
- UK Parliament: Salisbury
- Website: Parish Council

West Tisbury is a civil parish in southwest Wiltshire, England. The parish takes in the southwestern quarter of the village of Tisbury and extends about 3.8 miles (6.1 km) westward; Tisbury is about 13 miles (21 km) west of Salisbury.

The settlements in the parish are the following hamlets:

- East Hatch
- Kinghay
- Newtown
- Tuckingmill, immediately west of Tisbury (not to be confused with Tuckingmill, Cornwall or Tucking Mill, Somerset)
- West Hatch (not to be confused with West Hatch civil parish, Somerset)

The River Sem, a tributary of the Nadder, forms almost all of the southern boundary of the parish. The West of England Main Line railway, opened in 1859, follows the same route.

The civil parish elects a parish council. It is in the area of Wiltshire Council unitary authority, which is responsible for all significant local government functions.

== History ==
In the late 16th century, West Hatch appears to have just consisted of a few scattered farms, with there being no discernible village centre as of 1773, as is still the case today. Settlement at that time was denser in East Hatch, with the presence of a now-unknown site of a medieval chapel and, as of the early 19th century, around 34 houses and cottages.

Until 1835 the land now in West Tisbury parish was part of Tisbury parish. In 1986 small areas were transferred from West Tisbury to East Knoyle and Tisbury, the latter comprising housing built in the 1970s.

A school was built at Newtown in 1846 and closed in 1931.

The parish of West Tisbury had a population of 734 in 1841, and then 653 in 1861. This increased to 855 by 1871, since people had moved from East Tisbury following the construction of a new workhouse in the parish. The population declined over time, however, down to 429 by 1971.

== Notable buildings ==
Pythouse, a Grade II* listed country house, was built near Newtown in about 1725 and then rebuilt in 1805 for the politician John Benett. Nearby Hatch House, from the 17th century and altered in 1908 by Detmar Blow, is also Grade II* listed.

St Andrew's church at Newtown was built in 1911 to designs of Edward Doran Webb, using Chilmark stone salvaged from a former church in the grounds of Pythouse. It was a chapel-of-ease of Tisbury until it was declared redundant in 1975, and is now in residential use.

== See also ==
- West Tisbury, Massachusetts
