= Place Farm, Tisbury =

Farm in Tisbury, Wiltshire, England

Place Farm
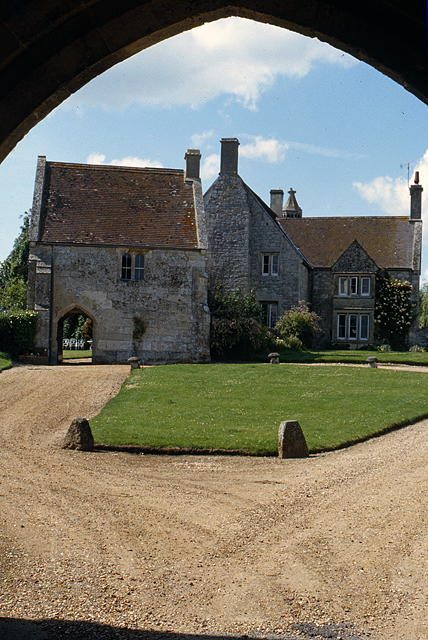
- "One of the finest surviving groups of monastic grange buildings in England"

- Location within Wiltshire
- 51.0678°N 2.0712°W
- Type: Farm
- Location: Tisbury, Wiltshire

History
- Built: 14th century and after

Site notes
- Governing body: Fonthill Estate

Listed Building – Grade I
- Official name: Place Farmhouse
- Designated: 6 January 1966
- Reference no.: 1184177

Listed Building – Grade I
- Official name: Inner gatehouse at Place Farm
- Designated: 6 January 1966
- Reference no.: 1146019

Listed Building – Grade I
- Official name: Outer gatehouse at Place Farm
- Designated: 6 January 1966
- Reference no.: 1300237

Listed Building – Grade I
- Official name: Tithe barn at Place Farm
- Designated: 6 January 1966
- Reference no.: 1318824

Listed Building – Grade II
- Official name: Farm buildings at Place Farm
- Designated: 6 January 1966
- Reference no.: 1146020

Place Farm is a complex of medieval buildings in the village of Tisbury, Wiltshire, England. They originally formed a grange of Shaftesbury Abbey. The farmhouse, the inner and outer gatehouses and the barn, reputedly the largest in England, are all Grade I listed buildings.

== History and description ==
Shaftesbury Abbey was founded by Alfred the Great in 888. The first religious foundation established for women in England, Alfred's daughter, Æthelgifu was installed as abbess. By the Middle Ages, the abbey had become a very wealthy institution, and it established the grange at Place Farm as the administrative centre of its Wiltshire estates. (Note: A popular contemporary saying suggested that Shaftesbury's wealth, and that of the neighboring abbey of Glastonbury, was such that, "If the abbot of Glastonbury could marry the abbess of Shaftesbury their heir would hold more land than the king of England".) Nikolaus Pevsner, in his Wiltshire Pevsner, dates the buildings at Place Farm to the 14th and 15th centuries. Anthony Quiney describes the "magnificent scale" of the complex. The Victoria County History notes that the ancillary features included two chapels, two larder houses, stables, houses for oxen, hay, and charcoal, and a number of fishponds. Margaret Wood, in her history, The Medieval English House, wrote that although the gatehouses are not properly defensive in a military sense, they would provide protection "against bands of marauders or discontented peasantry". At the Dissolution of the Monasteries in 1536 Place Farm passed into private ownership. In the 19th century, the farm became part of the Fonthill estate of the Morrison family, who continue in ownership. The tithe barn is let to Messum's, the art dealers, while other farm buildings are occupied by the charity, International Cat Care.

The farm house at Place Farm is a Grade I listed building. Dating mainly from the 15th century, it was renovated in the 19th. It is constructed of rubble stone, with a tiled roof. A room in the house has a frieze which carries the initials AM, that probably reference the collector Alfred Morrison who owned the estate in the 19th century. The estate buildings which form three sides of a courtyard are listed Grade II. The tithe barn, which at 200 ft long is reputed to be the largest barn in England, has a Grade I listing. The barn was originally tiled, but now has a thatched roof, (Note: Alec Clifton-Taylor, the architectural historian, calculated the roof required 1,450 square yards of thatch. John Julius Norwich noted the "heroical" scale of the effort required to undertake the thatching.) which was renewed in 1971. The barn is thirteen bays long, with a cruck truss roof structure. The inner and outer gatehouses are also listed at Grade I. Historic England considers the complex at Place Farm, "one of the finest surviving groups of monastic grange buildings in England".

== Gallery ==
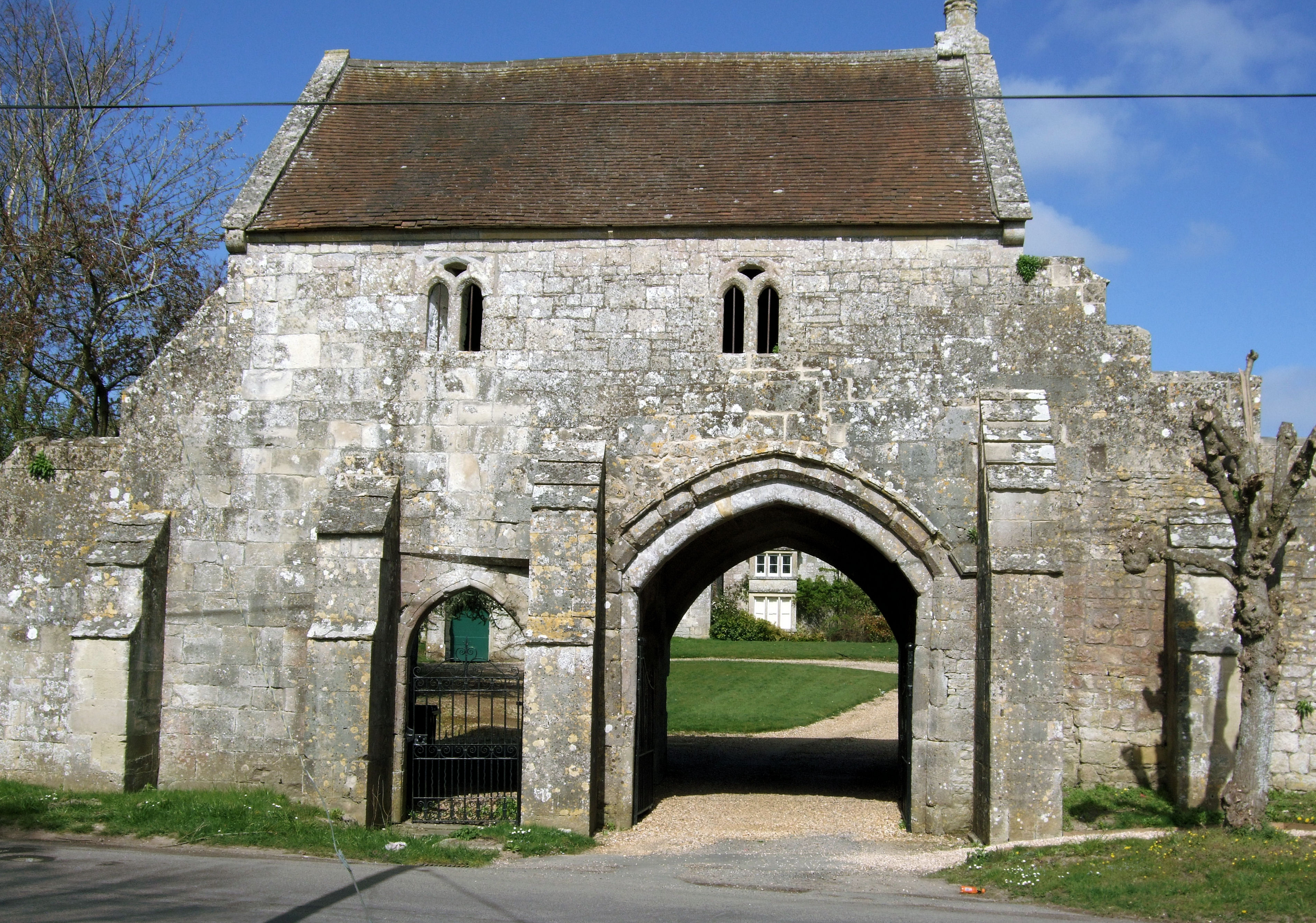
Outer gatehouse

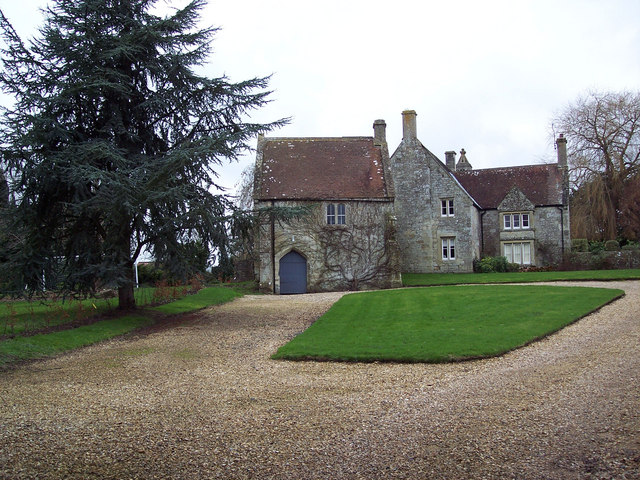
Inner gatehouse, to the left, and farmhouse

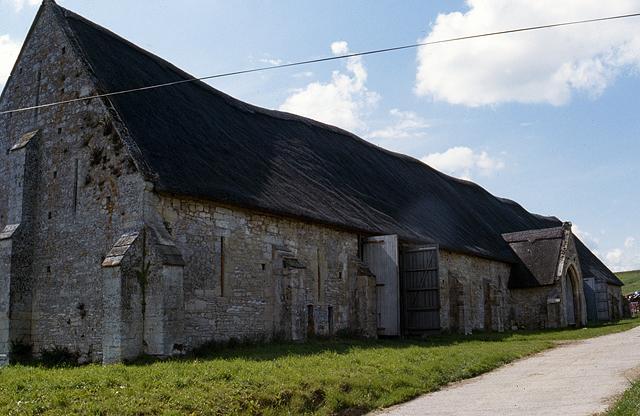
Tithe barn

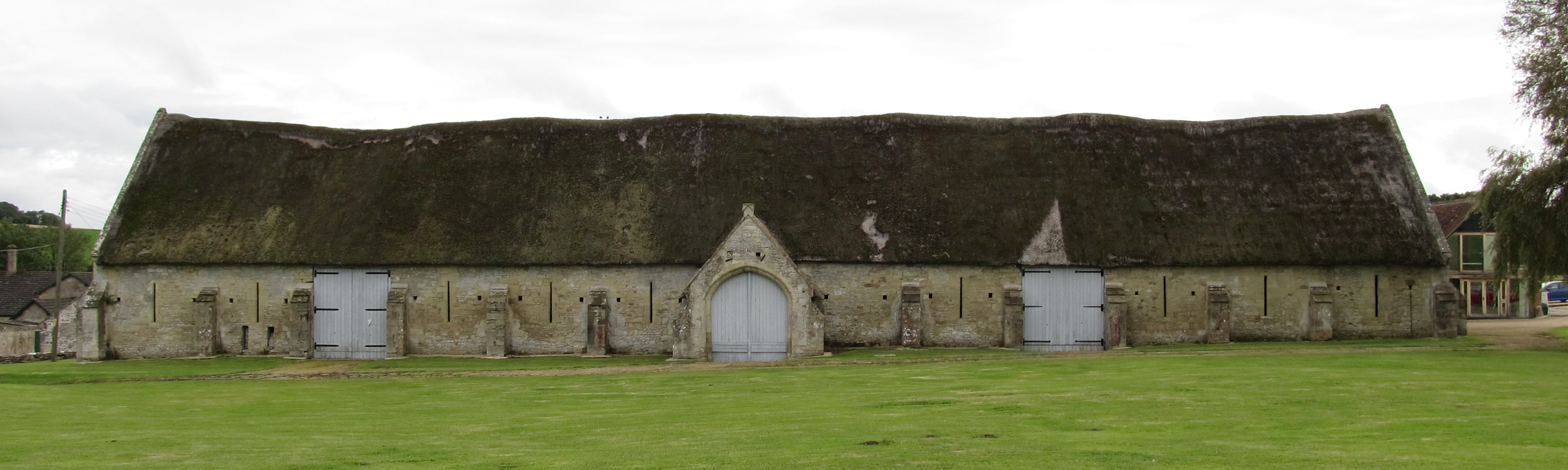
Tithe barn (long view)

== Sources ==
- Norwich, John Julius (1985). The Architecture of Southern England. London: Macmillan. ISBN 978-0-333-22037-5. OCLC 642298108.
- Pevsner, Nikolaus; Cherry, Bridget (2002). Wiltshire. The Buildings Of England. New Haven, US and London: Yale University Press. ISBN 978-0-300-09659-0. OCLC 49298090.
- Quiney, Anthony (1990). The Traditional Buildings of England. London: Thames & Hudson. ISBN 978-0-500-34110-0. OCLC 802622322.
- Wood, Margaret (1994) [1965]. The English Medieval House. London: Studio Editions. ISBN 978-1-858-91167-0. OCLC 246597155.
