= Parade House =

Historic building in Wilrshire, England

Coordinates: 51°19′17″N 2°12′36″W

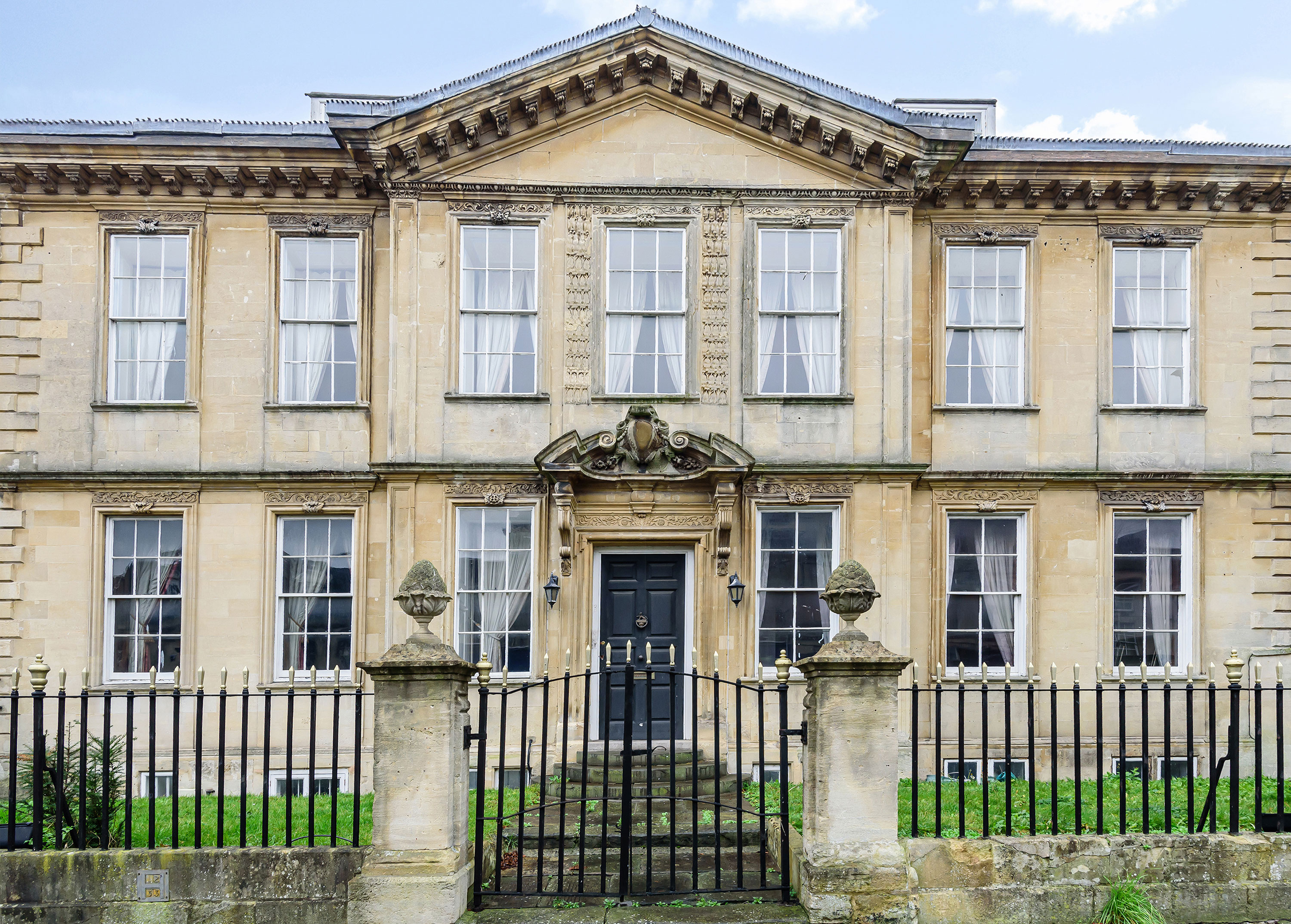
Parade House, 70 Fore Street, Trowbridge

Parade House is a Grade I listed Georgian townhouse in central Trowbridge, Wiltshire, England. It is a centrepiece of what Pevsner's Guide to Wiltshire described in 1960 as "a stretch of palaces" along Fore Street. Built in around 1720 for the wealthy cloth merchant Robert Houlton, Parade House has an elegant and symmetrical façade typical of the Georgian period. It was home to a succession of merchants during the 19th century at a time when Trowbridge was flourishing as a wealthy market town, until becoming the headquarters of Usher's Wiltshire Brewery for most of the 20th century. Today the building is a venue for public and private events.

== History ==
=== Construction ===
Parade House was the creation of Robert Houlton, second son of local cloth merchant Joseph Houlton. Born in 1677, Robert appears to have been a giant of a man. No portraits survive, but there is a note in the register of burials for his death in 1738 that the coffin was "2ft 9ins abreast and 6 ft 5ins long". He married Elizabeth Grant of Bristol in 1704, but both she and their newborn daughter died in childbirth in 1707. He married again in 1711 to Sarah Abraham of Frome Selwood but they had no children, and she died in 1732.

Robert followed his elder half-brother Joseph Houlton II into the family business as a clothier. Though clearly capable and a good administrator – he was named as sole executor of his father's will – he seems to have lacked his brother's entrepreneurial zeal.

Upon the death in 1720 of Joseph I, Robert inherited all his father's property in Trowbridge except the family home at 66–67 Fore Street which went to Joseph II. The inheritance included several properties in Fore Street including, according to a record from 1724, "a bakehouse and a garden late occupied by Ann Stevens, widow" and "a house and garden late occupied by Ann Chivers". "Both [were] taken down and a house where Robert Houlton now lives built on the site thereof". Construction of Parade House probably began soon after Joseph I's death.

At around the same point in time, his nephew Nathaniel Houlton (one of Joseph II's sons) was rebuilding 68 Fore Street in a similarly grand style, while rival clothier John Cooper was undertaking an equally spectacular project at 64 Fore Street (now Lloyds Bank). All were completed at around the same time in the early to mid-1720s.

An article in the Gloucester Record newspaper published around 25 years later said that Parade House "consists of five large lofty rooms on the first [or ground] floor, viz. a spacious hall and two very good parlours in the front neatly wainscoted, a drawing-room, a servants-hall, and two stair-cases behind; a proportionable number of lodging-rooms on the second and third floors with closets and other conveniences, the front freestone carved and sash'd; a court before the house with iron gates, and a large paved court behind; the kitchen, cellars, and offices under ground, exceeding convenient and well-supplied with water; a pleasant garden behind with a good wall. It stands on the cleanest spit of ground in the town, a good distance from the common road, and a convenient distance from the church and market."

Robert resided in Parade House until his death in 1738 and was interred alongside his father and his second wife Sarah in the vault of the Unitarian Meeting House in The Conigre. However, his death, without issue and without a will, caused a certain amount of confusion. Administration was granted to his nephew Joseph Houlton III, but Robert appears to have been heavily indebted, and most of the estate was eventually divided between his creditors. These included John Cooper, the owner of 64 Fore Street, who took control not only of Parade House but also Robert's mills and other estates.

=== After 1740 ===
With a grand house of their own just up the road, the Cooper family had no need to live in Parade House, and the property was let for several years to one Maurice Jarvis, apothecary. In 1765, the Cooper family put the building up for sale and it was purchased for £450 by another clothier, Isaac Green, who lived a little further down the Parade. Green too let out the building, on this occasion to another tradesman, Thomas Turner, who had recently married Joanna Cook, one of the founders of Trowbridge's Tabernacle Church. Turner set himself up as a seller of "all sorts of grocery, spirituous liquors, tea, coffee, chocolate, etc. wholesale and retail, the best of its kind, and at the lowest prices". The business was conducted on the ground floor of the house, most probably, while the family lived upstairs.

Only a year after they moved in, the house was badly damaged in a fire caused accidentally by a careless serving boy. This forced them to move further down the road to 75 Fore Street. Following repairs, the house was let for a time to Elizabeth Bythesea before being purchased by Thomas Turner in 1790. A few years later he was obliged to surrender the property to the Tabernacle minister John Clark after defaulting on debts, and it was eventually purchased by Thomas Timbrell, of a local family of lawyers and bankers. Throughout this period, though, it continued to be let to a series of tradespeople: John Ching, grocer and linen draper for most of the first decade of the 1800s, and later to surgeon and apothecary John Warren Cary.

The Timbrell family eventually sold the house in 1839 to the cloth merchant Samuel Salter, who let it to his niece Sarah and her husband Jesse Gouldsmith, who later became general manager of Salter's Home Mills on the site of what is now the Shires shopping centre. The Gouldsmiths lived at Parade House until 1863 when they moved to a large mansion in Clifton, Bristol. Parade House was owned and occupied for a while by J. G. Strachan, another partner in Home Mill, but he too put the building up for sale in 1866.

It is not clear who owned the building for the rest of the century, but it was once again let to tradespeople throughout that period. These included the dentist and chemist William Honey Hayward until 1880, and subsequently the drapers and dressmakers Arthur and Sarah Heathcote, who lived and traded from the property until 1901. At the 1911 Census, Parade House was occupied by Miss Kate Morris, an unmarried dressmaker, together with her assistant Sophia Pearson. Shortly afterwards, in around 1918, the building was acquired by Usher's Wiltshire Brewery, under whose ownership it was to remain until 2001. Parade House was the last of the row of fine buildings along Wicker Hill to be acquired by Ushers, and a series of passageways and staircases were built between the buildings to connect them. During the final decades of the brewery, Parade House served as the corporate headquarters for the business, housing the managing director's office and accounts department.

=== 21st century ===
Following the demise and break-up of Ushers Brewery in 2001, the company's various buildings along Fore Street were sold off to different owners. Over the following years, Parade House was used as corporate offices by a variety of separate companies. For about a year between 2003 and 2004 it became Trowbridge police station while a new station was being built in Polebarn Road. Ownership changed hands several times between 2001 and 2018. In 2021, application was made to Wiltshire Council to redevelop Parade House for multiple occupation, with the individual rooms converted to bedsits. Permission was granted, but the building was put up for sale again in 2022. That year it was purchased by local residents Carey and Simon Tesler who abandoned the conversion plan and instead relaunched the building as a venue for public and private events.
