= Tisbury, Wiltshire =

Village in Wiltshire, England

Coordinates: 51.065°N 2.081°W

Tisbury
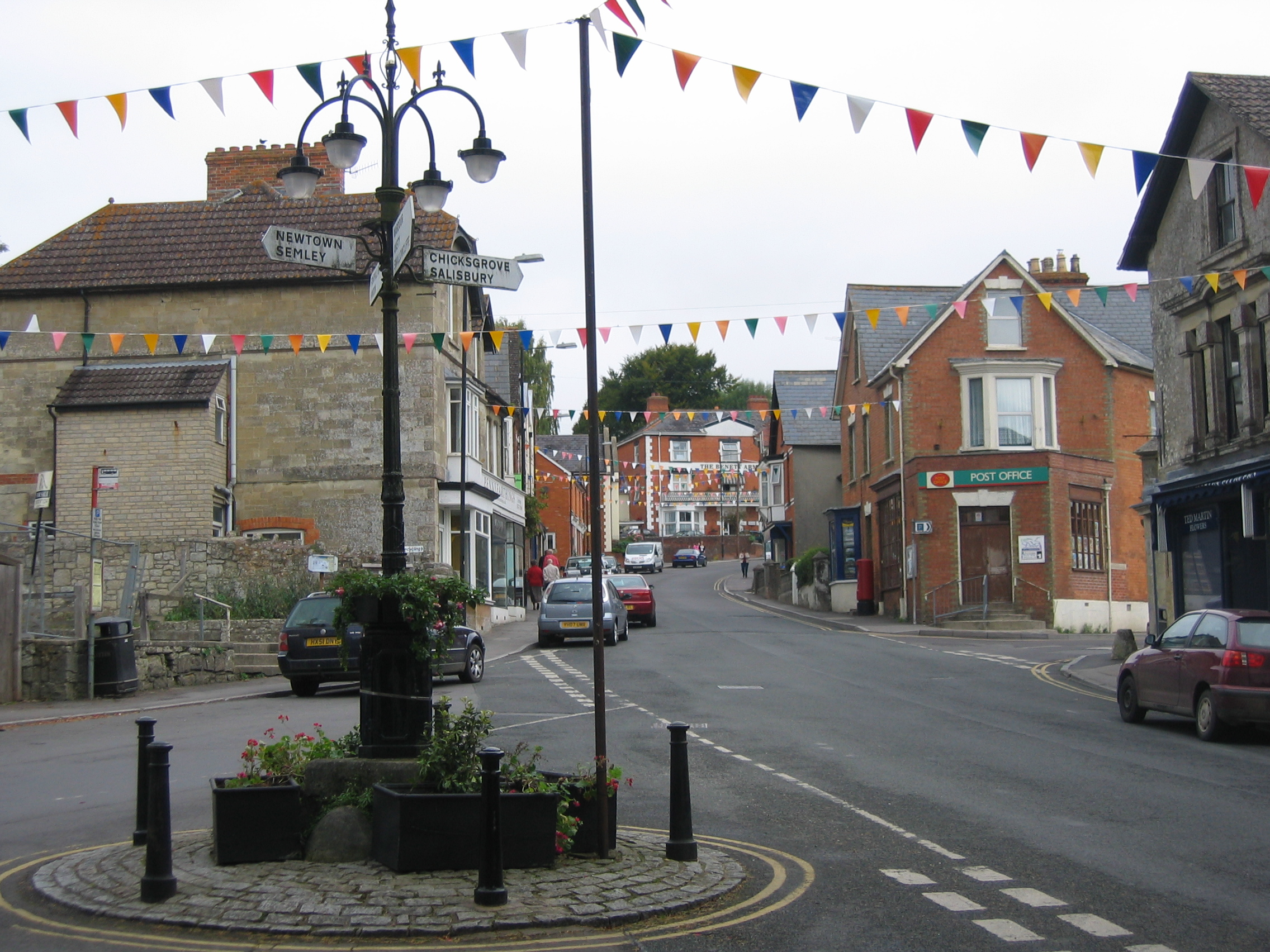
- The Square and High Street

- Location within Wiltshire
- Population: 2,253 (in 2011)
- OS grid reference: ST944295
- Unitary authority: Wiltshire
- Ceremonial county: Wiltshire
- Region: South West
- Country: England
- Sovereign state: United Kingdom
- Post town: Salisbury
- Postcode district: SP3
- Dialling code: 01747
- Police: Wiltshire
- Fire: Dorset and Wiltshire
- Ambulance: South Western
- UK Parliament: Salisbury
- Website: Parish Council

Tisbury is a large village and civil parish approximately 13 miles (21 km) west of Salisbury in the English county of Wiltshire. With a population at the 2011 census of 2,253 it is a centre for communities around the upper River Nadder and Vale of Wardour. The parish includes the hamlets of Upper Chicksgrove and Wardour.

Tisbury is the largest settlement within the Cranborne Chase and West Wiltshire Downs Area of Outstanding Natural Beauty (larger nearby settlements such as Salisbury and Shaftesbury are just outside it).

== Prehistory ==
The area has some paleoanthropological significance. Evidence of early human activity comes from the Middle Gravel at Swanscombe, Kent, a 400,000-year-old stratum, in which skull fragments of a young woman were found. Along with the remains were several fragments of Pseudodiplocoenia oblonga (also known as Isastraea oblonga), one of four Upper Jurassic species of coral unique to the Upper Portlandian of Tisbury. This indicates that the group to which the woman belonged travelled to the Tisbury area, or were part of a trade network linked to the locality. The coral-bearing chert found at Swanscombe has been interpreted as being intentionally carved to represent the profile of a hominid head, making Tisbury the source of materiel used in what is possibly one of the world's oldest pieces of art.

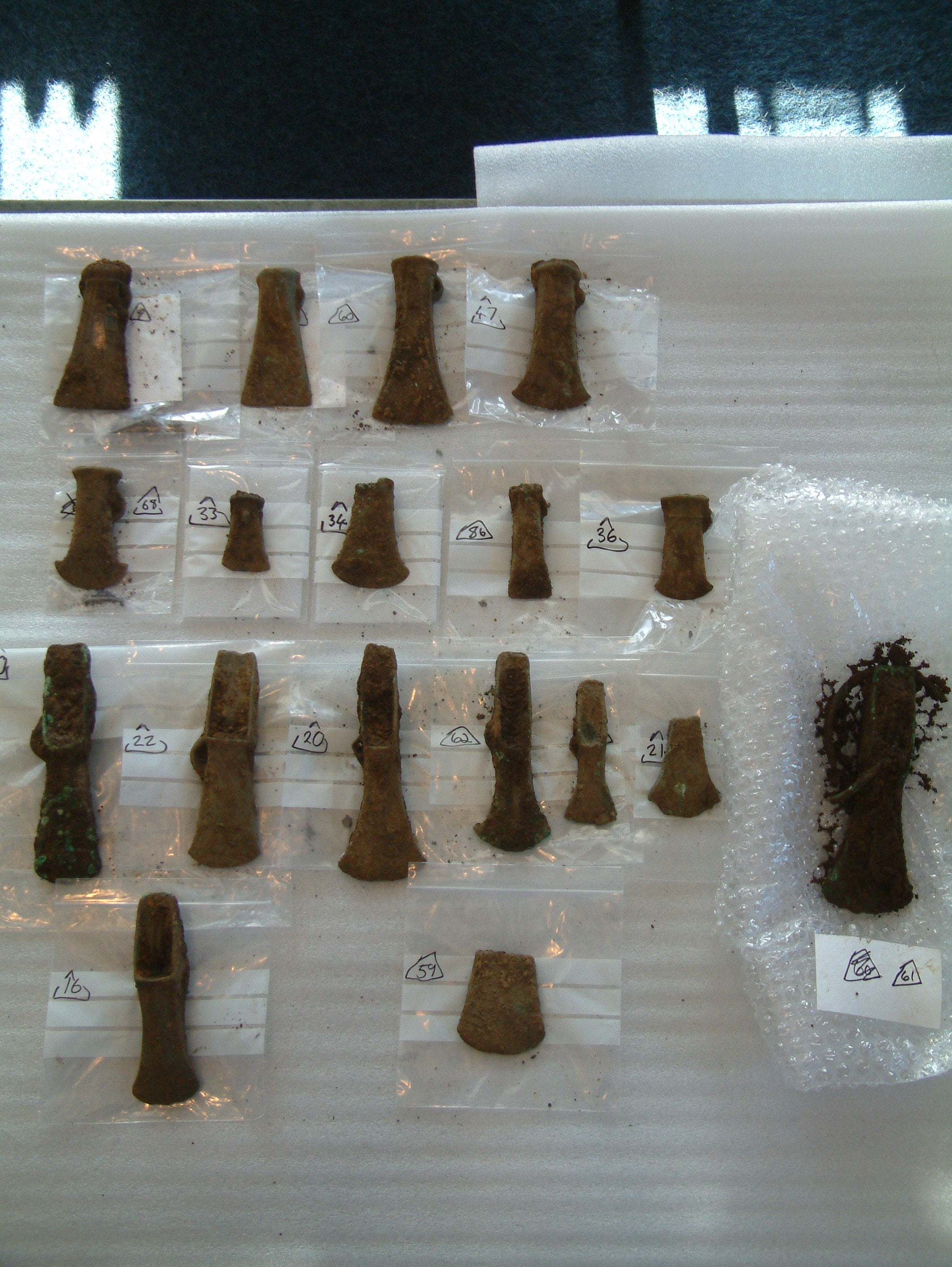
A selection of bronze axeheads from a Bronze Age hoard discovered at Tisbury

As in much of the Wiltshire Downs, there is also evidence of Bronze Age settlement. The Tisbury Hoard comprising 114 bronze items, discovered in 2011, is from the 9th to 8th century BC. To the southeast of the village lies a large hillfort, now known as Castle Ditches, which was referred to as Willburge in a charter of 984 A.D. Enclosed within ramparts of the fort is a long barrow measuring 60m long, 25m wide and 0.7m high.

A stone circle once stood in one of three adjacent fields, one which was known as Lost Stone Field, near the junction of the Chicksgrove and Chilmark roads. These fields have been joined to form the present Cemetery Field. The last three remaining standing stones, removed in the latter part of the 18th century, now form part of the grotto at Old Wardour.

== History ==
There are known early references between 710 and 716 to Wintra, Abbot of Tisbury, and in 759 monks of Tisbury are mentioned in a grant of land to Abbot Ecgnold and his familia (community) at Tisbury Grange. The monastery may have been founded as early as 705 and may have been sited near an old cemetery discovered north of Church Street.

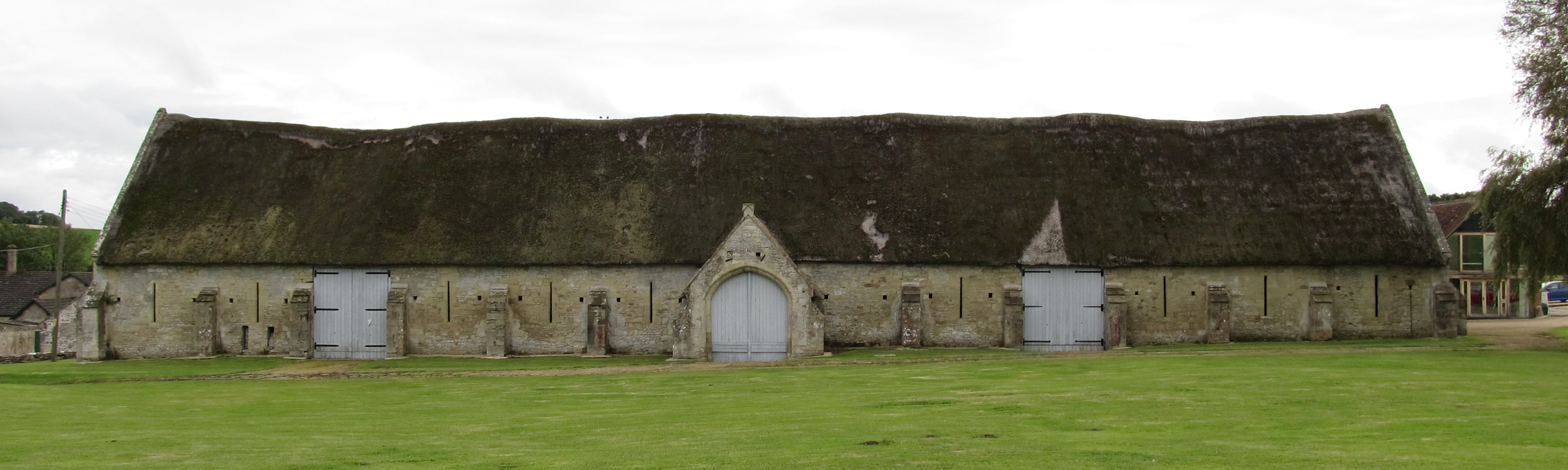
The thatched 15th-century tithe barn at Place Farm

The Saxon settlement came into the possession of Shaftesbury Abbey, as recorded in Domesday Book of 1086, when there was a relatively large settlement of 90 households at Tisseberie. The abbey's administration centre was the monastic grange, where the 14th-century building, now a house at Place Farm is Grade I listed, as are the outer and inner gatehouses, built in limestone in the 15th century. The thatched tithe barn is also Grade I listed; it is now used as a multi-purpose gallery and arts centre, managed by Messums Wiltshire.

The village's 13th-century prosperity came from the quarries that produced stone for the building of Salisbury Cathedral, and from the wool that supported a local cloth industry. The village suffered a serious setback with the Black Death in the mid-14th century but slowly recovered. Gaston Manor, close to the High Street, is a former 14th-century hall house which was rebuilt and then extended in the 16th and 17th centuries. To the southwest of the village centre are the remains of the village of Wyck, a deserted medieval village abandoned in the 14th century.

Some idea of the population of the area in the 14th century is given by the number assessed as being liable to the poll tax of 1377: every lay person over the age of 14 years who was not a beggar had to pay a groat (4d) to the Crown. The number of taxpayers in Hatch, East and West (in Tisbury) was 152, and in Tisbury there were 281. On John Speed's map of Wiltshire of 1611, the village's name is recorded as Tilburye: the cartographer or the engraver clearly having mistaken a long s for an l.

At Wardour, some 2 miles (3 km) southwest of Tisbury, the 14th-century Wardour Castle was badly damaged in the 1640s during the Civil War. It was superseded in the 1770s by New Wardour Castle, a country house in Palladian style, which was the seat of the Lords Arundell of Wardour until the 20th century. Both the ruins and the house are Grade I listed.

The Fonthill estate, formerly the site of country houses including Fonthill Splendens (18th century) and Fonthill Abbey (from 1796), straddles the parishes of Tisbury, Chilmark, East Knoyle, Fonthill Bishop, Fonthill Gifford, Hindon and West Tisbury. Most of the ornamental Fonthill Lake is within the parish, as the stream which marked the parish boundary was submerged when the lake was expanded. The estate is currently the seat of Alastair Morrison, 3rd Baron Margadale, who owns land and property in Tisbury including the former abbey site at Place Farm.

=== 19th century onwards ===
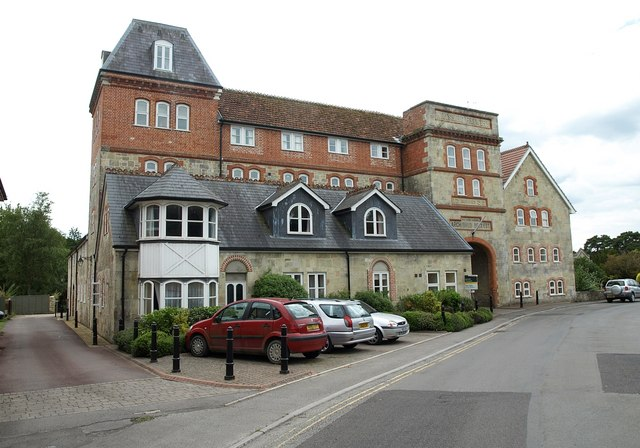
The former Wiltshire Brewery, Tisbury, built in 1885

Quarrying of stone increased from the mid-18th century, and by 1846 there were 40 quarries in the parish. The industry was most active later in that century and into the early 20th, although none of the quarries extended underground.

The Salisbury and Yeovil Railway opened Tisbury station with the first section of its line, from Salisbury to Gillingham, on 2 May 1859. The original plan for a railway west of Salisbury was to bypass Tisbury and Shaftesbury but the Quaker activist John Rutter campaigned for the line to be routed through both settlements. At first only passengers were catered for, but goods traffic started on 1 September 1860 with the line being extended to Exeter. Services were operated by the London and South Western Railway. By 1870 the line had been doubled, although the part crossing the parish was reduced to single track in 1967.

From 1861 the room above a building near to St John the Baptist parish church, known as The Rank, was used as a glove factory. It employed 36 women, and production continued until the early 1970s. In 1873 St. John's Infants' School was built midway up the High Street at the suggestion of Rev. F.E. Hutchinson. It was paid for by Lord Arundell, Sir Michael Shaw-Stewart and Alfred Morrison.

After the workhouse on Church Street closed in 1868, Archibald Beckett converted it to a brewery; it was later replaced by a steam brewery which in turn was rebuilt in 1885 after a fire. Beckett carried out other improvements including the construction of a new road through the village, the present-day High Street. From 1914 the brewery buildings housed a steam-powered flour mill, and later a mill for animal feed, which closed in 1964.

An Army Cadet Force detachment was based at the Victoria Hall from 2015 to 2025.

== Religious sites ==
=== Parish church ===
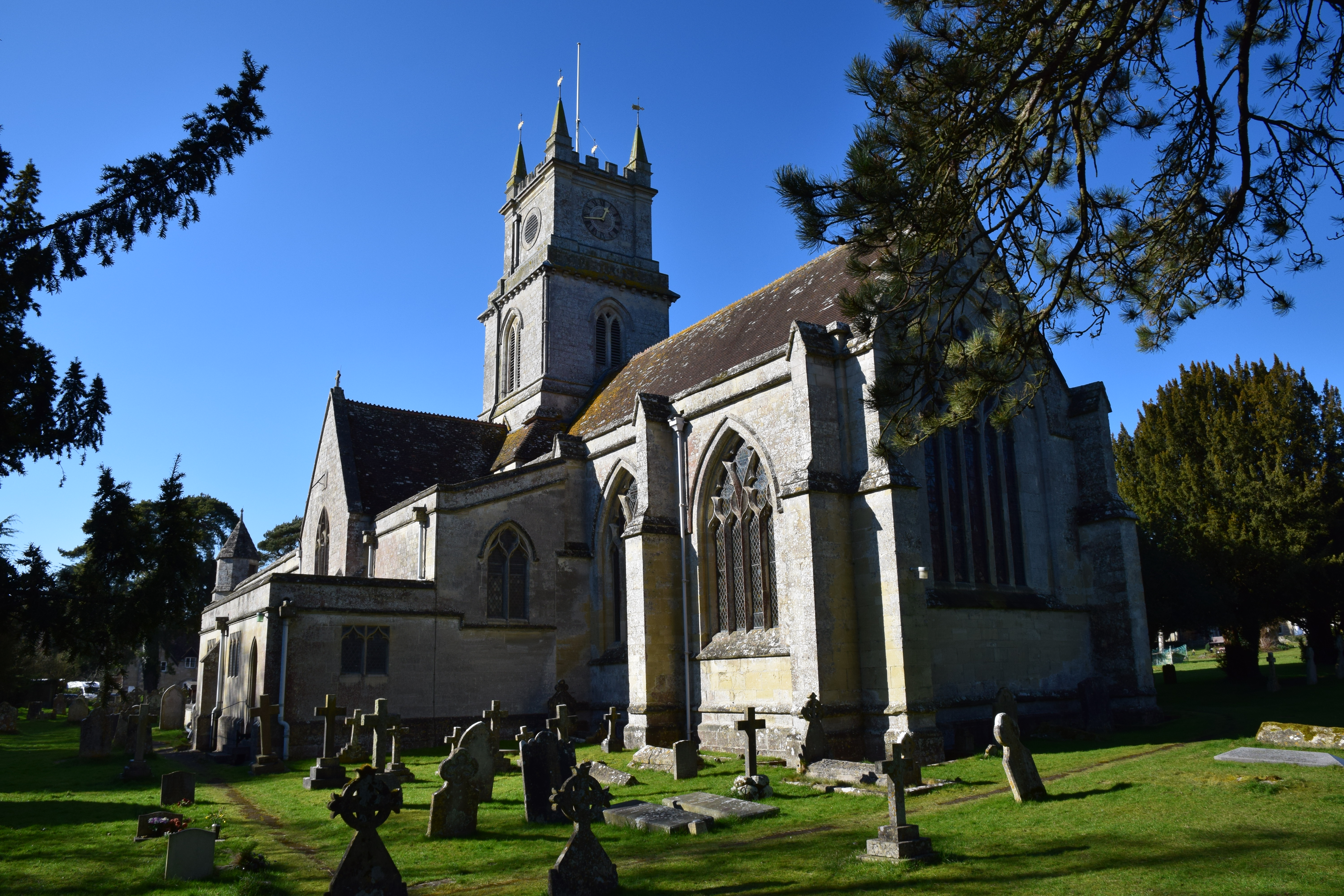
St John the Baptist's church

Pevsner describes the limestone parish church of St John the Baptist as "the largest church in its part of Wiltshire". It is a Grade I listed building.

The first record of the church is in the early 12th century and there are fragments of masonry from that time in the north and west walls of the nave. The base of the central tower is from the late 12th century and its first stage is from the 13th, as is the two-storey north porch. In 1299 the north transept became the Lady Chapel. The chancel was rebuilt in the late-13th or early-14th century, and in 1450 the nave was rebuilt, wider and with a clerestory and wagon roof; the roofline of the earlier nave is visible on the west wall of the tower.

The pews, choir stalls and pulpit were installed in the 1660s, and the font – possibly 13th-century – was restored at the same time. The reredos of 1884 is by Ewan Christian. The four bells were recast in 1700 and two more added in 1720; all remain in place except one of the 1720 pair, which cracked and was recast in 1989. The tower carried a spire, which fell in 1762 and was replaced by adding a shorter storey to the tower. The clock was fabricated by local clockmaker Thomas Osmond, father of William Osmond, mason at Salisbury Cathedral. Thomas Osmond was a resident of The Clockhouse on The Avenue and is buried at St John's, his gravestone showing a clockface. A church organ was installed in 1887 by the Victorian organ builder, "Father" Henry Willis. The organ was restored in 2014. Restoration in the 19th century included the building of the south vestry, and in 1927 the tower was restored and the bells rehung. The church was recorded as Grade I listed in 1966. In December 2024 the 1860 east window, designed by Charles Clutterbuck, was replaced with a new window, designed by artist Thomas Denny.

The largest of the yew trees in the churchyard is over 1,000 years old. Several chest tombs are listed structures, including three from the 17th century. Also here are the graves of Rudyard Kipling's parents, John and Alice.

==== Parish ====
Besides Tisbury, the ecclesiastical parish encompassed part of Wardour and the area which is now West Tisbury civil parish. In 1976 a team benefice was created to include the churches of Tisbury, Swallowcliffe, Ansty and Chilmark; today the parish is part of the Nadder Valley Team Ministry, a group of 15 churches.

St Andrew's church at Newtown (now in West Tisbury) was built in 1811 using Chilmark stone salvaged from a former church in the grounds of Pythouse. It was a chapel-of-ease of Tisbury until it was declared redundant in 1975, and is now in residential use.

=== Others ===
Zion Hill, a Congregational chapel, was opened in 1842 and went out of use sometime after 1977; it is now residential accommodation and is Grade II listed.

The Roman Catholic Church of The Sacred Heart was built on the lower High Street in 1898 with support from the Arundells of Wardour. The Arundells had a large private chapel at New Wardour Castle, built integral to the mansion in the 1770s and enlarged in 1789; now Grade I listed, it is owned by the Wardour Chapel Trust.

A Methodist chapel was built on the High Street in 1902.

== Education ==
A National School was built on church land immediately west of the church in 1843, replacing earlier informal schools; F. E. Hutchinson, vicar from 1858 to 1913, was much involved. A separate infants' school was built in 1873, and in 1905 the school for older children could accommodate 290. Children of all ages were educated until 1961, when Dunworth Secondary Modern School was built at Weaveland Road for those over 11. The 19th-century school remained in use until the opening in 1973 of a new primary school, next to the secondary school, and the redundant building became the village hall.

From 1983 the three-tier system was introduced and Dunworth School became the Nadder Church of England Middle School; children over 13 travelled to Shaftesbury. In 2004 the system reverted to two tiers: the middle school closed and its site was later used to build the Nadder Centre. The 1973 school continues as St John's CofE (VC) Primary School.

== Governance ==
The civil parish elects a parish council. It is in the area of Wiltshire Council, a unitary authority which is responsible for all significant local government functions.

The historic parish covered a large area. From at least the 15th century, until the early 19th century, the parish was split into the four tithings of Tisbury, Staple, Chicksgrove, and Hatch. In 1835, it was divided into three parishes: East Tisbury, West Tisbury and Wardour. In 1927, East Tisbury and Wardour were united as Tisbury civil parish.

== Notable people ==
Thomas Mayhew (1593–1682), who in 1642 established the first English settlement at Martha's Vineyard in North America, was born in Tisbury. Other people born in Tisbury include the Rev. William Jay (1769–1853, preacher); Christopher Hinton (1901–1983, nuclear engineer); and Gillian Lewis (stage and television actress). Etheldred Benett (1776–1845), the early geologist, was born at Tisbury and studied fossils in the area.

Sir Matthew Arundell of Wardour Castle, a great landowner and a cousin of Queen Elizabeth, was entombed in the parish church in 1598.

The Tisbury stonemasons Joseph and Josiah Lane, father and son, were responsible for the construction of many grottos during the 18th century in England.

The parents of poet Rudyard Kipling, Alice Kipling and John Lockwood Kipling, lived at Tisbury in later life. According to one source, "After a long and distinguished artistic career in India, the Kiplings moved to a residence along Hindon Lane which they renamed 'The Gables'. Their famous son visited them here and, whilst working on his novel Kim, his father (his illustrator) used the drawings of one of the pupils from Tisbury Boys' School as the model for the main character." In 2013, The Gables, with five bedrooms and an adjoining cricket pitch, was for sale at a price of £950,000. Rudyard Kipling rented Arundell House for a few months in 1894 when his parents lived at The Gables.

Paul Hardy, the illustrator, was a resident of Arundell House.

Ecclesiastical architect Edward Doran Webb (1864–1931) lived at Gaston Manor in Tisbury. Other Tisbury residents included Northern Irish colonial administrator and politician Henry Clark (1929–2012), army officer and campaigner for refugees Major Derek Cooper (1912–2007) and businessman John Meade, 7th Earl of Clanwilliam (1919–2009).

Charles "Snaffles" Payne (1884–1967), humorous painter, lived and worked at Tisbury from the late 1940s. The artist and children's book author John Strickland Goodall lived in Tisbury in 1946.

Sir Horace Rumbold (1869–1941), diplomat, lived at Tisbury in later life.

Charles McLelland (1930–2004), controller of BBC Radio 1 and BBC Radio 2 from 1976 to 1978, and the controller solely of BBC Radio 2 from 1978 to 1980, lived at Tisbury in later life.

Martin Fleischmann (1927–2012), a chemist noted for his work in electrochemistry and (controversially) cold fusion, moved to Tisbury following his retirement as Professor of Electrochemistry at Southampton University.

Robert Willis (1947−2024), later Dean of Canterbury from 2001 to 2022, was team rector of Tisbury from 1978 to 1987.

== Amenities ==
In August 2016 Wiltshire Council opened the Nadder Centre, which provides leisure activities and is home to the local library. Since April 2017, after the closure of the local police station, the Nadder Centre provides basic facilities for police officers patrolling the area.

Next to the Nadder Centre is an open-air heated swimming pool, the only one of its type in Wiltshire. The village has an amateur dramatic society, the Tisbury Arts Group, which also hosts regular musical events. Tisbury holds an annual carnival, usually in September, which celebrated its centenary in 2019. However, in 2020 and 2021, the event was cancelled due to restrictions in effect for COVID-19. There is a biannual Brocante, "A Festival of Antiques and Vintage Finds".

The village hall for the parish is the Victoria Hall, on the High Street. It is run by a charity, Victoria Hall Tisbury Ltd.

There is a small fire station, run by Dorset & Wiltshire Fire and Rescue Service, with one pumping appliance and a Land Rover, and staffed by retained firefighters. In 2017, Tisbury was listed in the Sunday Times 'Best Places to Live' rundown.

In 2025 Tisbury Croquet Club won Croquet England's Apps Heley Award for raising more than £30,000 to create a croquet club in Tisbury.

Lady Down Quarry, in the north-east of the parish, is a geological Site of Special Scientific Interest.

In 2026 a community led plan to install 416 solar panels at Pythouse Farm was approved. The plan was submitted by Nadder Community Energy Group which has previously funded Tisbury Electric Car Club, a car-sharing cooperative.

== Transport ==
Tisbury railway station is on the West of England Main Line, placing its residents within commuting distance of London. The village is 2.5 miles (4.0 km) from the A303 trunk road linking Andover with the West Country. Salisbury Reds operate three buses a day from Tisbury to Salisbury and two in the other direction, as of 2019. Buses on the Shaftesbury to Salisbury service, also operated by Salisbury Reds, call at Tisbury. The village is also served by TISBUS, a community transport organisation which provides weekly shopping trips to Salisbury, Gillingham, Warminster and Shaftesbury.

== Planned housing ==
In 2021, Tisbury Community Homes submitted outline plans for a development called Station Works, with 86 homes and a care home with up to 40 beds, on an industrial site adjacent to the railway line. The development would increase the village's population by 12%. Part of the site would be safeguarded for any future rail improvements, and businesses on the site would have to close with a loss of about 50 jobs. The Environment Agency objected to the development because of the potential increased risk of flooding. Tisbury Parish Council voted to object to the Station Works planning application in December 2021, and the Southern Area Planning Committee of Wiltshire Council refused the planning application. In March 2023, crowd-funding organised by Tisbury residents raised over £15,000 for potential legal costs to challenge the development. In June 2023, the Planning Inspectorate dismissed the developer's appeal against the planning refusal.

== Film locations ==
Scenes of the fictional Locksley Castle for the 1991 film Robin Hood: Prince of Thieves were shot at Old Wardour Castle. Fonthill Lake was used for riverside scenes in the 2000 film Chocolat, starring Juliette Binoche and Johnny Depp.

Some scenes in the 2009 film Morris: A Life with Bells On were filmed in Tisbury, including at the Tisbury Sports Centre. Other scenes were filmed at the Compasses Inn nearby at Lower Chicksgrove.

== See also ==
- Blackmoor Vale and Vale of Wardour, a national character area
- Chicksgrove Quarry, a geological Site of Special Scientific Interest near Upper Chicksgrove
- Tisbury, Massachusetts, named after this Tisbury
