= Siege of Wardour Castle =

Engagement of the First English Civil War

Coordinates: 51°02′11″N 02°05′20″W

Sieges of Wardour Castle
- Part of the First English Civil War
- Defence of Wardour Castle (in 1643, after the painting by G. Cattermole, 1852)
Date	First siege 2–8 May 1643; Second siege November 1643 – March 1644
Location	Wardour Castle, Wiltshire, England
Result	Parliamentarian victory

Belligerents
Royalists	Parliamentarians

Commanders and leaders
First siege Lady Blanche Arundell Second siege Henry Arundell, 3rd Baron Arundell of Wardour	First siege Sir Edward Hungerford; William Strode Second siege Edmund Ludlow

Strength
First siege 25; Second siege variable; up to one regiment	First siege 1,300; Second siege 75
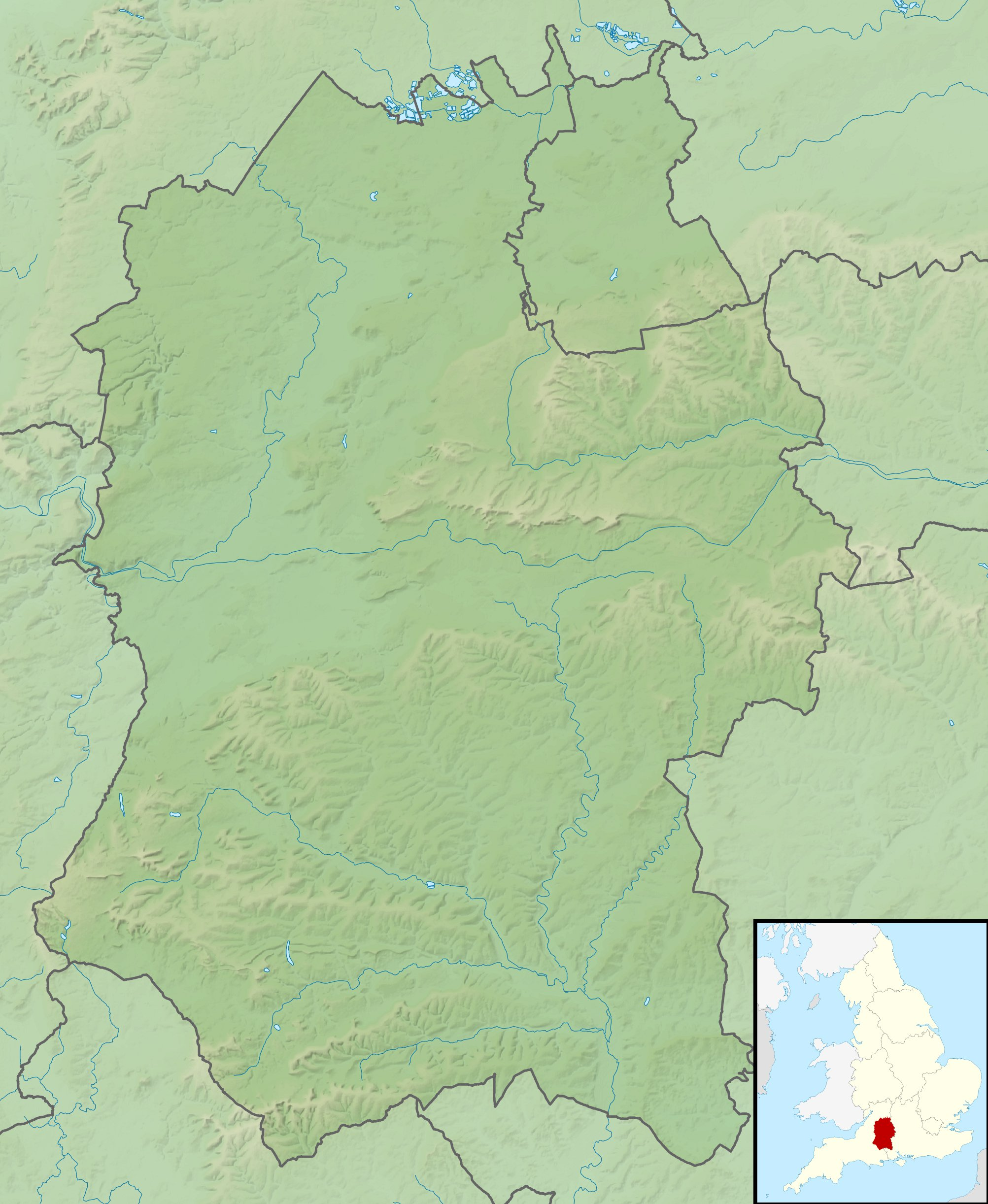
- Location within Wiltshire

Wardour Castle in Wiltshire, England, was besieged twice during the First English Civil War; once in May 1643, and then again between November 1643 and March 1644.

During the first siege, a Parliamentarian force of around 1,300 men led by Sir Edward Hungerford attacked the castle, which was the home of Thomas Arundell, 2nd Baron Arundell of Wardour, a prominent Catholic and Royalist. Arundell was absent, fighting for King Charles at the time of the attack, and the defence was led by his wife, Lady Blanche Arundell, in command of 25 soldiers. The siege began on 2 May, and lasted for a week before the Parliamentarians forced Lady Arundell to surrender on 8 May. The Parliamentarians garrisoned the castle with 75 men, led by Colonel Edmund Ludlow.

Henry Arundell, 3rd Baron Arundell of Wardour, the son of Thomas and Blanche, brought a Royalist force to reclaim the castle, and by November 1643 a tight blockade had been established. The castle was well-provisioned, and it was only when the Royalists exploded mines under the walls, creating large holes in the defences, that they forced the castle's surrender. The damage to the castle left it uninhabitable, and over 100 years later, the Arundell family commissioned New Wardour Castle to be built nearby.

== Background ==
The Arundell family were prominent Catholics; Thomas Arundell, 1st Baron Arundell of Wardour, was in and out of royal favour, was arrested in 1580 for what was described by his biographer Andrew J. Hopper as "his catholic zeal", and later for accepting the title of Count of the Holy Roman Empire in 1595. He was also suspected of involvement in the Gunpowder Plot, an attempt by dissident Catholics to assassinate King James. His son, Thomas Arundell (later the second Baron Arundell of Wardour, from 1639), married Lady Blanche Somerset, herself daughter of Edward Somerset, 4th Earl of Worcester, who was described by the historian Stephen Manganiello as a "stiff papist". Arundell's support of King Charles led to an arrest warrant being issued for him by Parliament in November 1641, and at the outbreak of the First English Civil War, he raised a cavalry regiment in support of the Royalist cause, and left Wardour Castle to fight for the King.

=== Wardour Castle ===
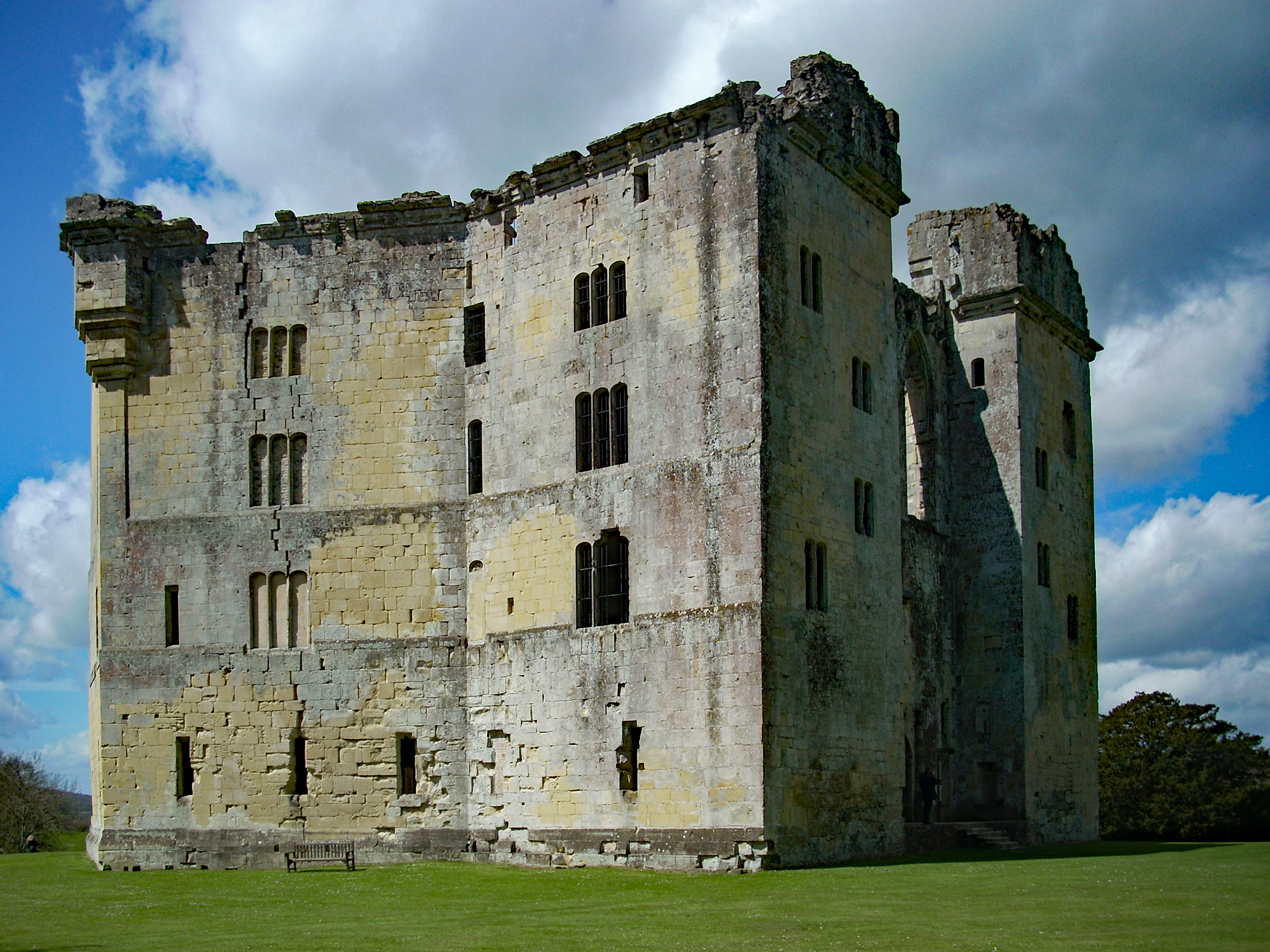
Ruins of Wardour Castle

Wardour Castle is in southwest Wiltshire between the villages of Donhead St Andrew and Tisbury, around 15 miles (24 km) west of Salisbury. It was built in the late 14th century, by the 5th Baron Lovel, and bought by the Arundell family in the 1540s. The castle was subsequently confiscated by the Crown, and then bought back in 1570 by Sir Matthew Arundell, who oversaw its conversion to more of a stately home, work that made it less defensible. Despite these modifications, the castle remained a significant fortification, and was described by the 17th century antiquarian John Aubrey as being "very strongly built of freestone". The castle's defences were strengthened during the early stages of the Civil War.

== First siege ==
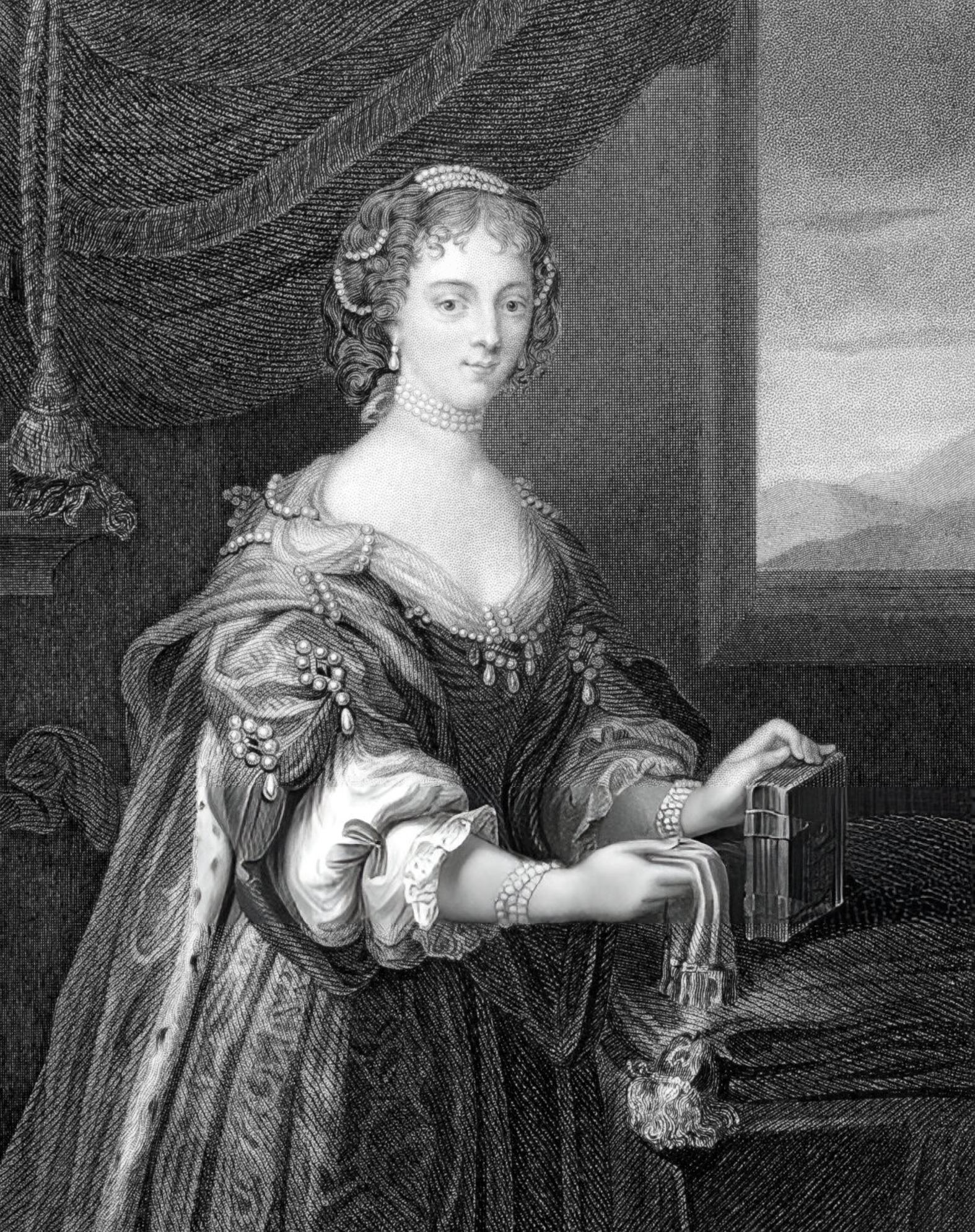
Lady Blanche Arundell held the castle for the Royalist cause in her husband's absence.

On 2 May 1643, Sir Edward Hungerford, the Parliamentarian commander-in-chief for the county of Wiltshire, arrived at Wardour Castle and ordered its surrender, as it was claimed to be a known refuge of Royalists (described contemporarily as "cavaliers and malignants"). Lady Arundell refused, responding that "she knew her duty and absolutely refused to deliver up the castle; she had a command from her lord to keep it, and she would obey his command". Hungerford, finding that the castle was stronger than he had expected, added reinforcements to his force: troops out of Somerset commanded by Colonel William Strode. The combined force numbered around 1,300 men: in comparison, the castle housed around 55 people, only 25 of whom were able fighters. Alongside Lady Arundell, who was aged 60, was her daughter-in-law (Cicely) with her three young children, and around fifty servants, including the guards and soldiers.

The castle was besieged for six days. Accounts from Royalists and Parliamentarians vary on the effectiveness of the siege: Bruno Ryves, a Royalist propagandist, described that due to attacks which continued throughout day and night, the castle inhabitants were "so distracted between hunger and want of rest, that when the hand endeavoured to administer food, surprised with sleep it forgot its employment, the morsels falling from their hands". In contrast, the Parliamentarian officer Edmund Ludlow wrote that when he arrived on 8 May, little damage had been done to the house other than to one of the chimneys.

On the day of Ludlow's arrival, the Parliamentarians blew up two or three barrels of gunpowder under one of the castle walls, where there was an opening "for the conveying away of filth", and destroyed part of the wall. Lady Arundell initially rejected the terms of surrender offered, which gave quarter to the women and children, but not the men. However, when the Parliamentarians threatened to mine the other wall, and to launch fireballs in through their broken windows, she relented.

After their capture of the castle, the Parliamentarians ransacked it, causing around £100,000 worth of damage. (Note: Approximately £20,000,000 in 2025 terms.) Many of the stolen goods were immediately sold at low prices, but the more valuable loot was transported with the women to Shaftesbury. The women had been allowed to keep six servants, but otherwise only had the clothes they were wearing. From Shaftesbury they were transferred to Dorchester. Lady Arundell was released shortly thereafter. During her incarceration, her husband had been killed in the Battle of Stratton, and she sought the protection of the Marquess of Hertford, a Royalist commander. Lady Arundell's grandchildren were held until May 1644, when they were released in a prisoner exchange for the children of a Parliamentarian.

== Second siege ==
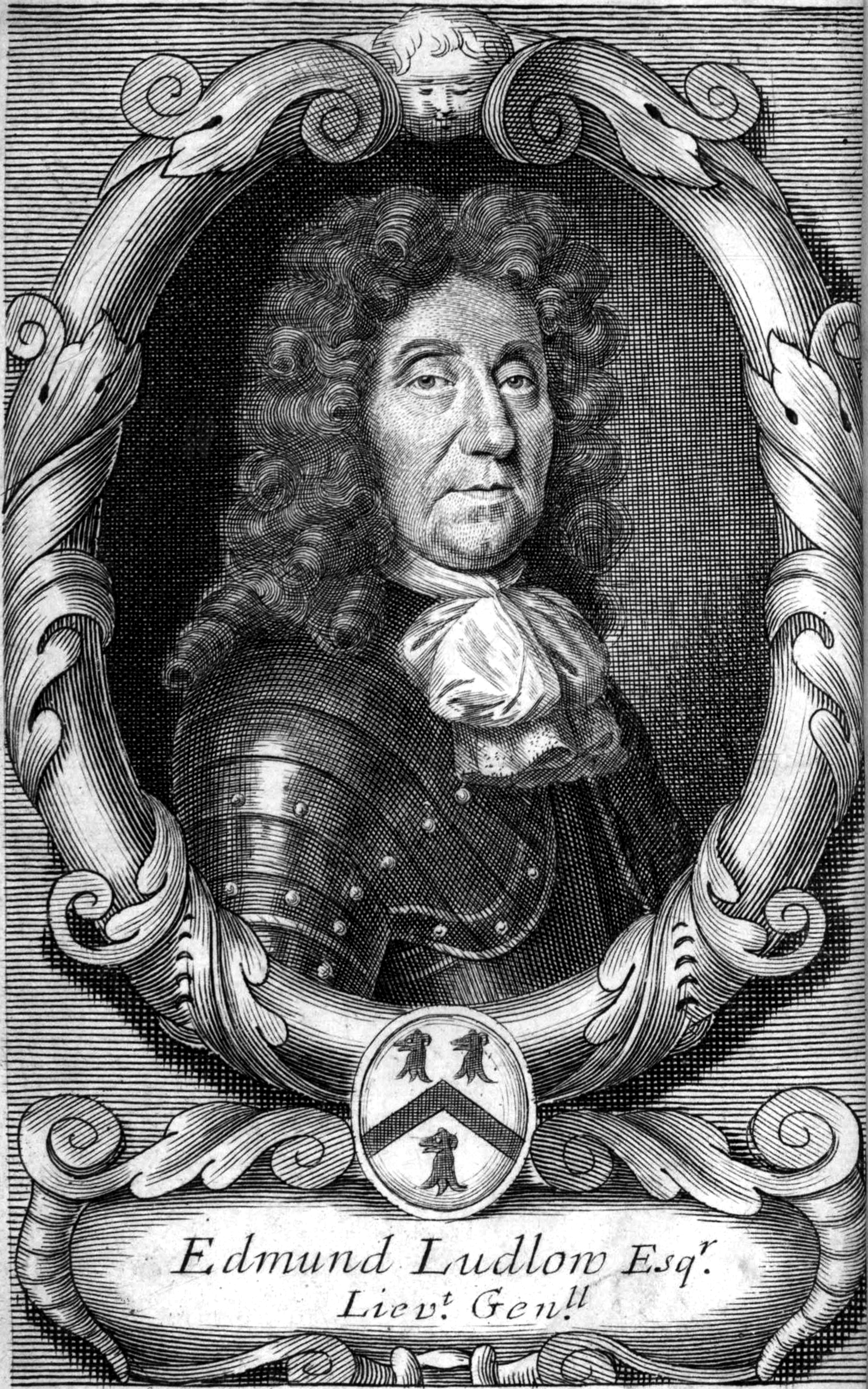
Edmund Ludlow held the castle for the Parliamentarians during the second siege.

After the castle was captured in the first siege, Colonel Edmund Ludlow was appointed as the governor of Wardour Castle, and garrisoned the castle with 75 men, comprising his own cavalry troop and a company of infantry led by Captain Bean, from Hungerford's men. The first challenge to the castle was posed by the Earl of Marlborough, who had men posted at Lord Cottington's house in nearby Fonthill Gifford. To combat attacks on the castle, Hungerford's cavalry drove Marlborough's men from the area. while Ludlow removed the siege works his army had built around the castle and sunk a well.

In a 1944 article in Wiltshire Archaeological and Natural History Magazine, the historian H. F. Chettle suggested that Henry Arundell, who upon his father's death had become the third Baron Arundell of Wardour, established a siege "a fortnight after he [Ludlow] had settled in". In his memoirs, Ludlow said that Arundell arrived at the castle with some cavalry, and demanded that it surrender for the King. Ludlow refused, stating that he was holding it for Parliament, and "could not surrender it without their command". Arundell did not have sufficient men to enforce a siege, so withdrew back to join the bulk of Hertford's Royalist forces. Although there was no formal blockade of the castle, the country around it was controlled by the Royalists.

In his memoirs Ludlow recalled that two more approaches were made to the castle, one by a relation of Lord Cottington, and the other a friend of Ludlow's, Robert Phelips. Both offered generous terms for the surrender of the castle to the Royalists, but in each case Ludlow refused, saying that he was "resolved to run all hazards in the discharge of that trust which I had undertaken". In order to stay well provisioned, the garrison ambushed farmers on their way to market in Shaftesbury and took their produce, recompensing them at market rates. The Royalists attempted to retake the castle by infiltrating the garrison with a young boy, reckoned by Ludlow to be "not above twelve years of age." The boy was tasked with poisoning the well and beer; sabotaging the weapons; counting the number of men in the garrison; and escaping. He was caught by the Parliamentarians and, after being threatened with execution, confessed.

Two brothers, identified by the historian F. T. R. Edgar as Captain Henry Bowyer and Lieutenant Francis Bowyer, had command of two troops of dragoons patrolling the area around the castle to defend against any sorties made by the garrison. In late October 1643, Lord Hopton planned to recapture Wardour for the Royalists, but was forced to change his plans after the Royalist capture of Winchester and his support in the Hampshire and Sussex campaigns was required. He was able to send reinforcements to the Bowyer brothers, Sir Charles Vavasour's infantry regiment. Ludlow's memoirs recount an approach by Captain Christopher Bowyer, who he says commanded the Royalist forces around the castle. (Note: It is unclear whether the Captain Christopher Bowyer listed by Ludlow is one of the Bowyer brothers listed by Edgar.) Bowyer tightened the blockade of the garrison, and demanded again that it surrender, threatening that more troops and artillery were on their way. Ludlow refused, and another member of the Parliamentarian garrison, Captain Bean, shot Bowyer in the heel. Bowyer died of the infected wound a couple of days later.

By mid to late November, Hopton met with Lord Arundell and Vavasour at Fonthill, where he learnt that Vavasour's regiment were mutinous. After hanging the ringleaders, Hopton requisitioned the regiment to join him in Winchester, and left a 300-strong infantry regiment led by Colonel George Barnes to maintain the siege. Barnes tightened the siege, keeping soldiers "within pistol-shot of it [the castle] night and day". Provisions within the castle began to run out; the well was dry by each evening, and they began slaughtering their horses for food. In December, Hopton sent Sir Francis Dodington with further reinforcements to aid in capturing the castle, including an engineer and some miners with him from the Mendip Hills. Dodington was a wealthy land-owner from Somerset who, according to the historian Michael J. French, had had "an unenviable reputation for ruthlessness and brutality".

After around three months of tunnelling under the castle's walls, Dodington offered the garrison another chance to surrender, which Ludlow once again rejected. A few days later the first mine was exploded. Two versions of the event are offered: Ludlow relates that when one of his large artillery guns fired, it caused one of the matches left burning by the Royalists to fall into the powder of the mine and detonate it. In Lise Hull's 2006 book, Britain's Medieval Castles, she says that one member of the Parliamentarian garrison "unwittingly tossed a match into the tunnel where a mine lay hidden". The resulting explosion destroyed the west wall of the castle, which according to Ludlow included the wall of his own room, from which he had to escape by dropping down onto a ladder two yards (1.8 m) below. Despite preventing the Royalists from storming the castle, Ludlow negotiated a surrender with Arundell and Dodington a few days later. They provided generous terms: quarter without distinction and civil usage for all, a speedy exchange, and not to be transported to Oxford.

== Aftermath ==
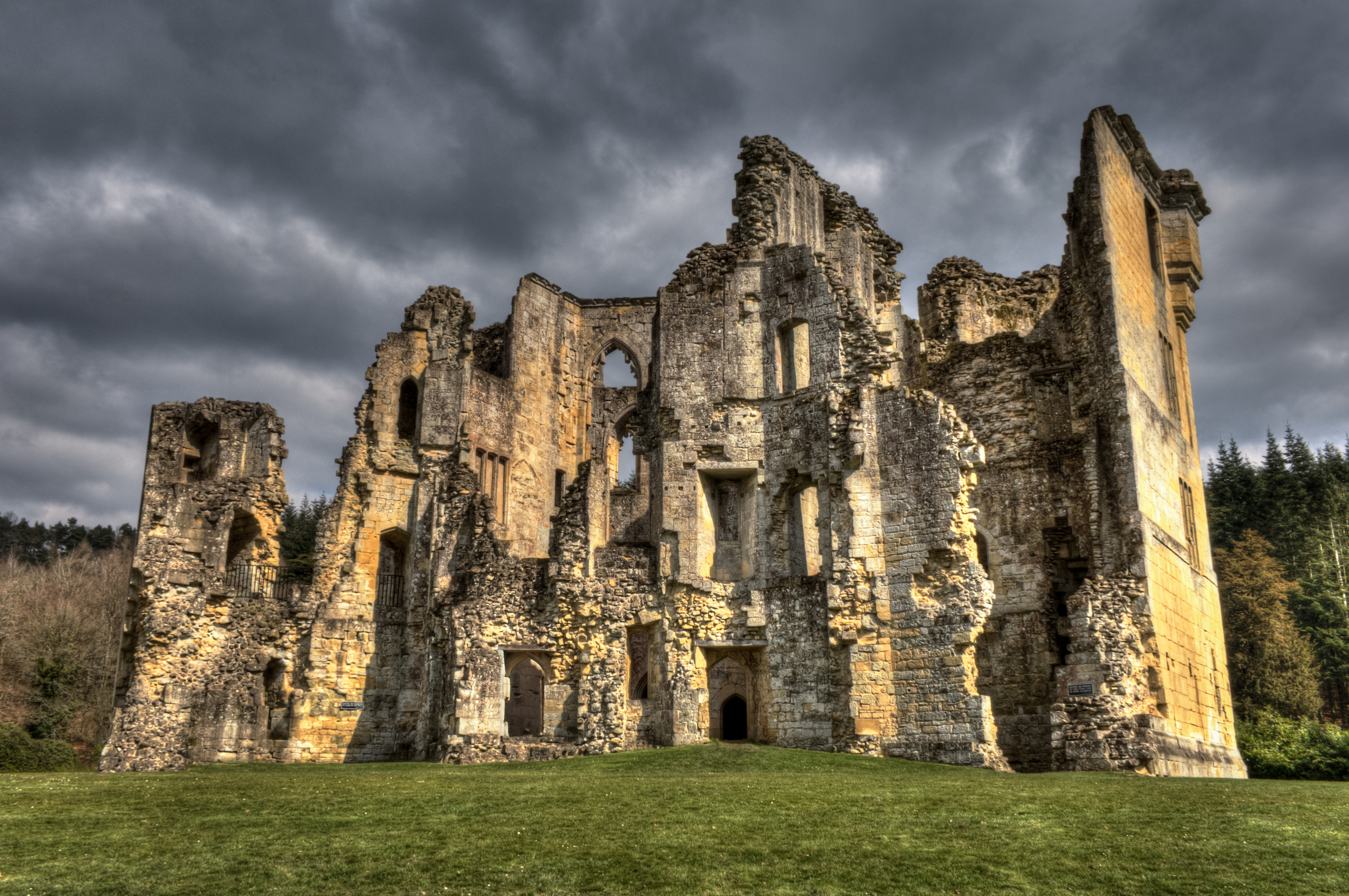
Wardour Castle was slighted after the Civil War

Despite the terms agreed, two of the soldiers taken prisoner from the garrison were arrested and executed as Royalist deserters, and Ludlow was taken to Oxford, where he was imprisoned. He was quickly exchanged, and by July 1644 he had returned to Wiltshire as High Sheriff, and a colonel under Sir William Waller.

Lord Arundell had reclaimed his family home but it was no longer habitable, and he subsequently had it slighted to prevent further use as a garrison, moving the family home to Breamore in Hampshire. A mansion was built near Wardour Castle, dubbed New Wardour Castle, between 1770 and 1776 by Henry Arundell, 8th Baron Arundell of Wardour.
