= Arundell family =

Cornish family of Norman origin

Arundell
- Sable, six martlets argent
- Current region: Cornwall
- Origin: Normandy
- Motto: Deo data (Given by God)

The Arundell family of Cornwall are a Cornish family of Norman origin.

== Lanherne ==
The Arundells of Lanherne—known historically as "the Great Arundells"—established themselves in Cornwall around the mid-thirteenth century at Lanherne, located on the western slope of a wooded valley between St Columb Major and the sea. This site is now occupied by the Carmelite convent founded in the late 18th century. It is possible that the family’s presence in Cornwall predates this, with earlier holdings at Trembleath in the neighboring parish of St Ervan, as noted in 19th-century local histories.

Claims that the Arundell family originated in England at the time of William the Conqueror (1066) remain unproven and rest primarily on family tradition rather than contemporary documentary evidence. While a Roger Arundel appears in the Domesday Book holding lands in south-western England, no direct genealogical link to the Cornish Arundells can be confirmed.

A William de Arundell, recorded as a canon of Exeter Cathedral who died in 1246, likely belonged to a clerical branch of the family, although this connection does not establish landownership or noble status. By 1260, the family had risen in prominence with Sir Ralph Arundell serving as sheriff of Cornwall, signaling their growing local influence. Around this period, John Arundell held lands at Efford near Bude, demonstrating the spread of the family name and estates across eastern Cornwall.

His grandson, Sir John Arundell, the Magnificent, was a great church benefactor (notably to the celebrated lost church of St Piran-in-the-Sands—Perranzabuloe), and, according to his will, dated 18 April 1433, possessed no fewer than fifty-two complete suits of cloth of gold. He was a naval commander, and was sheriff of Cornwall four times, and M.P. for the county in 1422–23. The Arundells intermarried with most of the old Cornish families—nearly all of them now extinct—thus adding considerably to their vast possessions, until at length, in the twenty-ninth year of Henry VI, John Arundell, born about 1421, had become the largest-holding free tenant in Cornwall, his estates being of the value of 2,000l. per annum. He was sheriff and admiral of Cornwall, and a general for Henry VI in his French wars, but was attainted in 1483.

The Arundells acquired Lanherne by marriage with the heiress of that family; and they also formed, at different periods, alliances with the Carminows, the Grenvilles, the Bevils, the Lambournes, the Carews, the Trevanions, the Erisys, and other Cornish families. Another John Arundell was bishop of Exeter (1502–4); and of him too, as well as of another member of the Lanherne family, who became bishop of Chichester in 1458, fuller accounts will appear below. A grandson of the above-named admiral—also a Sir John Arundell—was made knight-banneret on the field of Thérouenne, died in 1545, and was buried in the church of St Mary Woolnoth, Lombard Street. He was the father of the erudite Mary Arundell.

Another Sir John Arundell, who died in 1589—or, according to the Isleworth Register (Oliver's Collections), in 1591—at Isleworth, was converted to Catholicism, as Dodd tells us in his 'Church History', by Father Cornelius (a native of the neighbouring town of Bodmin). In defence of Cornelius Sir John Arundell lost his own liberty, and was confined for nine years in Ely Palace, Holborn (cf. Morris's Troubles of our Catholic Forefathers, 1875; Simpson's Edmund Campion, 1867; and Challoner's Memoirs of Missionary Priests, 1803). The next prominent members of the Lanherne family are Sir Thomas (d. 1552) and Humphry Arundell (1513 – 1549/50), of both of whom accounts are given below. From Sir John Arundell, the knight-banneret of Thérouenne, descended the Arundells of Wardour Castle; and by the marriage of Lady Mary Bellings-Arundell, in 1739, to Henry, seventh Baron Arundell of Wardour, the Lanherne and Wardour branches of the family were, after a separation of more than two centuries, reunited.

== Trerice ==
The Arundells of Trerice were seated in the parish of Newlyn East, about five miles south of Lanherne; and some fine portions remain of their mansion of the sixteenth century. At an early period they had another residence at Allerford in West Somerset, but they were seated at Trerice at least as early as the reign of Edward III. At first they bore different arms from the Lanherne Arundells, apparently owing to a difference of opinion as to which was the elder branch; but ultimately they adopted the same, viz. sable, six swallows argent. However this may be, 'precisely to rip up the whole pedigree,' as Richard Carew, the Cornish historian, who married into the Tolverne branch of the family, observes, 'were more tedious than behooveful.' The earliest Trerice Arundell of note seems to have been a Sir John, vice-admiral of Cornwall early in the fifteenth century. When sheriff of Cornwall he was sent by King Edward IV to retake St Michael's Mount, which had been seized by the Earl of Oxford. Sir John had removed from Efford, by the seaside, to Trerice (an inland abode), owing, it is said, to a prophecy (Hals) that 'he would be slain in the sands.' Yet he did not avert his fate; for, on the strand near Marazion, he lost his life in 1471 in a skirmish; and his remains lie in the chapel of St Michael's Mount.

The Arundells of Trerice evidently continued in royal favour, for one of them received an autograph letter from the queen of Henry VII, announcing to him the birth of a prince, her son. Henry VIII appointed another Sir John Arundell (great-nephew of him who was killed at the Mount) his esquire of the body. He was known as 'Jack of Tilbury'. He is noticed below, as well as his grandson, 'John Game to the Toes'—'John for the King'—and his great-grandson, Richard Arundell, first Baron Arundell of Trerice. Carew is full of information as to this branch of the family. The male line of the family became extinct by the death of the fourth baron, John, in 1768; and Trerice ultimately passed into the hands of Sir Thomas Dyke Acland, Bart. An uncle of the last baron, the Hon. Richard Arundell, who died in 1759 without issue, was M.P. for Knaresborough, clerk of the pipe, surveyor of works, master and warden of the mint, and a commissioner of the treasury. Amongst the legal representatives of the Arundells of Trerice in 1829, was Ada Byron, daughter of the poet.

== Tolverne ==
The Arundells of Tolverne were seated at a very early date at the place on the left bank of the Fal which gives them their distinctive name; but no trace remains of their abode. They seem to have separated from the main stem of Lanherne at an earlier date than the Arundells of Trerice, and to have settled at Tolverne in the reign of Edward I, in consequence of Sir John Arundell of Trembleath (son of Sir Ralph Arundell of Lanherne, who was sheriff of Cornwall in 1260) marrying Joan le Soor of Tolverne. Sir Thomas Arundell, who died in 1443, is another of the early Arundells who appears upon the scene. Like the Arundells of Lanherne and Trerice, the Arundells of Tolverne intermarried with good Cornish blood, but this branch chose generally the western families for their alliances, such as Reskymer, Trefusis, St. Aubyn, Godolphin, and Trelawny. The grandson of Thomas Arundell, who died in 1552 (who was also called Thomas, and who was knighted by James I), having seriously impaired his fortune by endeavouring to discover an imaginary island in America, called 'Old Brazil', sold Tolverne, and afterwards lived at Truthall in the parish of Sithney. John Arundell, son of Sir Thomas, one of the Truthall Arundells, was a colonel of horse for Charles II, and a deputy governor of Pendennis Castle, in 1665, under his relative Richard, Baron Arundell of Trerice; he died in 1671.

Of the Minor Arundells, the branch which settled at Menadarva, in the parish of lllogan, appears to have been founded by one Robert Arundell, a natural son of 'Jack of Tilbury'. Hals has, as usual, some odd gossip about him. One of his descendants, Francis Arundell of Trengwainton near Penzance, was born about the year 1620, and died in 1697. He followed that unusual course amongst the Cornish gentry of taking up arms for the parliament, holding the rank of captain. The Arundells sold Menadarva in 1755 to the Bassets of Tehidy.

Another branch settled at Trevithick, about two miles west of St Columb Major. Various others of the minor Arundells appear from time to time (but fallen from their high estate) in the church registers in the eastern part of Cornwall: one of the line, William, more than two centuries ago, married Dorothy, a descendant of that Theodoro Palæologus who was buried at Landulph in 1637. She is described in the parish register as being 'ex stirpe imperatorum;' so that there probably still flows in the veins of many a rustic in the neighbourhood of Callington and Saltash the mingled blood of those Arundells who came over to England with the Conqueror, and that of the Byzantine emperors of the East.

== Notable people ==
- Anne Arundell
- John Arundel (bishop of Exeter)
- John Arundell (born 1576)
- John Arundell (admiral) and Sheriff of Cornwall
- John Arundell (of Trerice, died 1580)
- John Arundell (1366–1435)
- John Arundell (1392–1423)
- John Arundell (1421–1473)
- Lady Blanche Arundell
- Baron Arundell of Trerice
- Charles Arundell
- Charles Calvert, 3rd Baron Baltimore
- Cicely Compton, Lady Arundell of Wardour
- Humphrey Arundell
- James Arundell, 10th Baron Arundell of Wardour
- John Arundell, 16th Baron Arundell of Wardour
- John Arundell, 2nd Baron Arundell of Trerice
- Mary Arundell (courtier)
- Matthew Arundell
- Richard Bellings (courtier)
- Richard Arundell
- Richard Arundell, 1st Baron Arundell of Trerice
- Thomas Arundell, 1st Baron Arundell of Wardour
- Thomas Arundell, 2nd Baron Arundell of Wardour
- Thomas Arundell of Wardour Castle
- Thomas Arundell (of Duloe)
- Francis Tregian the Elder

== See also ==
- Anne Arundel County, Maryland, named after the eponymous family
