= Henry Arundell, 3rd Baron Arundell of Wardour =

English Baron

- Born: 23 February 1607/8
- Died: 28 December 1694
- Occupation: Peer of England

Henry Arundell, 3rd Baron Arundell of Wardour, PC (bef. 23 February 1607/8 – 28 December 1694) was a Peer of England during the 17th century, and the most famous of the Lords Arundell of Wardour. He served as Lord Privy Seal and Lord High Steward, and was appointed to the Privy Council. During the Popish Plot he suffered a long period of imprisonment, although he was never brought to trial.

== Early life ==
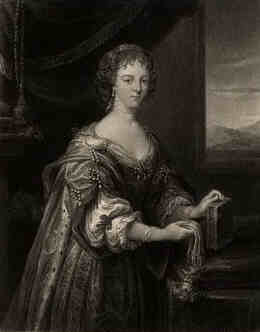
Lord Arundell's mother, Blanche Somerset

He was baptised on 23 February 1607/8 at St Andrew, Holborn, London. On the death of his father, who had been mortally wounded at the Battle of Stratton, on 19 May 1643 he succeeded to his estates and to his titles, which included that of Count of the Holy Roman Empire. Throughout his life a devoted Roman Catholic, he fought like his father on the side of Charles I in the First English Civil War. In May 1643 the parliamentarians wrested his ancestral home Wardour Castle, in Wiltshire, from his mother Lady Blanche Arundell who was defending it. In the following September Arundell laid siege to the castle and its new occupiers and fought in the re-taking from the rebels. By springing a mine and ruining the building, he finally dislodged the enemy under General Edmund Ludlow in March 1644, partly destroying it to prevent it being used as a fortress.

== Career ==
Henry Lord Arundell of Wardour (Restoration of Estate) Act 1660
- Act of Parliament
- Parliament of England
- Long title: An Act for the restoring of Henry Lord Arrundell of Warder to the Possession of his Estate.
- Citation: 12 Cha. 2. c. 16 Pr.
- Territorial extent: England and Wales

Dates
- Royal assent: 29 December 1660
- Commencement: 25 April 1660 (Note: Start of session.)

Status: Current legislation

On 13 May 1652 he acted as one of the seconds of his brother-in-law Colonel Henry Compton, in a duel with George Brydges, 6th Baron Chandos. Compton was killed, and a warrant was issued by the council of state to arrest Arundell with others who had taken part. On 17 May 1653, he was found guilty of manslaughter and sentenced to be burned in the hand. In that year Arundell appears to have petitioned Oliver Cromwell for pardon, and in 1656 to have received permission to take refuge in France. At the Restoration of Charles II, Arundell, on paying £35,000, was confirmed in all his family estates, many of which had been sold by the Commonwealth to Humphrey Weld. He regained possession of Wardour, but never had the money to properly rebuild it. On 7 March 1663 he was nominated and held the office of Master of the Horse to the Queen-Mother, Henrietta Maria.

In January 1669 he was summoned by Charles II of England, with other Roman Catholic peers, to a secret council, and was commissioned to proceed to France to inform Louis XIV of the English king's desire to be reconciled to Roman Catholicism, and of his want of ready money. In June 1669 Arundell returned with Louis's assent to the secret Treaty of Dover with Charles, which was signed in the following year.

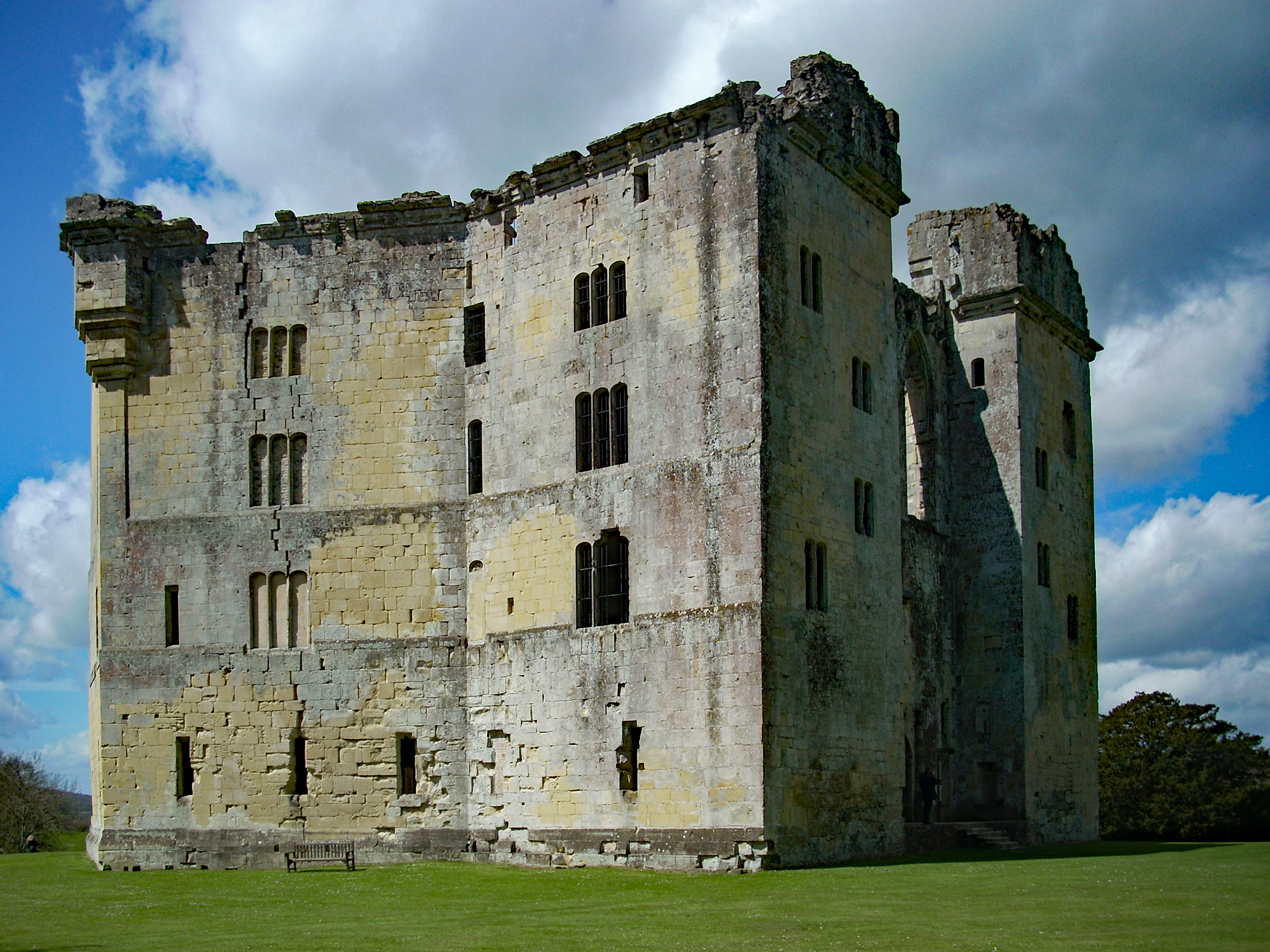
Wardour Castle

== Popish Plot ==
In 1678 Titus Oates and his associates announced that Arundell was a chief mover in the Popish Plot against Charles II, which they professed to have discovered; it was a complete fabrication. According to the evidence of these informers, attempts had been made by the Catholics of England, in league with Louis XIV, to raise an army of 50,000, which was to be placed under the command of Lord Arundell, William Herbert, 1st Earl of Powis, and John Belasyse, 1st Baron Belasyse. Some of the witnesses asserted that the Pope had issued a commission to Arundell to be Lord Chancellor as soon as the present ministers had been removed, and that Arundell had for many years been actively employed in arranging the details of the plot. Between October 1678 and February 1684 he was imprisoned in the Tower of London, along with other "Popish" peers, on the accusation of Titus Oates.

The charges were patently absurd: among other unlikely accusations, Arundell was alleged to have conspired with his fellow Catholic peer, William Howard, 1st Viscount Stafford (who was executed in 1680 for his supposed part in the Plot), although it was common knowledge that following a bitter quarrel they had not spoken to each other for some 25 years. Far from having any motive to kill the King, both were well aware of how much they had gained from his policy of religious tolerance. As Stafford sensibly remarked, simple self-interest dictated that the Catholic peerage should remain loyal to Charles ll, who in his later years was an all but open Catholic himself, whereby: "we have no interest but to be quiet". Arundell was friendly with Lord Belasyse, who like Arundell suffered a term of imprisonment as a supposed Plotter, and with the civil servant Edward Colman, an ardent Catholic who was executed for his supposed part in the Plot in December 1678, but there is no reason to think that there was anything sinister about these friendships. During his imprisonment in 1679, Arundell wrote five short religious poems, published in a single folio sheet in 1679, and reissued in A Collection of Eighty-six Loyal Poems in 1685.

== Later years ==
After the death of Charles II, his successor, James II, admitted Arundell, although he was a Roman Catholic, to the Privy Council (PC), to which he was admitted on 17 July/August 1686, and appointed him Keeper of the Privy Seal or Lord Privy Seal in place of Lord Clarendon on 11 March 1686/87, office he held. By royal dispensation, he was relieved of the necessity of taking the customary oaths on accepting office. In the following June Arundell presented an address to the King on behalf of the Roman Catholics, thanking him for the Declaration of Indulgence; uncharacteristically, he strongly opposed the admission of the Jesuit Edward Petre to the privy council. He received, on 24 June 1687, a bounty of £250 from the king for secret service. In 1688 he was one of the five Lords to whom King James II committed the administration of his affairs.

After the deposition of King James II, Arundell retired to his house at Breamore, Hampshire, and took no further part in public life. He died at Breamore on 28 December 1694, at the age of eighty-eight. He was buried with his ancestors at Tisbury, Wiltshire. He was a noted gambler and sportsman, and kept at Breamore a celebrated pack of hounds, which became the property of the Earl of Castlehaven, and subsequently of Hugo Meynell. From them, the Quorn Hunt's pack is descended.

== Family ==
He was the only son of Thomas Arundell, 2nd Baron Arundell of Wardour, by his wife, Blanche Somerset, daughter of Edward Somerset, 4th Earl of Worcester and his wife Elizabeth Hastings; Blanche was noted for her staunch defence of Wardour Castle during the Civil War.

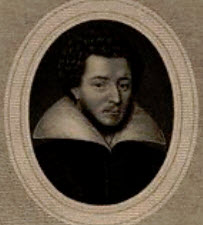
Thomas, 2nd Lord Arundell

He married Cicely Compton (c. 1610 – 24 March 1675/76), daughter of the Hon. Sir Henry Compton, Knt., of Brambletye, Sussex, invested as a Knight of the Order of the Bath (KB) on 25 July 1603, and his first wife Lady Cicely Sackville, and widow of Sir John Fermor. She was a granddaughter of Sir Henry Compton, 1st Baron Compton and of Robert Sackville, 2nd Earl of Dorset through her mother (herself a half-sister of Richard Sackville, 3rd Earl of Dorset and Edward Sackville, 4th Earl of Dorset). Her stepmother was Mary Browne, daughter of Sir George Browne, also a widow, of Thomas Paston, of Thorpe, Surrey.

Their children were:

1. Thomas Arundell, 4th Baron Arundell of Wardour, b. 1633, d. 10 Feb 1711/12 He became the fourth Lord Arundell of Wardour, and was in the retinue of Roger Palmer, 1st Earl of Castlemaine on his visit to Pope Innocent XI as James II's ambassador.
2. Hon. Henry Arundell. A settlement for the marriage between him and Mary Scrope was made on 10 February 1675. They had no issue.
3. Hon. Cicely Arundell, d. 1717, a nun at Rouen, Caux, France. She entered the order of Poor Clares of Rouen in 1662, and died at Rouen on 13 June 1717, at the age of eighty-two.

== Ancestry ==
Henry Arundell, 3rd Baron Arundell of Wardour's ancestors in three generations
Henry Arundell, 3rd Baron Arundell of Wardour	Father: Thomas Arundell, 2nd Baron Arundell of Wardour	Paternal Grandfather: Thomas Arundell, 1st Baron Arundell of Wardour	Paternal Great-grandfather: Sir Matthew Arundell, of Wardour Castle
Henry Arundell, 3rd Baron Arundell of Wardour	Father: Thomas Arundell, 2nd Baron Arundell of Wardour	Paternal Grandfather: Thomas Arundell, 1st Baron Arundell of Wardour	Paternal Great-grandmother: Margaret Willoughby
Henry Arundell, 3rd Baron Arundell of Wardour	Father: Thomas Arundell, 2nd Baron Arundell of Wardour	Paternal Grandmother: Mary Wriothesley, Baroness Arundell of Wardour	Paternal Great-grandfather: Henry Wriothesley, 2nd Earl of Southampton
Henry Arundell, 3rd Baron Arundell of Wardour	Father: Thomas Arundell, 2nd Baron Arundell of Wardour	Paternal Grandmother: Mary Wriothesley, Baroness Arundell of Wardour	Paternal Great-grandmother: Mary Browne
Henry Arundell, 3rd Baron Arundell of Wardour	Mother: Blanche Somerset, Baroness Arundell of Wardour	Maternal Grandfather: Edward Somerset, 4th Earl of Worcester	Maternal Great-grandfather: William Somerset, 3rd Earl of Worcester
Henry Arundell, 3rd Baron Arundell of Wardour	Mother: Blanche Somerset, Baroness Arundell of Wardour	Maternal Grandfather: Edward Somerset, 4th Earl of Worcester	Maternal Great-grandmother: Christian North
Henry Arundell, 3rd Baron Arundell of Wardour	Mother: Blanche Somerset, Baroness Arundell of Wardour	Maternal Grandmother: Elizabeth Hastings	Maternal Great-grandfather: Francis Hastings, 2nd Earl of Huntingdon
Henry Arundell, 3rd Baron Arundell of Wardour	Mother: Blanche Somerset, Baroness Arundell of Wardour	Maternal Grandmother: Elizabeth Hastings	Maternal Great-grandmother: Catherine Pole

== Notes ==
Political offices
Preceded by The Earl of Clarendon	Lord Privy Seal; 1687–1688	Succeeded by The Marquess of Halifax
Peerage of England
Preceded by Thomas Arundell	Baron Arundell of Wardour; 1643–1694	Succeeded by Thomas Arundell
