= Blanche Arundell, Baroness Arundell of Wardour =

English noblewoman (1583/84–1649)

The Right Honourable The Dowager Lady Arundell of Wardour
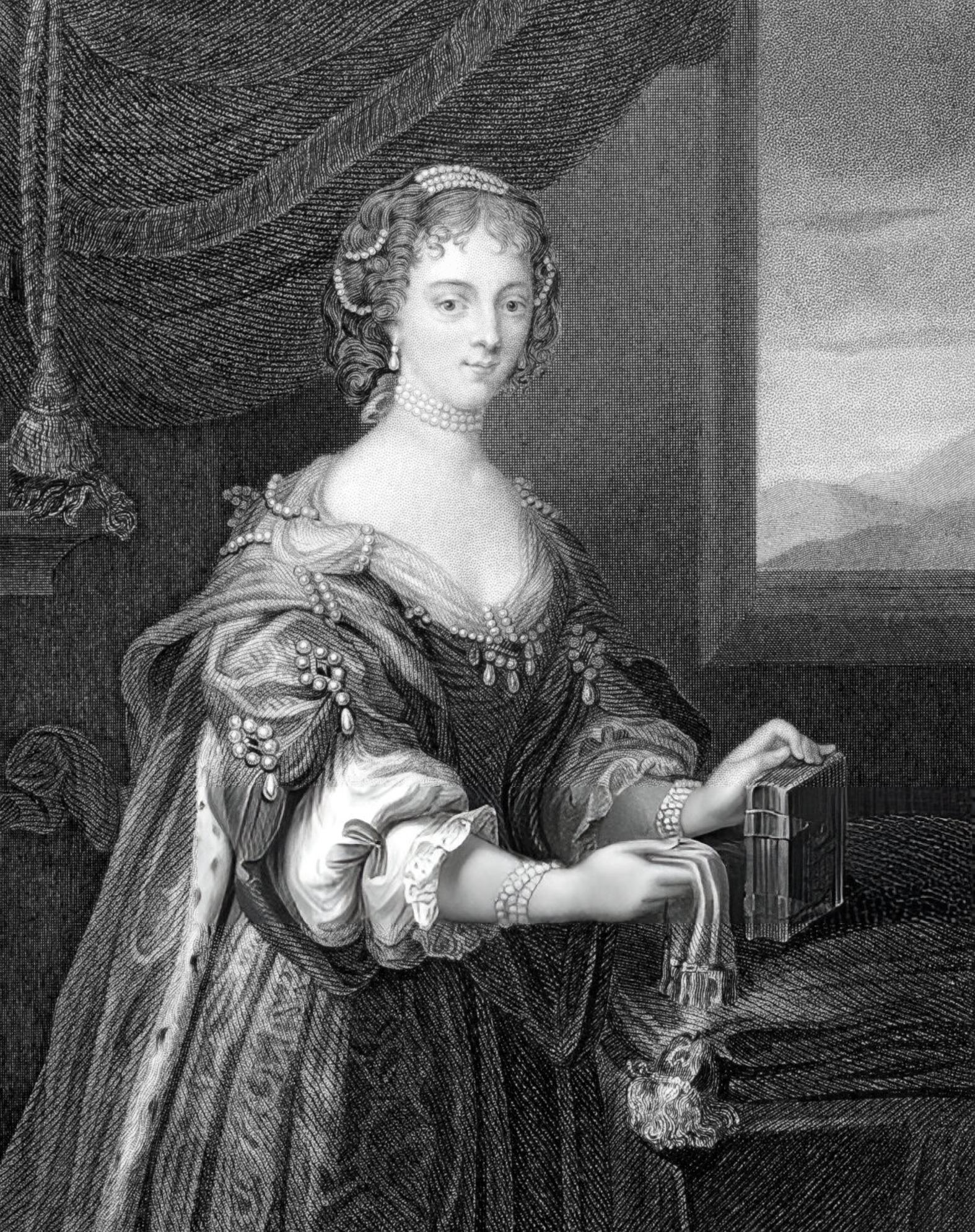
- Engraving of Lady Arundell of Wardour by Edward Scriven after an unknown artist
- Known for: Defender of Wardour Castle
- Born: Blanche Somerset; 1583
- Died: 28 October 1649 (aged 65–66); Winchester, Hampshire, England
- Buried: Tisbury, Wiltshire, England
- Noble family: Somerset (by birth); Arundell (by marriage)
- Spouse: Thomas Arundell, 2nd Baron Arundell of Wardour
- Issue: Henry Arundell, 3rd Baron Arundell of Wardour; Katherine Arundell; Anne Arundell
- Parents: Edward Somerset, 4th Earl of Worcester; Lady Elizabeth Hastings

Blanche Arundell, Dowager Baroness Arundell of Wardour (née Lady Blanche Somerset; 1583 or c. 1584 – 28 October 1649) was an English noblewoman, known as the defender of Wardour Castle, that she defended for nearly a week with just 25 men and her maidservants against a force of 1,300.

== Biography ==
Arundell was born Blanche Somerset in 1583 or 1584, daughter of Edward Somerset, 4th Earl of Worcester, and Lady Elizabeth Hastings.

She danced in the masque at the marriage of Anne Russell and Henry Somerset, 1st Marquess of Worcester in June 1600. The other dancers, led by Mary Fitton, were Lady Dougherty, Mistress Carey, Elizabeth Southwell, Mistress Onslow, Bess Russell, and Mistress Darcy. They wore skirts of cloth of silver, waistcoats embroidered with coloured silks and silver and gold thread, mantles of carnation taffeta, and "loose hair about their shoulders" which was also "curiously knotted and interlaced".

On 11 May 1607 (date of settlement for the marriage) she married Thomas Arundell, 2nd Baron Arundell of Wardour, son of Thomas Arundell, 1st Baron Arundell of Wardour, and Lady Mary Wriothesley. They had three children:

- Henry Arundell, 3rd Baron Arundell of Wardour
- Katherine Arundell
- Anne Arundell

Arundell was a lady-in-waiting to Anne of Denmark. John Finet described the reception of Isabelle Brûlart, the wife of French ambassador Gaspard Dauvet, Sieur des Marets, at Denmark House on the Strand in December 1617. He brought her to a chamber in the first court where she was joined by Arundell, Mistress Barbara Sidney (daughter of the Viscountess Lisle), Mistress Southwell of the queen's privy chamber, and Mistress Gargrave (one of her Majesty's maids of honour). A gentleman usher then took Brûlart to the queen in the Privy Chamber.

During the Civil War, Lord Arundell brought together a regiment of horsemen in support of King Charles I, whom he led into the Battle of Stratton in Cornwall on 16 May 1643. He was injured during the battle and died on 19 May 1643.

From 2 May 1643, during the absence of her husband, she defended Wardour Castle, near Tisbury, Wiltshire, for six days with only herself, her children, a few maidservants, and twenty-five men against the Parliamentary forces of thirteen hundred men and artillery commanded by two Parliamentary officers, Sir Edward Hungerford and Colonel Edmund Ludlow. She finally was forced to surrender on honourable terms. However, the terms were not honoured: the castle was sacked and she was removed as a prisoner to Shaftesbury. However, due to her illness, she was instead moved to Dorchester.

She died at Winchester, Hampshire, and was buried at Tisbury. Her will dated 28 September 1649 was probated on 2 November 1649.
