= Anne Arundell =

17th century English noblewoman

The Right Honourable The Lady Baltimore
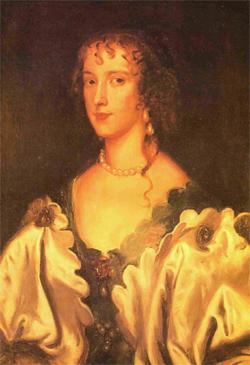

Personal details
- Born: c. 1615/1616 Old Wardour Castle, Tisbury, Wiltshire, Kingdom of England
- Died: 23 July 1649 (aged 32–34) Old Wardour Castle, Tisbury, Wiltshire, England
- Spouse: Cecil Calvert, 2nd Baron Baltimore (1605-1675)
- Children: 9, including title heir, Charles Calvert, 3rd Baron Baltimore
- Parent(s): Thomas Arundell, 1st Baron Arundell of Wardour; Anne Philipson

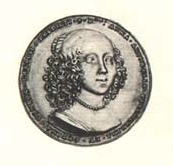
Anne Arundell, Lady Baltimore, (c.1615 / 1616 – 1649), namesake for Anne Arundel County, Maryland, wife of Cecil Calvert, 2nd Baron Baltimore], (1605–1675), Lord Baltimore, Lord Proprietor of Province of Maryland; minted silver medallion, National Gallery of Art, (Washington, D.C.)

Anne Calvert, Baroness Baltimore (née Hon. Anne Arundell; c. 1615/1616 – 23 July 1649) was an English noblewoman, the daughter of Thomas Arundell, 1st Baron Arundell of Wardour by his second wife Anne Philipson, and wife of Cecil Calvert, 2nd Baron Baltimore, who founded the Province of Maryland in 1634. She was also the namesake of Anne Arundel County, Maryland, and the US Navy transport ship USS Anne Arundel, which was named after the county.

She was the mother of 9 children, including Charles Calvert, the future third Baron Baltimore and Lord Proprietor of the province of Maryland, and died at the early age of 32–34 years.

== Family ==
She married Cecil Calvert, second Lord Baltimore. A settlement arrangement for the union was made on 20 March 1627/28. According to Gibbs, she is said to have been a most beautiful and accomplished woman. The marriage coincided with the groom's father Sir George Calvert, first Lord Baltimore, (1578–1632) embarking on his first colonial endeavor in Avalon, located in Newfoundland (of future eastern Canada). Following the failure of the Avalon Colony, Cecil Calvert oversaw a second colonial enterprise in 1633, this time aimed at the Chesapeake Bay area, north of the colony of Virginia. The new colony was named "Maryland" after Henrietta Maria, the French-born consort of King Charles I. Anne Arundel County, Maryland was named after her.

Four of the couple's nine children survived to adulthood.

- Charles Calvert, 3rd Baron Baltimore (b. 27 August 1637, died 21 February 1715)
- Hon. Cecil Calvert
- Hon. Georgiana Calvert (b. August 1629)
- Hon. Mary Calvert (born 18 July 1630)
- Hon. George Calvert (b. 15 September 1634 – d. Jun 1636)
- Hon. Anne Calvert (born 9 October 1636 – died 6 May 1661)
- Hon. Mary Calvert (b. 30 November 1638 – on or before 24 September 1671)
- Hon. Elizabeth Calvert (born circa 1642 – died 16 January 1712)
- Hon. Frances Calvert

Lady Baltimore was buried at the St. John's Parish church in Tisbury, Wiltshire in England.
