= Cicely Compton, Lady Arundell of Wardour =

Cicely Arundell
- portrait attributed to Alexander Cooper
- Titles: Lady Arundell of Wardour
- Born: Cicely Compton; 1609/1610
- Died: 1675/1676
- Residence: Wardour Castle
- Noble family: Arundell family
- Spouses: Sir John Fermor; Henry Arundell
- Issue: Thomas Arundell; Henry Arundell; Cicely Arundell
- Father: Henry Compton
- Mother: Lady Cicely Sackville

Cicely, Lady Arundell of Wardour (née Compton, c. 1609/1610 – 24 March 1675/1676) was the wife of Henry Arundell, 3rd Baron Arundell of Wardour of Wardour Castle.

She was the daughter of the Hon. Sir Henry Compton KB, of Brambletye, Sussex and Cicely, daughter of Robert Sackville, 2nd Earl of Dorset. She married first Sir John Fermor, of Somerton, Oxfordshire and after his death married Baron Arundell.

They had three children:

- Hon Thomas Arundell, later 4th Baron Arundell of Wardour
- Hon Henry Arundell
- Hon Cicely Arundell, who became a nun in Rouen

She died on 24 March 1676 at the age of 66. She is buried with Baron Arundell in Tisbury, Wiltshire.
