= Tisbury Stone Circle and Henge =

Stone circle and henge in Wiltshire, England

Tisbury Stone Circle and Henge was a stone circle and henge in Tisbury, Wiltshire. Archaeologists believe that it was likely erected during the Bronze Age.

Tisbury Stone Circle and Henge was part of a tradition of stone circle construction that spread through much of Great Britain, Ireland, and Brittany between 3,300 and 900 BCE, during the Late Neolithic and Early Bronze Age. The stone circle tradition was accompanied by the construction of timber circles and earthen henges, reflecting a growing emphasis on circular monuments. The purpose of such rings is unknown, although archaeologists speculate that the stones represented supernatural entities for the circle's builders.

Nothing of the monument remains.

== Location ==
The site was 12 miles west/south-west of Stonehenge, and was positioned just north of the River Nadder. From the available descriptions, the Tisbury monuments appears to have combined a stone circle with a henge. The placement of an inhumation burial near the centre stone has also been found at other monuments in the British Isles, such as at the Longstone Rath henge in County Kildare, Ireland.

Nothing remains of the Tisbury Stone Circle in situ though a small decorative stone circle at Wardour Castle grotto incorporates three of the standing stones.

== Context ==
While the transition from the Early Neolithic to the Late Neolithic in the fourth and third millennia BCE saw much economic and technological continuity, there was a considerable change in the style of monuments erected, particularly in what is now southern and eastern England. By 3000 BCE, the long barrows, causewayed enclosures, and cursuses which had predominated in the Early Neolithic were no longer built, and had been replaced by circular monuments of various kinds. These include earthen henges, timber circles, and stone circles. Stone circles are found in most areas of Britain where stone is available, with the exception of the island's south-eastern corner. They are most densely concentrated in south-western Britain and on the north-eastern horn of Scotland, near Aberdeen. The tradition of their construction may have lasted for 2,400 years, from 3300 to 900 BCE, with the major phase of building taking place between 3000 and 1,300 BCE.

These stone circles typically show very little evidence of human visitation during the period immediately following their creation. This suggests that they were not sites used for rituals that left archaeologically visible evidence, but may have been deliberately left as "silent and empty monuments". The archaeologist Mike Parker Pearson suggests that in Neolithic Britain, stone was associated with the dead, and wood with the living. Other archaeologists have suggested that the stone might not represent ancestors, but rather other supernatural entities, such as deities.

In the area of modern Wiltshire, various stone circles were erected, the best known of which are Avebury and Stonehenge. All of the other examples are ruined, and in some cases have been destroyed. As noted by the archaeologist Aubrey Burl, these examples have left behind "only frustrating descriptions and vague positions". Most of the known Wiltshire examples were erected on low-lying positions in the landscape.
