= Thomas Arundell, 2nd Baron Arundell of Wardour =

English nobleman (c.1586–1643)

Thomas Arundell
- 2nd Baron Arundell of Wardour
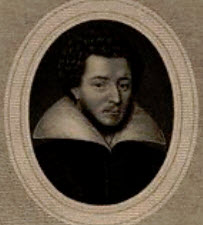
- Thomas Arundell, 2nd Baron Arundell of Wardour
- Born: c. 1586
- Died: 19 May 1643 (aged 56–57)
- Buried: Tisbury, Wiltshire
- Spouse: Blanche Somerset
- Issue: Henry Arundell, 3rd Baron Arundell of Wardour; Anne Arundell; Katherine Arundell
- Father: Thomas Arundell, 1st Baron Arundell of Wardour
- Mother: Mary Wriothesley

Thomas Arundell, 2nd Baron Arundell of Wardour (c. 1586 – 19 May 1643) was an English nobleman son of Thomas Arundell, 1st Baron Arundell of Wardour and Lady Mary Wriothesley.

== Life ==
He succeeded to the title of 2nd Baron Arundell of Wardour, County Wiltshire, on 7 November 1639. He was a devoted Royalist and joined the Royalist cause during the English Civil War, having raised a Regiment of Horse for the King. He was present at the Royalist victory at the Battle of Stratton (16 May 1643), but was mortally wounded in the engagement, and died three days later in Oxford, Oxfordshire, from the wounds received in action.

His residence, Wardour Castle in Wiltshire, whose defence he had been compelled to leave in the hands of his wife, had fallen to the Parliamentarians on 8 May 1643. He was buried at Tisbury, Wiltshire. His will (dated 7 January 1641/2 to 14 May 1643) was probated on 27 November 1648.

== Family ==
On 11 May 1607 (date of settlement for the marriage), he married Lady Blanche Somerset (1583 or c. 1584 - 28 October 1649), daughter of Edward Somerset, 4th Earl of Worcester. They had three children:

- Henry Arundell, 3rd Baron Arundell of Wardour (1607–1694), who succeeded him
- Anne Arundell, married Roger Vaughan
- Katherine Arundell (born c. 1614), married Francis Cornwallis, son of Sir Charles Cornwallis.

Peerage of England
Preceded by Thomas Arundell	Baron Arundell of Wardour; 1639–1643	Succeeded by Henry Arundell
