= Thomas Arundell, 1st Baron Arundell of Wardour =

English nobleman (c. 1560–1639)

Thomas Arundell
- 1st Baron Arundell of Wardour
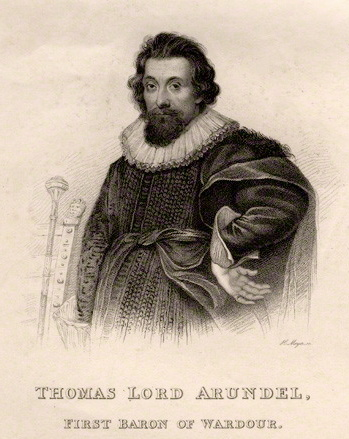
- Thomas Arundell, 1st Baron Arundell of Wardour
- Born: c. 1560
- Died: 7 November 1639 (aged 78–79); Wardour Castle, Wiltshire
- Buried: Tisbury, Wiltshire
- Spouses: Mary Wriothesley; Anne Philipson
- Issue: Thomas Arundell, 2nd Baron Arundell of Wardour; William Arundell; Elizabeth Mary Arundell; Matthew Arundell; Thomas Arundell; Frederick Arundell; Katherine Arundell; Mary Arundell; Anne Arundell; Frances Arundell; Margaret Arundell; Clare Arundell
- Father: Sir Matthew Arundell
- Mother: Margaret Willoughby

Thomas Arundell, 1st Baron Arundell of Wardour (c. 1560 – 7 November 1639) was the eldest son of Sir Matthew Arundell of Wardour Castle in Wiltshire (ca. 1532/1534 – 24 December 1598), and Margaret Willoughby, the daughter of Sir Henry Willoughby, of Wollaton, Nottinghamshire, and his wife Lady Anne Grey, the youngest daughter of Thomas Grey, 2nd Marquess of Dorset. He distinguished himself in battle against the Ottoman Turks in the service of the Emperor Rudolf II, and was created a Count of the Holy Roman Empire. His assumption of the title displeased Queen Elizabeth, who refused to recognize it, and imprisoned him in the Fleet Prison. In 1605 Arundell was created 1st Baron Arundell of Wardour. In the same year, he was briefly suspected of complicity in the Gunpowder Plot.

== Life ==
Sir Thomas Arundell (c. 1560 – 7 November 1639) was the eldest son of Sir Matthew Arundell of Wardour Castle in Wiltshire (ca. 1532/1534 – 24 December 1598), a member of the ancient family of Arundell of Cornwall, and Margaret Willoughby, the daughter of Sir Henry Willoughby, of Wollaton, Nottinghamshire, and his wife Lady Anne Grey, the youngest daughter of Thomas Grey, 2nd Marquess of Dorset. His father inherited extensive former monastic lands, and served in a number of administrative capacities, including high sheriff, custos rotulorum, and Deputy Lieutenant of Dorset. In her youth his mother served for several years in the household of Princess Elizabeth at Hatfield. Arundell's paternal grandparents were Sir Thomas Arundell (executed on 26 February 1552) and Margaret Howard (ca. 1515 – 10 October 1571), sister of Queen Katherine Howard. According to Agnes Strickland, Margaret Howard, Lady Arundel was a Lady Attendant to Katherine Howard, her sister the Queen.

In 1580 Arundell was imprisoned for his fervent Roman Catholicism. By licence dated 18 June 1585 he married Mary (c. 1567 – 1607), the daughter of Henry Wriothesley, 2nd Earl of Southampton, and Mary, the daughter of Anthony Browne, 1st Viscount Montague. Arundell's wife was the sister of Henry Wriothesley, 3rd Earl of Southampton. Arundell was fond of Southampton as a youth, writing to Lord Burghley when Southampton was 15 that 'Your Lordship doth love him', and that 'My [own] love and care of this young Earl enticeth me'.

Although a Roman Catholic throughout his life, Arundell demonstrated his loyalty to the Crown in 1588 by subscribing £100 towards the defeat of the Spanish Armada.

According to Akrigg, Arundell was 'gifted and scholarly', but by the time he had reached his 30s had failed to find any outlet for his talents and had 'sunk into a melancholic existence', living a 'studious solitary life' at the Wriothesley estates in Hampshire or in the family apartments at Southampton House in London. In 1595 Arundell's father agreed to provide him with horses and £1100 to leave England and serve in the Imperial forces against the Turks. The Queen allegedly recommended him to the Holy Roman Emperor Rudolf II. On 7 September 1595 Arundell stormed the breach at Gran, replacing the Turkish standard with the Imperial eagle. In recognition of his service, Arundell was made a Count of the Holy Roman Empire on 14 December 1595, and became known as 'the Valiant'.

Against his father's wishes, Arundell took his leave of the Imperial court in mid-December and returned to England. His ship was caught in a storm and wrecked near Aldeburgh on the Suffolk coast. He lost all his belongings in the wreck, and counted himself fortunate to stand 'extreamely cold & wett upon the shore'. His assumption of a foreign title created jealousy among his fellow peers in England, and was resented by his father, who objected to his superior rank and disinherited him. The Queen was furious and threatened to make him renounce the title. She committed Arundell to the Fleet Prison, remarking that 'I would not have a sheep branded with another man's mark'. Arundell remained under arrest until mid-April 1597, when he was freed, but forbidden to appear at court. In the following months he made frequent appeals to the Queen, but was still denied her favour, and again fell prey to depression. In July his father grudgingly allowed Arundell to live with him at Wardour provided that he not bring his wife with him.

In 1597 Arundell was arrested on vague suspicions of Catholic espionage. The authorities searched his chamber but could prove nothing against him, and released him to his father's custody on the grounds of his wife's failing health. Arundell's father 'insisted on behaving as a jailer', and Arundell was eventually transferred elsewhere.

Arundell succeeded his father in December 1598. In 1601, his brother-in-law, Southampton, was on trial for his part in the Essex Rebellion of 8 February 1601. Attempting to distance himself from Southampton's misfortune, Arundell wrote a 'treacherous' letter on 18 February to Sir Robert Cecil, protesting that Southampton's 'ears were hardened against wholesome counsel, for which I thought good to estrange myself from him'.

In March 1605 Arundell and Southampton sent Captain George Weymouth to found a colony in Virginia. The colonists arrived back in England in mid-July. According to the account written by James Rosier, these were the colonists 'we were to leave in the Country by their agreement with my Lord the Right Honourable Count Arundell'. According to Akrigg, Arundell figures much more prominently in Rosier's account than Southampton, leading Akrigg to conclude that 'the whole voyage may best be regarded as a first attempt to found an American colony that would be an asylum for English Catholics', and that Arundell, who in 1596 had planned a venture to the East Indies, was the principal impetus behind the Weymouth voyage.

On 4 May 1605 King James I created him Baron Arundell of Wardour. Appointed by the new King as colonel of the English regiment serving the Archduke in Spanish Flanders, Arundell made an unauthorized crossing to the continent in September 1605, disobeying royal orders and incurring the King's anger. A few months later he was named by Guy Fawkes under torture, and briefly suspected of complicity in the Gunpowder Plot.

In 1607 Arundell's eldest son and heir, Thomas, married Blanche Somerset, the daughter of the Earl of Worcester, without Arundell's consent, resulting in an estrangement between father and son. Arundell's first wife, Mary, died a few weeks after the marriage. On 1 July 1608 Arundell remarried. His second wife was Anne Philipson, the daughter of Miles Philipson, of Crook, Westmorland, and Barbara Sandys, sister of Francis Sandys, of Conishead, Lancashire. She died on 28 June 1637 at Lennox House in London, and was buried on 4 July 1637 at Tisbury, Wiltshire.

During the 1630s Arundell engaged in 'acrimonious religious disputes' with the Bishop of Durham, and in 1637 attempted to sell Wardour Castle to the King. He died at Wardour on 7 November 1639, and was buried at Tisbury.

== Marriages and issue ==
Arundell married firstly Mary Wriothesley, by whom he had two sons and a daughter:

1. Thomas Arundell, 2nd Baron Arundell of Wardour (c. 1586– 19 May 1643), who succeeded him.
2. William Arundell of Horningsham, Wiltshire, who married Mary Browne, eldest daughter of Anthony Maria Browne, 2nd Viscount Montague (d.1629), by Jane Sackville, daughter of Thomas Sackville, 1st Earl of Dorset. Before her marriage to William Arundell she was the wife of William Paulet (d.1621), Lord St. John, eldest son of William Paulet, 4th Marquess of Winchester.
3. Elizabeth Mary Arundell (wife of Sir John Philpot).

Arundell's first wife, Mary Wriothesley, was buried at Tisbury, Wiltshire, on 27 June 1607.

Arundell married secondly, Anne Philipson, third daughter of Miles Philipson of Crook, Westmorland, by whom he had:

1. Matthew, (1609–1620) was thought in a theory of the early 1900s to have emigrated to Virginia and taken the name Howard, which theory was popularized by Harry Wright Newman in his 1933 first edition of Anne Arundel Gentry. Newman later retracted that in his second edition (1970) stating, "In 1925 when research was being conducted on the Howards, I lent an ear to the story that he was Mathew Howard whose legal name was Arundel, but changed it to Howard for political reasons. Furthermore, he was descended from an immediate line of the Duke of Norfolk. See 'Anne Arundel Gentry', 1st Ed. All claims since have been found to have little foundation." The theory that Matthew Arundell was Matthew Howard was disproved in 1939, by showing that Matthew Arundell was buried on 2 June 1620 in London.
2. Thomas
3. Frederick
4. Katherine (wife of Ralph Eure)
5. Mary (wife of Sir John Somerset) (and namesake for Somerset County in the Province of Maryland, erected 1666)
6. Ann, (namesake for Anne Arundel County, erected 1650). She later married Cecilius Calvert, the second Lord Baltimore, (1605–1675) in 1628 at age 13. In 1632, after the death of his father George, (1579–1632), the first Lord Baltimore, and late loyal friend and Secretary of State, King Charles I renewed the grant originally made to his father, with the proprietorship of Maryland after an earlier unsuccessful colony of Avalon in Newfoundland. Anne Arundel County (misspelt), erected 1650 in the Province and later the State of Maryland is named after Calvert's (second Lord Baltimore's) wife, Ann Arundell. She was born in 1615 at Arundel Castle, gave birth to nine children (three survive to adulthood, with three sons and six daughters) before her death at age 34 on 23 July 1649, and was also buried at Tisbury, Wiltshire.
7. Frances (wife of John Talbot, 10th Earl of Shrewsbury)
8. Margaret (wife of John Fortescue)
9. Clare (wife of Humphrey Weld).

Peerage of England
New creation	Baron Arundell of Wardour; 1605–1639	Succeeded by Thomas Arundell
German nobility of the Holy Roman Empire
New creation	Count Arundell of Wardour; 1595–1639	Succeeded by Thomas Arundell
