= Matthew Arundell =

16th c English gentleman, alias Howard, MP, and relation of Howard & Culpeper families

Arms of Arundell of Wardour Castle

Sir Matthew Arundell of Wardour Castle in Wiltshire (c. 1534/1535 – 24 December 1598) was an English gentleman, landowner, and member of parliament in the West of England.

From a family of known Roman Catholic recusants, Arundell outwardly conformed to the Church of England, but is believed to have been a crypto-Catholic.

== Background ==
A member of the ancient knightly family of Arundell of Cornwall, Arundell was the son of Sir Thomas Arundell (attainted and executed in 1552) and of Margaret Howard (died 1571), a sister of Queen Katherine Howard. His maternal grandparents were Lord Edmund Howard (died 1539), the third son of Thomas Howard, 2nd Duke of Norfolk, and Joyce Culpeper (c. 1480–1531). His great aunt Elizabeth, Countess of Wiltshire, was the mother of Anne Boleyn, who was thus the first cousin of Arundell's mother as well as being the mother of Queen Elizabeth I. He was a descendant of the 11th century landowner Roger de Arundell, who possessed a substantial estate of twenty-eight manors in Wiltshire and Dorset at the Domesday Book survey.

== Life ==
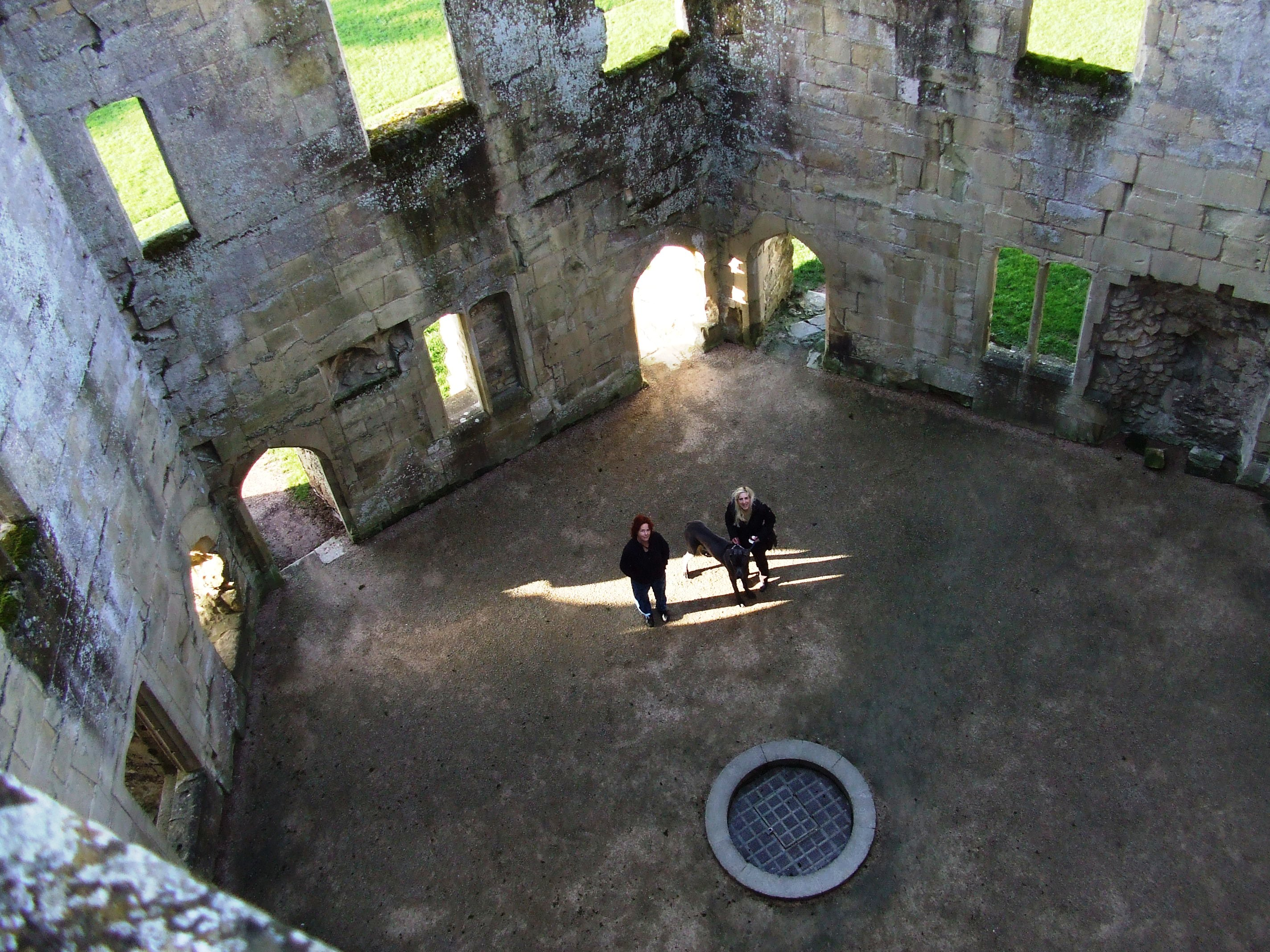
Present-day ruins of Wardour Castle

Arundell had a younger brother, Charles, and two sisters, Dorothy and Jane.

According to Agnes Strickland, his mother Margaret Howard, Lady Arundel was a Lady Attendant to Katherine Howard, her sister the Queen.

Little is known of their early lives, except that after the execution of their father in 1552 their mother took her children to live in the Holy Roman Empire, where the family used the name of Howard. For this reason, Arundell is sometimes referred to as Matthew Arundell-Howard. In 1554, two years after his father's death, when he was about twenty-one, the Arundells were "restored in blood", meaning that their father's attainder was reversed so far as it affected them, and Arundell gradually succeeded in regaining most of his father's lost estates in Dorset and Wiltshire.

Arundell had been contracted to marry Katherine, one of the daughters of Thomas Wriothesley, 1st Earl of Southampton, but in the event she married Sir Thomas Cornwallis. In 1559 Arundell married Margaret Willoughby, a daughter of Sir Henry Willoughby, of Wollaton, Nottinghamshire, and wife Lady Anne Grey, the youngest daughter of Thomas Grey, 2nd Marquess of Dorset, and second wife Margaret Wotton. As a child Margaret and her sister and brother had been taken in by Henry Grey, 3rd Marquess of Dorset, and his wife, Frances Brandon, after their father was slain in the suppression of Kett's Rebellion in 1549, and had grown up with Dorset's daughters, Lady Jane Grey, Lady Katherine Grey, and Lady Mary Grey. Margaret was present at Mary Grey's secret marriage on 16 July 1565 to the Queen's serjeant porter, Thomas Keyes, and was bequeathed a tankard of gold and silver in Mary Grey's will. As a young lady Margaret had previously served in the household of Princess Elizabeth at Hatfield House.

Sir Thomas Arundell's main seat, Wardour Castle, had been held by knight service of the Earl of Pembroke, so had escheated to Pembroke in 1552. In 1570 Arundell was able to buy it back to live in, together with the manor of Sutton Mandeville, and the next year Lord Pembroke granted him the site of Shaftesbury Abbey. As well as living at Wardour, the Arundells kept a town house in London. They had two sons.

Arundell served in several official capacities, including as Sheriff, custos rotulorum, and Deputy Lieutenant of Dorset. Apart from his administrative tasks in the West of England, where his estates lay, Arundell was twice a Member of Parliament. The borough of Shaftesbury in Dorset sent him to sit as one of its burgesses in the House of Commons in the parliament of 1555. In 1563 he was elected as the knight of the shire for Breconshire in Wales. At Westminster he followed the powerful William Cecil, and in 1574 was knighted by his cousin Queen Elizabeth.

His brother Charles Arundell (died 1587) was openly a recusant and fled the country after the Babington Plot. In the 1580s he was seen as a leader of the English Roman Catholic exiles in France. Arundell's own elder son was imprisoned as a suspected Imperial spy, but Arundell himself conformed to the Church of England. In 1588, Arundel was one of a small number of knights considered for a peerage on account of "great possessions". The following year he was appointed a Deputy Lieutenant for Wiltshire.

Sir John Harington (1561–1612), a courtier often claimed as the inventor of the water closet, reported an occasion at Wardour in the early 1590s at which a conversation about sanitation first prompted his interest in the subject. Apart from Harington, those present were Arundell and his son Thomas, Thomas's wife, Mary, her brother Henry Wriothesley, 3rd Earl of Southampton, and Sir Henry Danvers. However, fifty years later Wardour Castle still depended on medieval garderobes as privies.

In his final months Arundell was in pain from bladder stones. Following his death on 24 December 1598 he was buried at the parish church of Tisbury. In his Will, proved on 6 February 1598/99, he gave £2,000 – at the time an enormous sum, equal to almost twice the annual income of his more powerful connection the Earl of Southampton – to the poor. As Custos Rotulorum of Dorset he was succeeded by Sir Walter Raleigh.

== Posterity ==
Arundell's son Thomas distinguished himself in battle against the Turks in the service of the Emperor Rudolf II, who created him a Count of the Holy Roman Empire. This foreign title annoyed Queen Elizabeth, who in 1597 imprisoned Thomas Arundell in the Fleet as a suspected Roman Catholic spy, but nothing could be proved against him and Thomas was soon released into Arundell's custody. In 1605, some years after Arundell's death in 1598, his elder son was summoned to the House of Lords by King James I as Baron Arundell of Wardour and was briefly suspected of being one of the Gunpowder Plot conspirators.

The title survived until the death of John Arundell, 16th Baron Arundell of Wardour (1907–1944), when it became extinct.

== Sources ==
- Nelson, Alan H. (2003). Monstrous Adversary: The Life of Edward de Vere, 17th Earl of Oxford. Liverpool University Press. ISBN 9780853236788.
