= Wardour Castle =

14th-century castle in Wiltshire, England

Old Wardour Castle
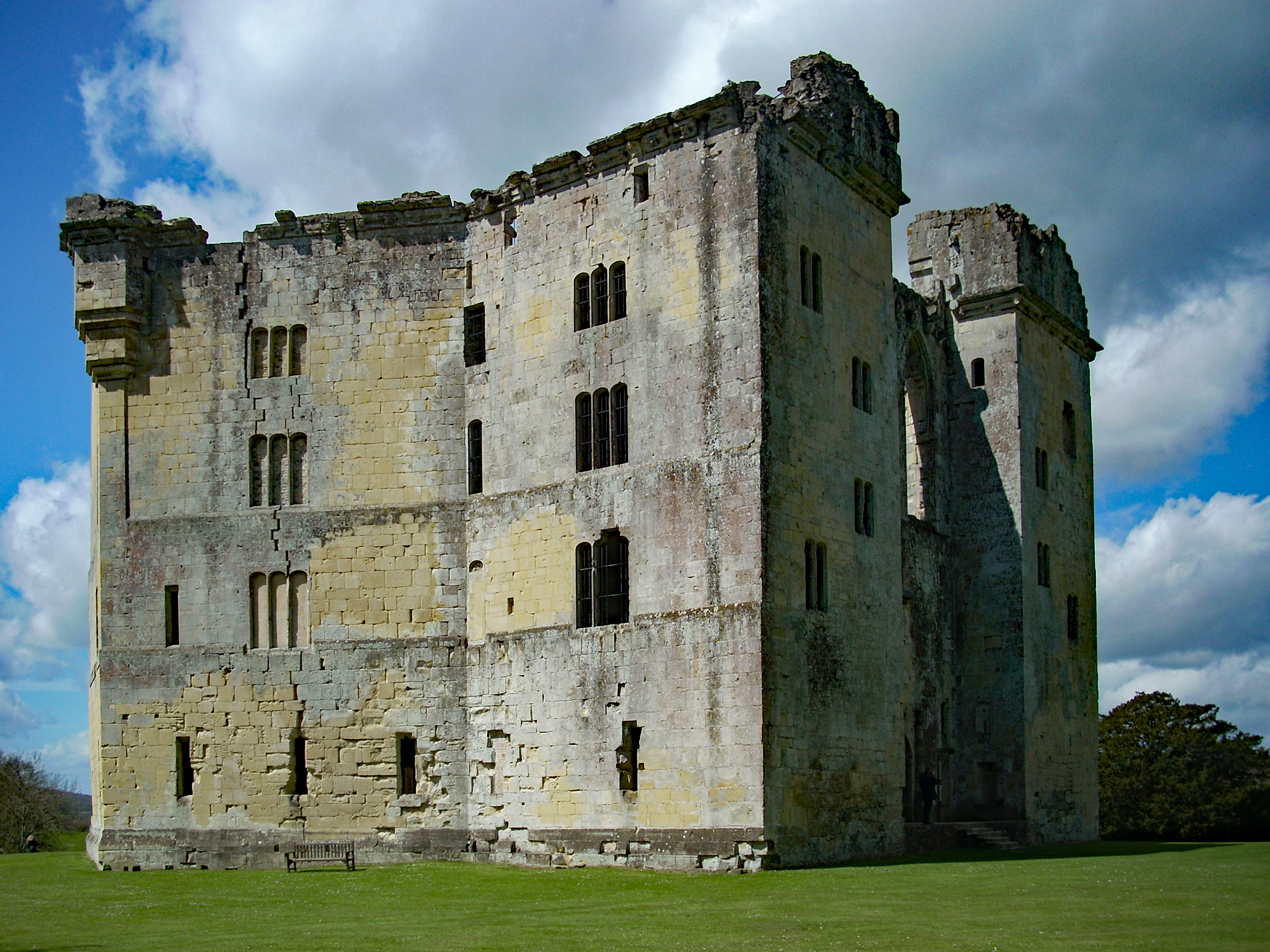
- Ruins of Old Wardour Castle

- Location within Wiltshire
- 51°02′11″N 2°05′20″W
- Type: Castle
- Location: Donhead St. Andrew, Tisbury
- OS grid reference: ST9387126334

History
- Built: 14th century

Site notes
- Area: Wiltshire
- Architect: William Wynford
- Owner: English Heritage

Listed Building – Grade I
- Official name: Old Wardour Castle
- Designated: 25 October 1951
- Reference no.: 1183429

National Register of Historic Parks and Gardens
- Official name: Wardour Castle and Old Wardour Castle
- Designated: 1 September 1987
- Reference no.: 1000507

Wardour Castle or Old Wardour Castle is a ruined 14th-century castle at Wardour, on the boundaries of the civil parishes of Tisbury and Donhead St Andrew in the English county of Wiltshire, about 15 miles (24 km) west of Salisbury. The castle was built in the 1390s, came into the ownership of the Arundells in the 16th century, and was rendered uninhabitable in 1643 and 1644 during the Civil War. A Grade I listed building, it is managed by English Heritage and open to the public.

== History ==
=== Construction and design ===
In the 1300s, the land on which the castle was built was owned by the St Martin family until Sir Lawrence de St Martin died in 1385. Later in that year the land was acquired by John, the fifth Baron Lovell.

In 1392 or 1393, Baron Lovell was granted permission by King Richard II to build a castle on the site. It was constructed using locally quarried Tisbury greensand, and the master mason was William Wynford. The design was inspired by the hexagonal (six-sided) castles then in fashion in parts of the Continent, particularly in France (with similarities being noted to the château de Concressault); but its own design is unique in Britain. The inclusion of several self-contained guest suites was also unique in Britain at that time.

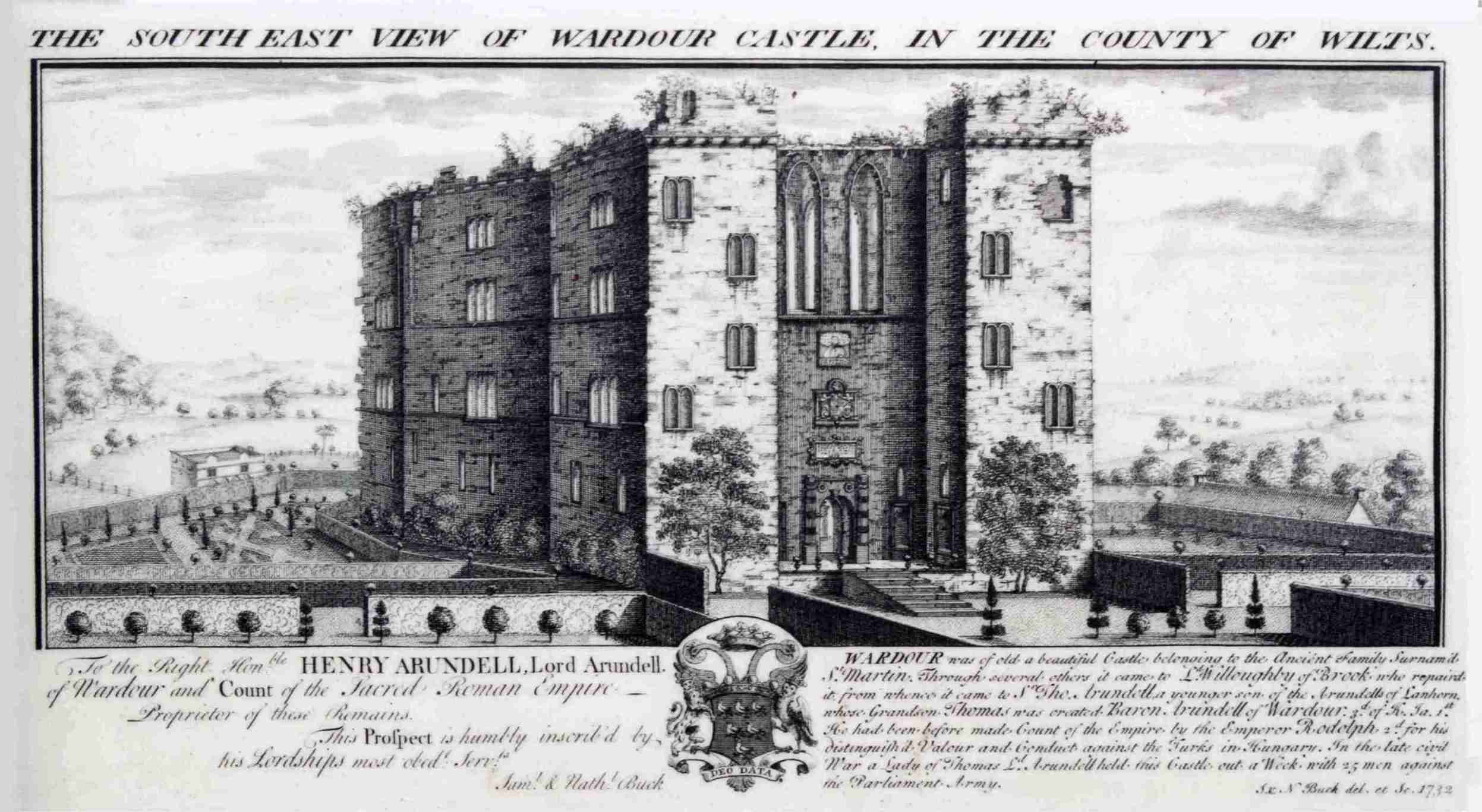
1732 engraving of the castle

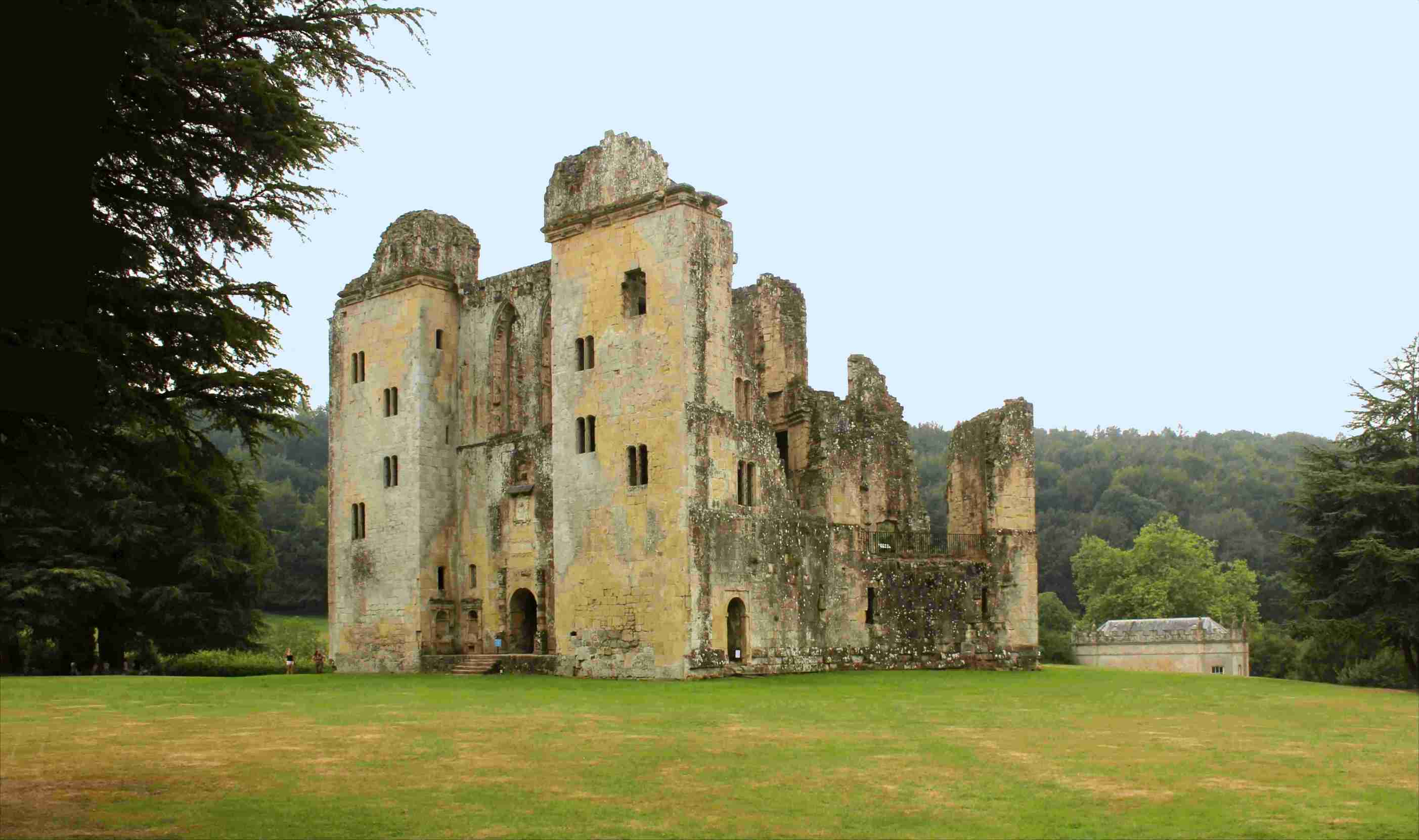
Wardour Castle today from the north, showing the main entrance and the smaller banqueting hall on the right of the main building

=== Arundells ===
After the fall of the Lovell family following their support of the Lancastrian cause during the Wars of the Roses, the castle was confiscated in 1461 and passed through several owners until bought by Sir Thomas Arundell of Lanherne in 1544. The Arundells were an ancient and prominent Cornish family, the principal branches of which were seated at the manors of Lanherne, Trerice, Tolverne and Menadarva in Cornwall. The family held several estates in Wiltshire.

The castle was confiscated when Sir Thomas – a staunch Roman Catholic – was executed for treason in 1552, but in 1570 was bought back by his son, Sir Matthew Arundell, later a Sheriff and Custos Rotulorum of Dorset. Arundell greatly altered the castle, with windows being enlarged and classical doorways and niches being added. The work would likely have been completed by around 1578, since this is the year inscribed above the entrance.

=== Civil War ===
The Arundells, led by Thomas Arundell, 1st Baron Arundell of Wardour, subsequently became known as some of the most active of the Roman Catholic landowners in England at the time of the Reformation; they were naturally Royalists in the Civil War. During that conflict, Thomas Arundell, 2nd Baron Arundell of Wardour, was away from home on the King's business and had instructed his wife, Lady Blanche Arundell, aged 61, to defend the castle with a garrison of 25 trained fighting men.

On 2 May 1643 Sir Edward Hungerford, with 1,300 men of the Parliamentarian army, demanded admittance to search for Royalists. He was refused and laid siege, setting about the walls with guns and mines. After five days the castle was threatened with complete destruction. Lady Arundell agreed to a surrender, and the castle was placed under the command of Colonel Edmund Ludlow.

Lord Arundell having died of his wounds after the Battle of Stratton that same month, Henry 3rd Lord Arundell, the son of Thomas and Blanche, brought a Royalist force to reclaim the castle. By November 1643 he had blockaded Wardour, and after mining the walls blew up much of it, obliging the Parliamentary garrison to surrender in March 1644.

=== Replacement by New Wardour Castle ===
The family slowly recovered power through the English Commonwealth and the Glorious Revolution, until the eighth Baron, Henry Arundell, borrowed sufficient funds to finance rebuilding. This was done by the prominent Palladian architect James Paine, who built New Wardour Castle some distance to the north-west, leaving Wardour Old Castle as an ornamental feature.

In stylistic terms, the "New Castle" is not a castle at all, but a symmetrical neoclassical country house with a main block built around a central staircase hall and two flanking wings. Paine integrated the ruins of the Old Castle into the surrounding parkland, intending it to be viewed as a romantic ruin.

== Characteristics of Old Wardour ==
=== Front door and entrance ===
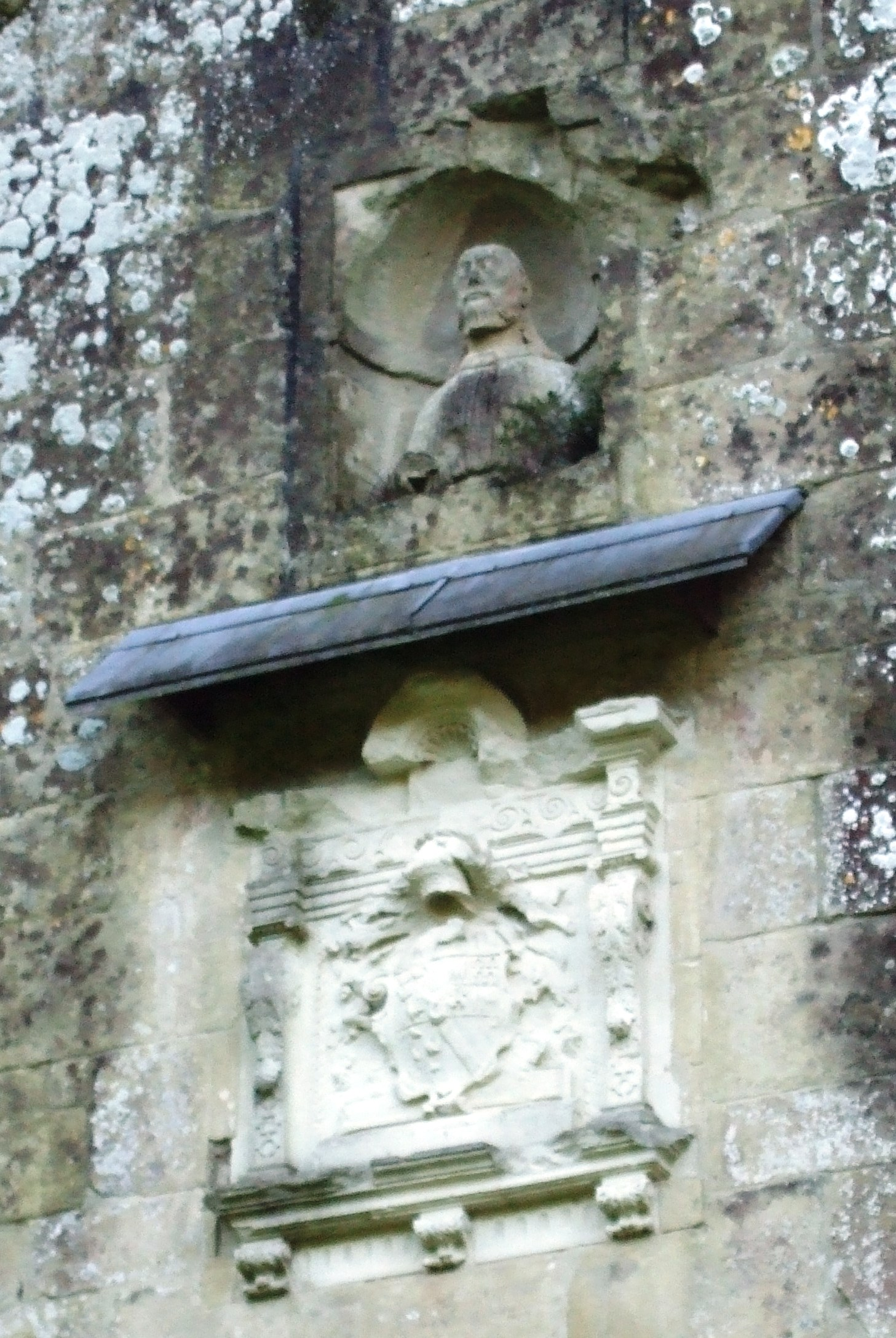
Coat of arms and head of Christ over the main entrance

The castle's ground level was altered around the 18th century.

In the Middle Ages, the ground sloped away more steeply than today so that the building stood at the top of a low ridge of land. As usual with mediaeval castles, the approach to the main door was protected by a deep ditch crossed by a drawbridge, with a portcullis inside the doorway.

Between the towers at the level of the battlements are the remains of a projecting gallery which would have been used to defend the front entrance.

Above the portal over the front entrance is the Arundell coat-of-arms and a description of the Arundell's possession of Wardour, erected by Sir Matthew Arundell in 1578 to celebrate his recovery of the property after the family lost it when Sir Thomas Arundell was executed in 1552. Above the coat of arms is the head of Christ in a niche with the inscription Sub nomine tuo stet genus et domus.

=== Central courtyard ===
In the 1570s, most of the original medieval windows and doors would have been replaced. In the centre of this interior courtyard, there is a well. Evidence gathered from other castles from the same era suggests that there would have been an elaborate and impressive roof over the well, carved and painted with the emblems of the Lovells and the Arundells.

In 1644 when the south-west side of the castle was blown up during the Civil War, the courtyard changed from a dark and claustrophobic place to a light, spacious one. It was in the shape of a hexagon, surrounded by four or five storeys.

=== Great Hall ===
At the top of the stairs leading from the courtyard, any medieval visitor would have found themselves in a passageway that, on the left, led into the great hall behind a wooden screen with arched openings. This room was the formal heart of the castle, where the whole household would meet for feasts and special occasions. The walls were covered in rich fabrics that concealed machinery that controlled the two portcullises.

In the 1570s, Matthew Arundell refurbished the great hall. A new musicians' gallery was built above the wooden entrance screen. The fireplace was reshaped and new wooden panels were put in place of the wall hangings and banners. The doorway leading from the great hall into the lobby was also redesigned. The tall windows and the old wooden roof were retained, and it is thought that this was to preserve some elements of Lord Lovell's castle.

=== Lobby ===
The lobby was a narrow room which was used to entertain guests with sweetmeats after the meal while the tables were being cleared in the great hall to create space for dancing. Such spaces were popular features of medieval houses.

In the 1570s Matthew Arundell had the room fitted with new fireplaces and altered the stairs in the north tower at the same time, to give a more private approach to the upper rooms.

=== Upper rooms ===
Today, very little remains of the upper rooms, which once would have been the most inviting part of the castle. Like the great hall, they were high rooms with intricate wooden roofs. Each room would have had two tall windows looking out upon the landscape and a third looking into the courtyard.

By 1605, the upper rooms had been converted to a gallery, a long room with many windows, as was popular in the upper floors of Elizabethan houses.

=== Banqueting House ===
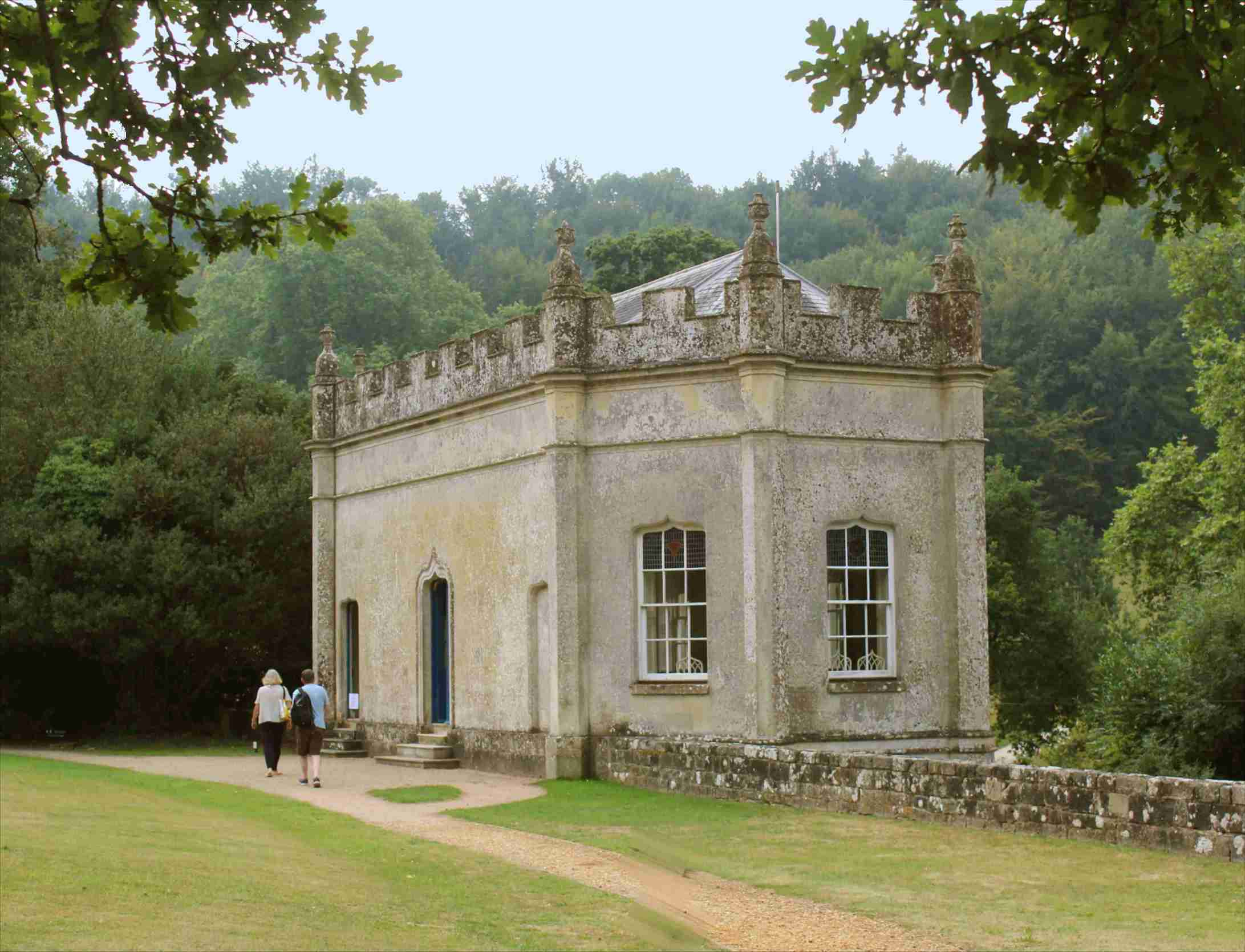
Banqueting House SW of main building

The Banqueting House was built between 1773 and 1774 as a place to entertain visitors. The architect was probably Capability Brown. The Banqueting House is now (2023) used as an exhibition centre.

=== Grotto ===
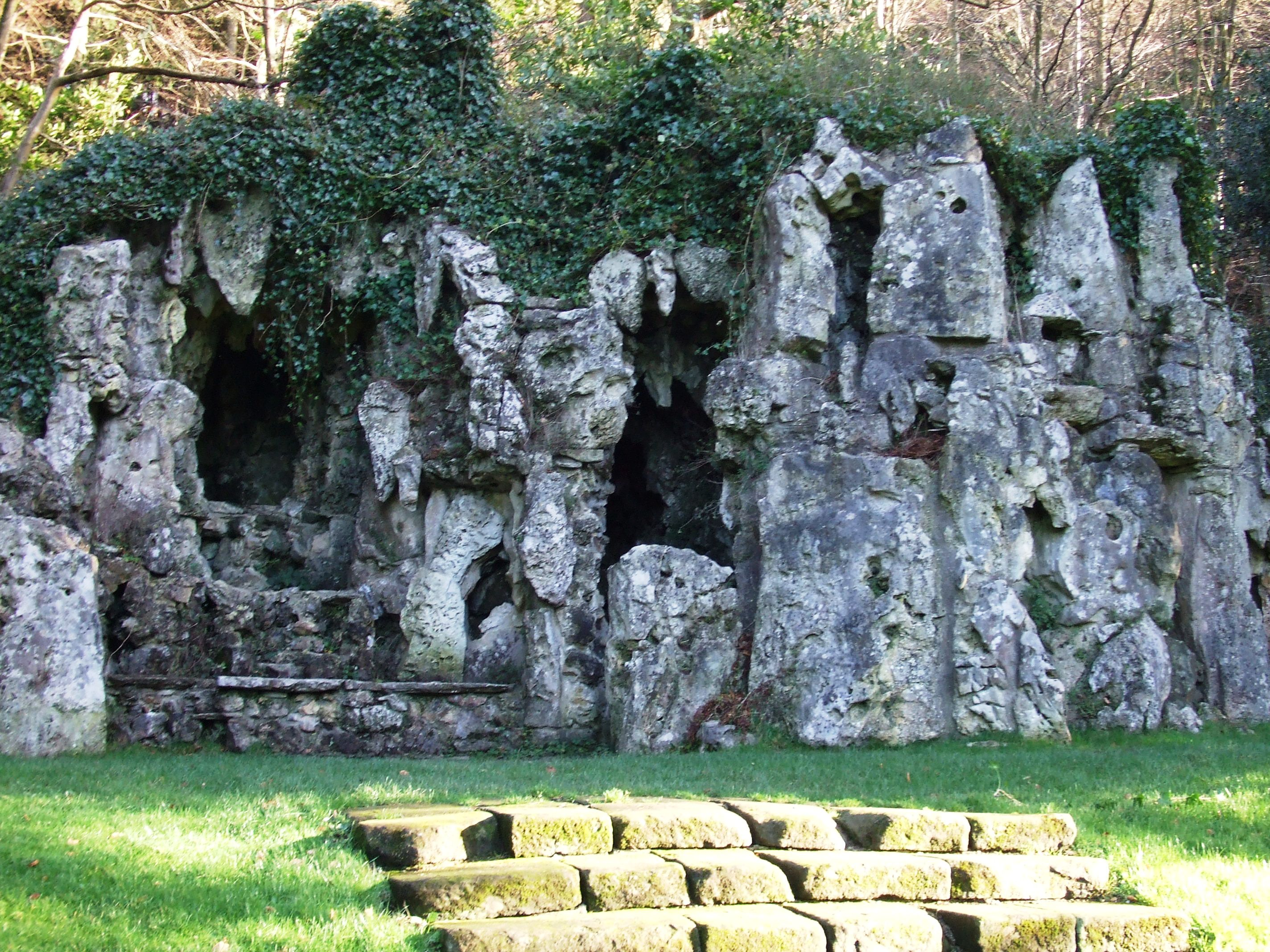
The grotto

The grotto was built in 1792 by Josiah Lane of Tisbury utilising stones from the castle ruins. In addition to the grotto, a small stone circle incorporates three standing stones, removed from the now-vanished stone circle at Tisbury was created nearby.

== In popular culture ==
The castle, including the grotto on the north side of its grounds, appeared in the 1991 Kevin Costner feature Robin Hood: Prince of Thieves.

The cover of Sting's album Ten Summoner's Tales was photographed inside Wardour Castle.

== See also ==
- Castles in Great Britain and Ireland
- List of castles in England

== Gallery ==
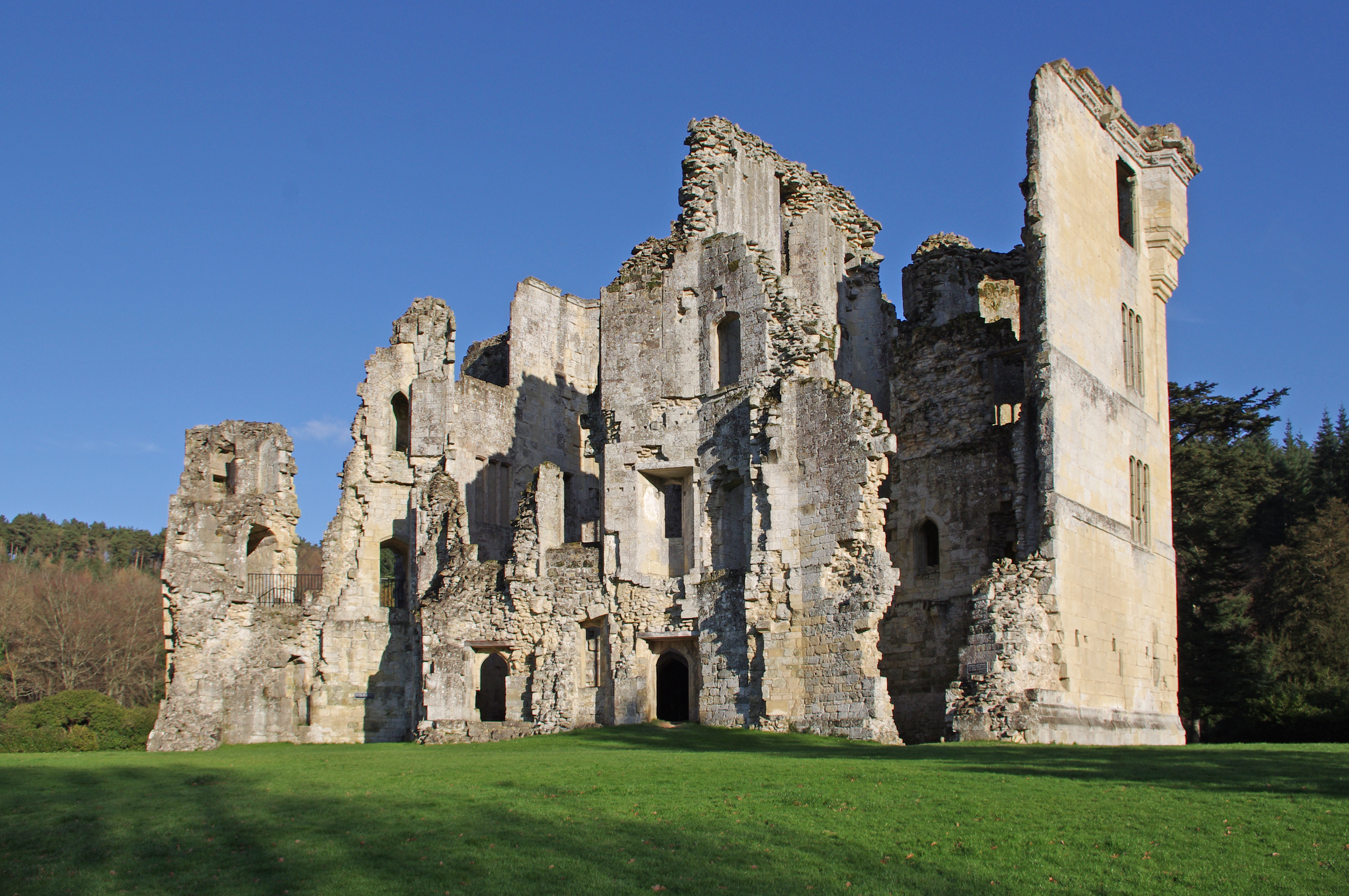
Old Wardour Castle ruins

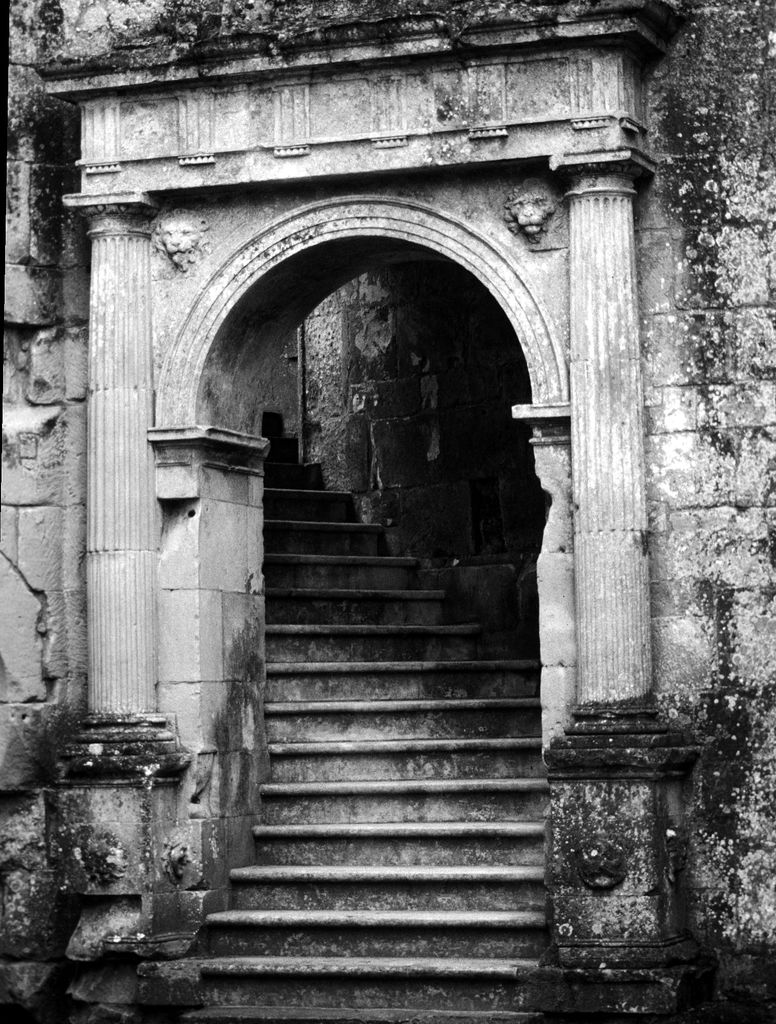
Interior of Old Wardour Castle.

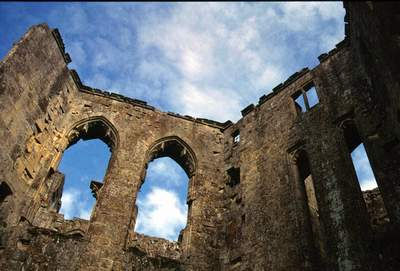
View from inside Old Wardour Castle.

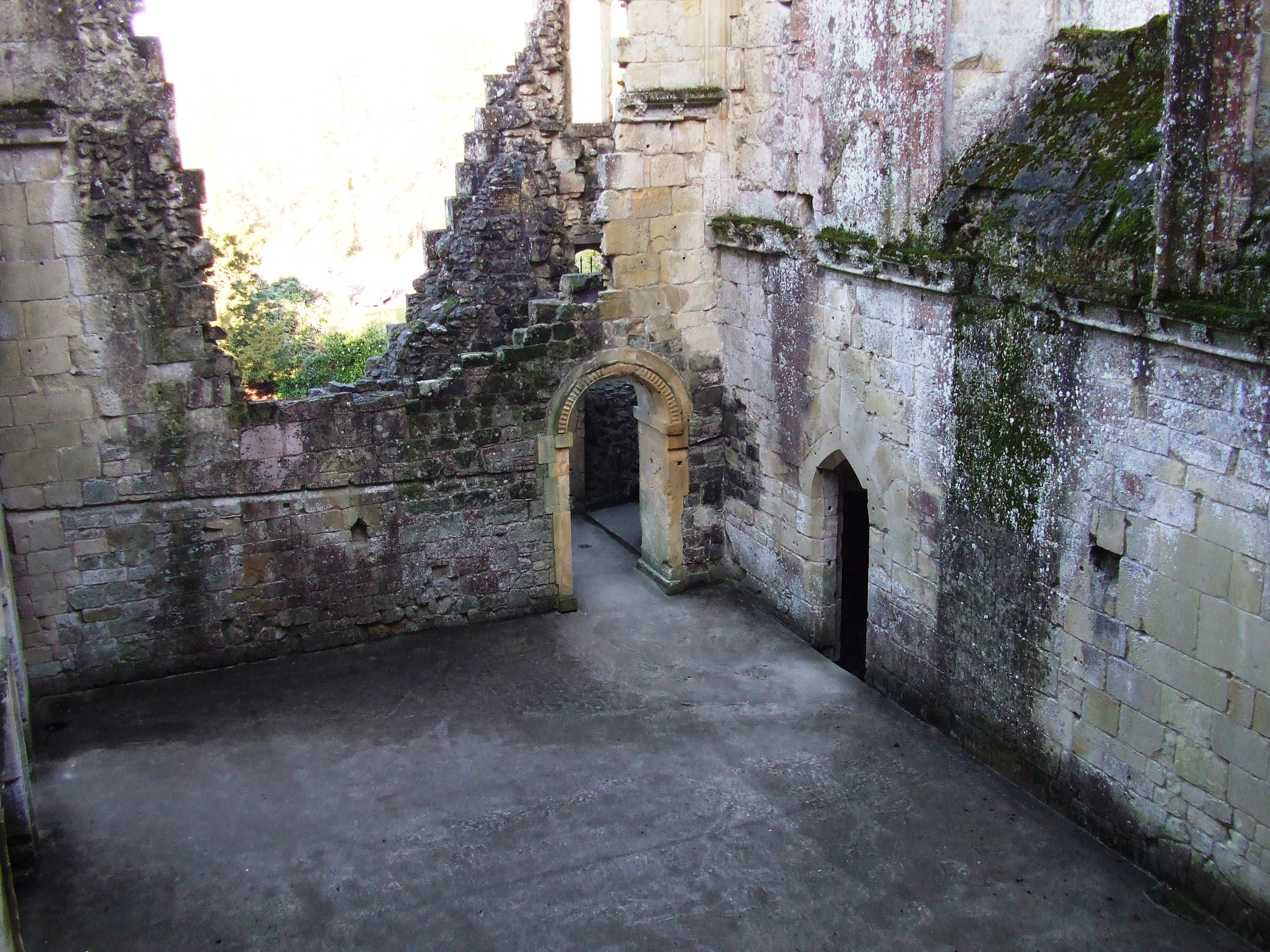
Interior Great Hall

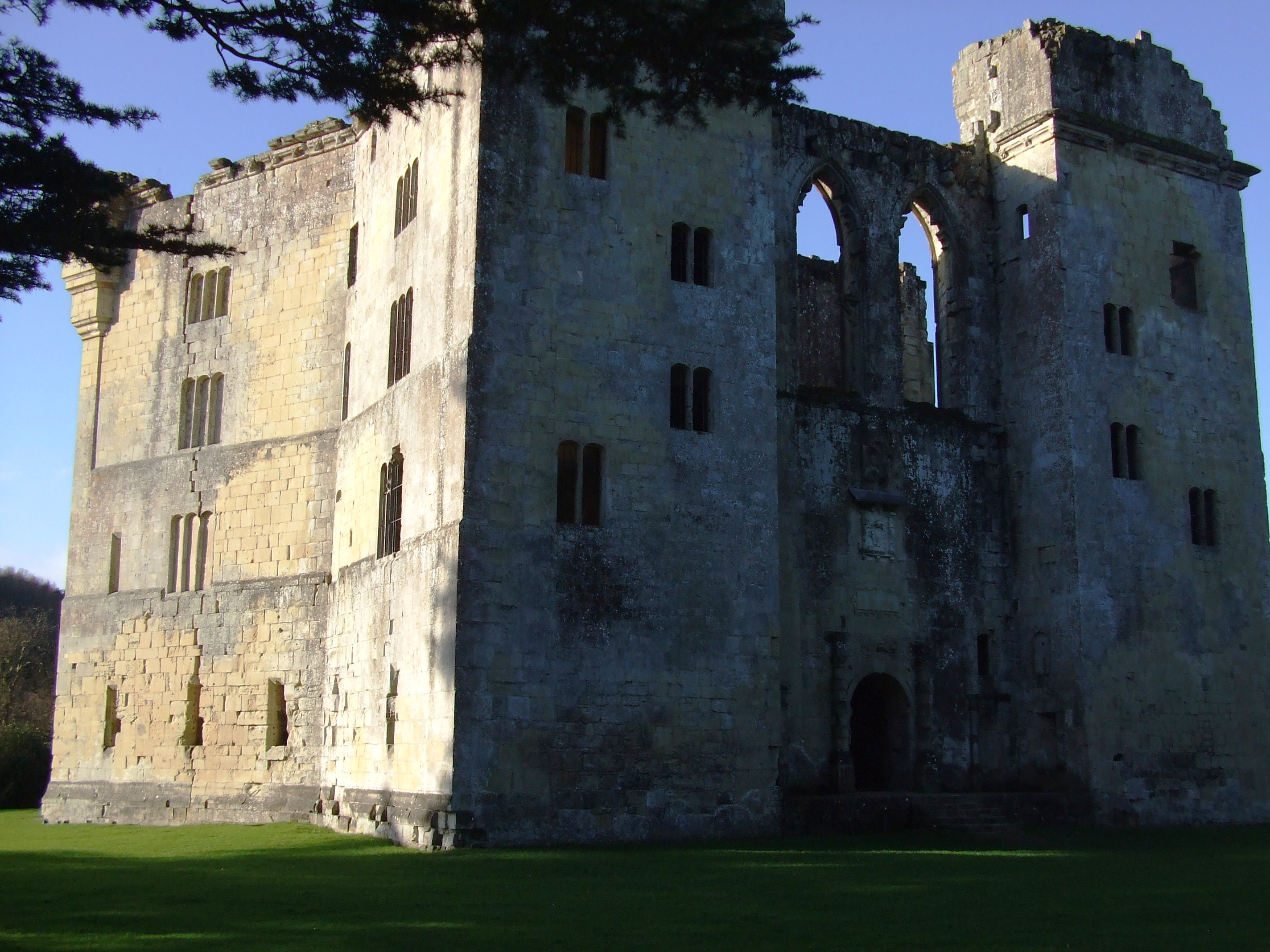
Exterior

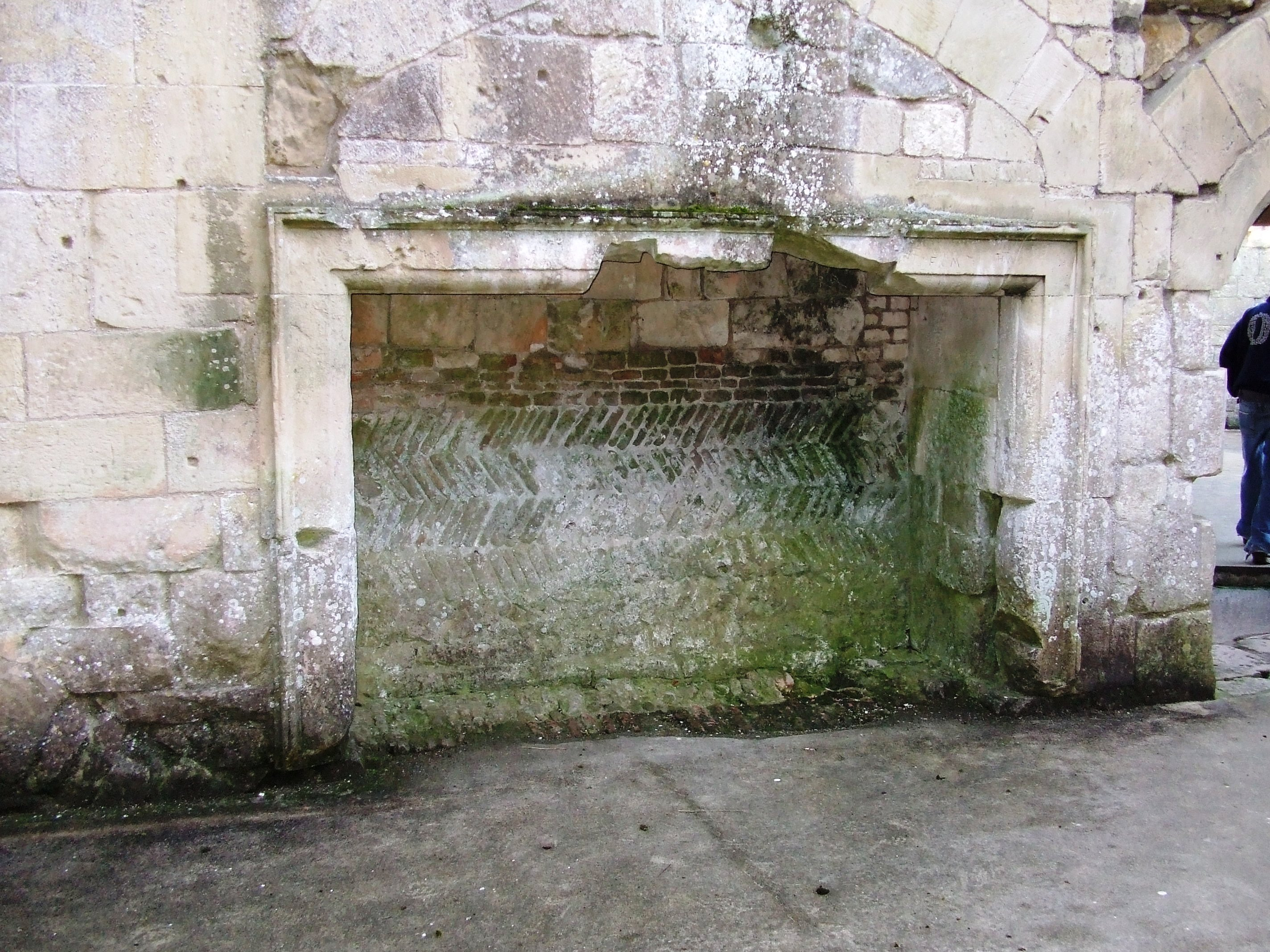
Fireplace

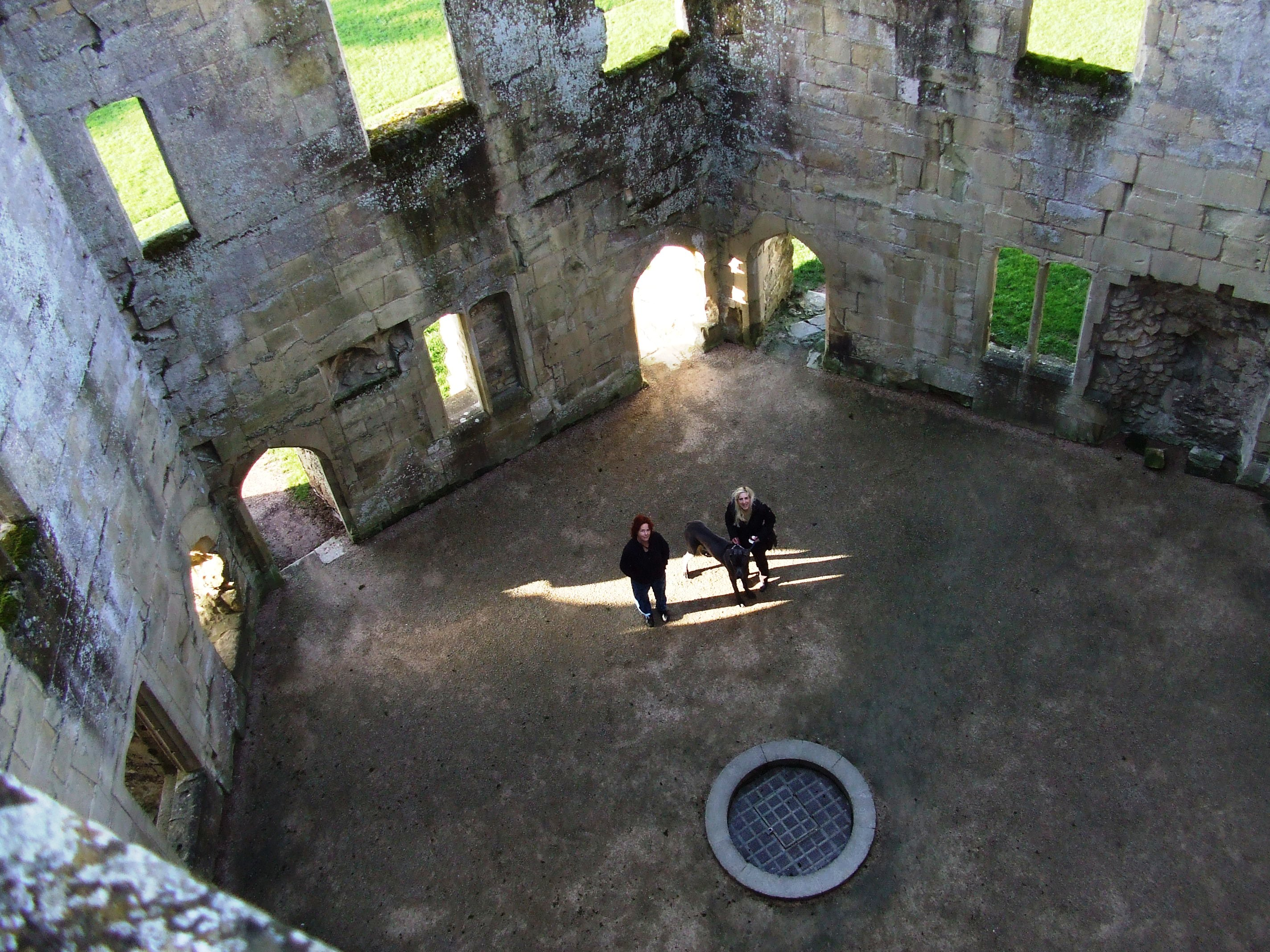
Hexagonal central courtyard & well taken from the 2nd floor

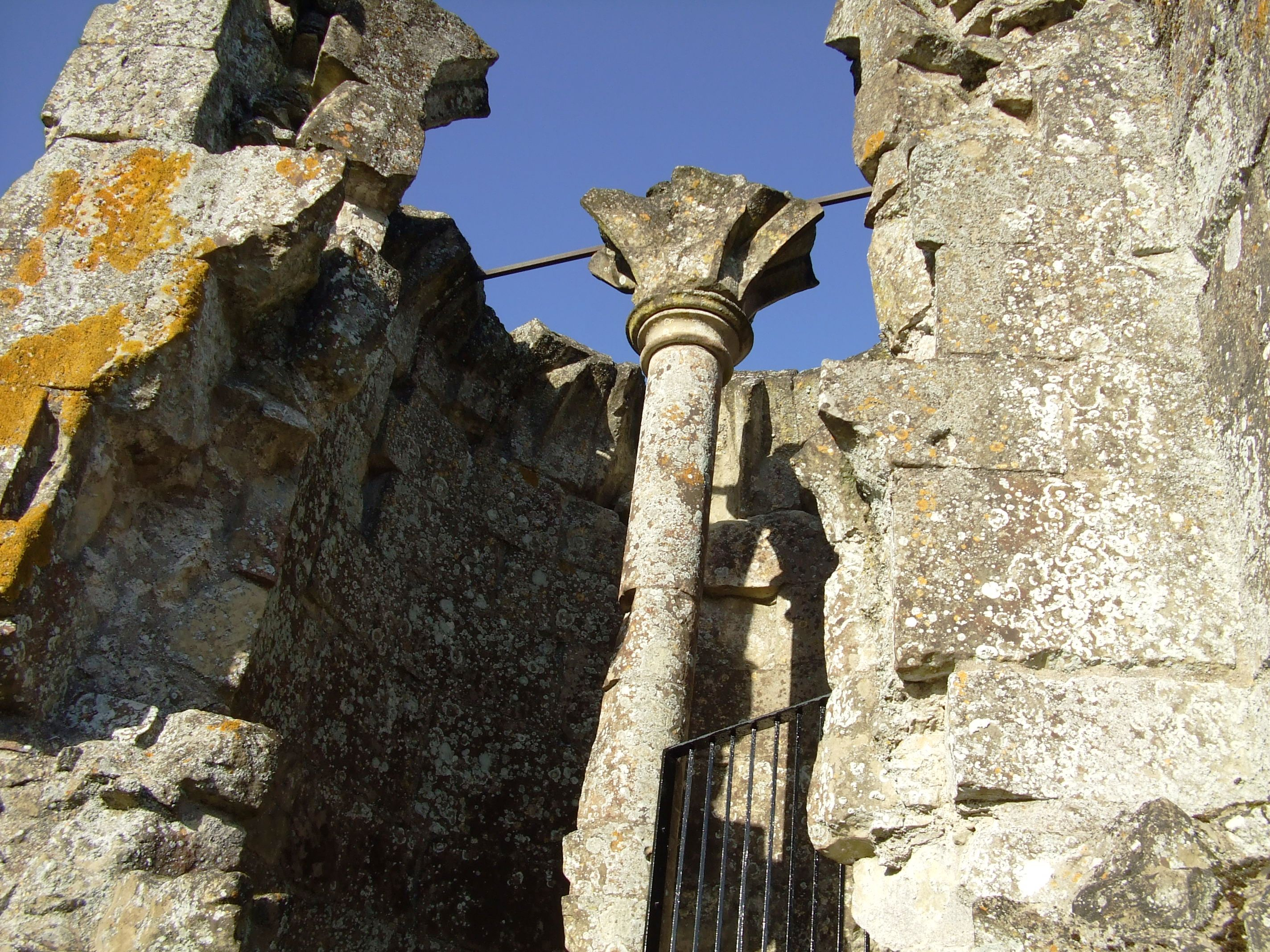
Top of the highest staircase

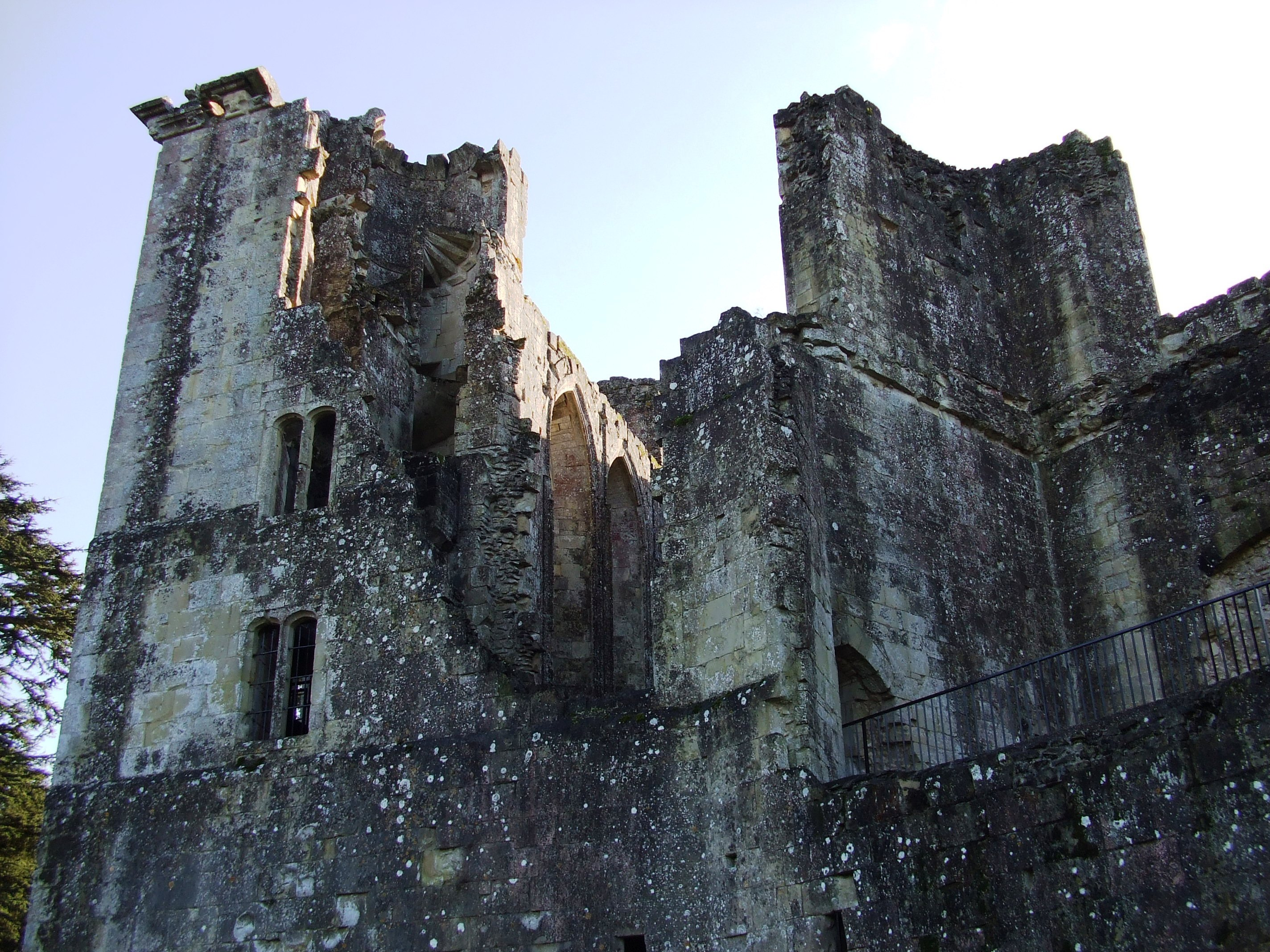
Staircases from exterior

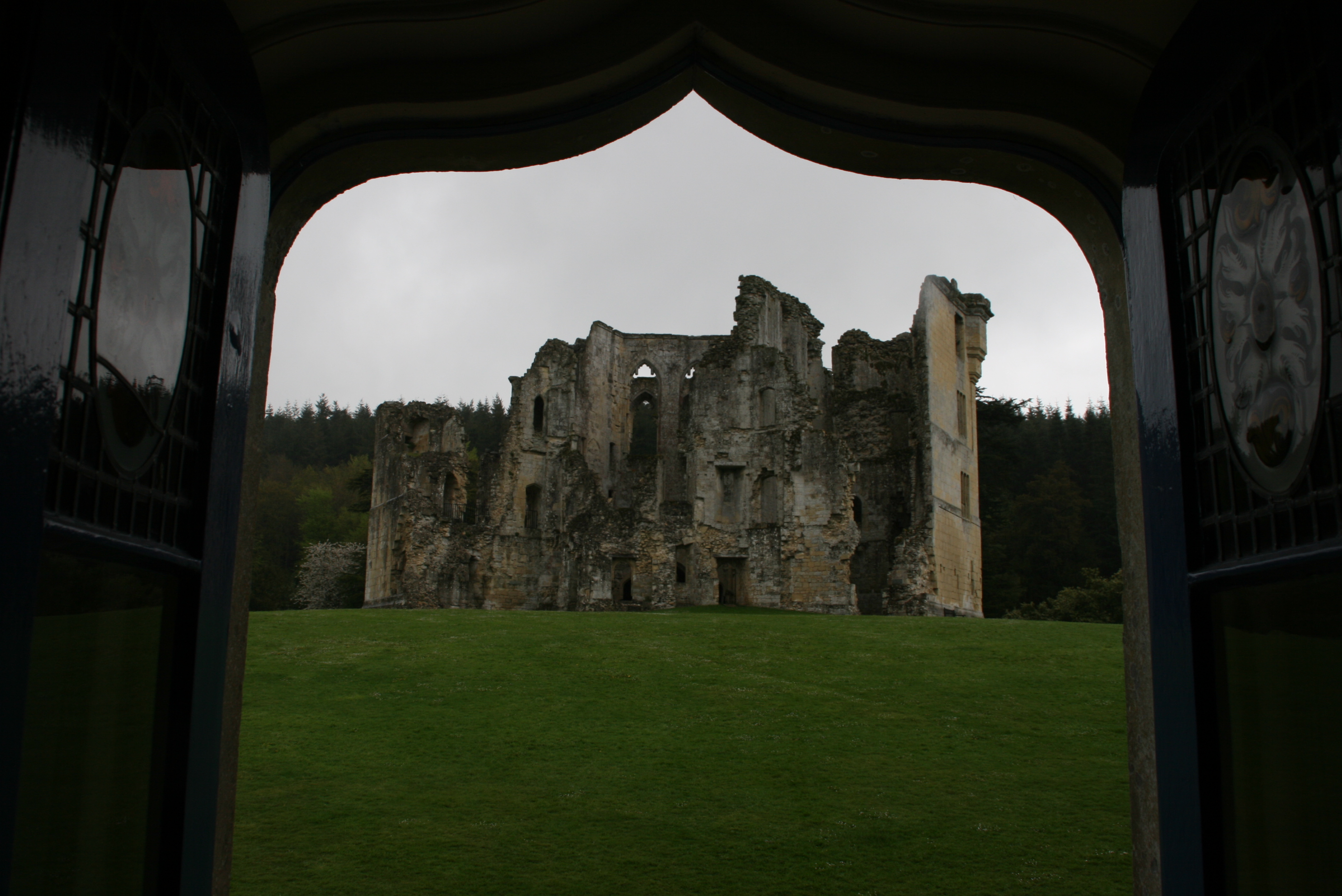
Ruins of Castle Wardour as seen from the lodge
