= Wardour (disambiguation) =

Wardour is a village and former parish in the English county of Wiltshire.

Wardour may also refer to:

- Wardour, a neighborhood in Annapolis, Maryland, United States
- Wardour Street, Soho, London
- Baron Arundell of Wardour
