= Melanie McFadyean =

British journalist and lecturer (1950–2023)

- Born: 24 November 1950; London, England
- Died: 16 March 2023 (aged 72); London, England
- Cause of death: Cancer
- Education: Sherborne School for Girls; Cranborne Chase School; University of Leeds (BA, MA); King's College London (MA)
- Occupations: Journalist; lecturer; agony aunt; writer
- Years active: 1970s–2022
- Spouse: Malcolm Blair (m. 2007)
- Children: 1
- Parents: Colin McFadyean (father); Marion Gutmann (mother)
- Relatives: Herbert M. Gutmann (grandfather)
- Awards: Amnesty International UK Media Award (2001); Bar Council Legal Reporting Award (2014)

Melanie McFadyean (24 November 1950 – 16 March 2023) was a British journalist and lecturer. She wrote for a number of papers, including The Guardian, The Observer, The Sunday Times and The Independent, particularly about asylum, immigration and human rights issues.

In the 1980s, McFadyean was an advice columnist for young people, serving as agony aunt (1983–1986) of Just Seventeen teen magazine, and going on to become editor of The Guardian newspaper's "Young Guardian" page. In her career as an investigative journalist, she was the recipient of the Amnesty International UK Media Award and the Bar Council Legal Reporting Award. Also an educator, she worked as a part-time lecturer in journalism at City University, London.

== Early life and education ==
=== Birth and family ===
Melanie McFadyean was born in London, England, on 24 November 1950, the second daughter of Marion (née Gutmann; 1921–2007) and Colin McFadyean (1914–2007). Her father was an international business lawyer who served as a Royal Navy Volunteer Reserve during World War II, and was later recruited as a naval interrogator by Ian Fleming (creator of James Bond) to Britain's Naval Intelligence Division. At the end of the war, Colin became head of the section and was involved in reading the terms of surrender to Admiral Karl Dönitz (Hitler's successor) in Flensburg.

McFadyean marvelled in 1988 at how her 100-year-old paternal grandmother, Lady McFadyean (born Dorothea "Dora" Emily Chute; 1888–1991), could vividly recall Victorian-era events dating back to 1896. The centenarian remembered both the suffragette campaigns of her youth and the devastating "Great War" – the original term for World War I. Her paternal grandfather, Sir Andrew McFadyean (1887–1974), was a British Treasury specialist on World War I reparations, knighted by George V in 1925, who later aided Jewish refugees and those unjustly interned during World War II.

McFadyean's mother, Marion, was a German-Jewish refugee, artist, and illustrator. Her maternal grandfather, Herbert M. Gutmann (1879–1942), was a banker, art collector, and director of the Dresdner Bank in Berlin from 1910. He faced severe persecution in Nazi Germany and was the son of the German bank's co-founder, Eugen Gutmann (1840–1925), who had converted from Judaism to Protestantism. Despite his family's conversion, Herbert Gutmann was still forced off the board following the 1931 banking crisis and subsequently targeted due to his Jewish heritage, leading to the forced auction of his extensive art collection at the Berlin auction house Paul Graupe in April 1934. In recent decades, his descendants have worked to track down and reclaim the pieces.

On 30 June 1934, during the Night of the Long Knives, Gutmann was briefly detained by the SS. Recognizing the growing danger, he fled Nazi Germany on 12 November 1936, travelling via Switzerland to London, where he found work as a stockbroker. Throughout 1937, his aristocratic German wife, Daisy (née von Frankenberg und Ludwigsdorf; 1889–1959), made several return visits to friends at their Potsdam estate, Herbertshof, before fleeing the Nazis to join her husband in London in October 1937 alongside their daughter, Marion.

Gutmann fell seriously ill in 1939 and had an operation, but never fully recovered. The Nazi government subsequently stripped him of his citizenship and expropriated his remaining assets in Berlin and Potsdam in 1941. He died impoverished in the south-western English seaside resort of Paignton, Devon, on 22 December 1942. His youngest brother, Friedrich "Fritz" Bernhard Eugen Gutmann (1886–1944), was murdered at the Theresienstadt concentration camp in 1944, shortly before Friedrich's wife, Louise (née von Landau; 1892–1944), was gassed at Auschwitz. Gutmann's wife, Daisy, survived the war and died in 1959.

During World War II, Marion was recruited into the clandestine British Political Warfare Executive (PWE). She later featured in "Sex and the Swastika" (1999), an episode of the Channel 4 documentary series Secret History (Season 7, Episode 6), which explored the covert organisation. Working directly under Sefton Delmer's black propaganda unit, Marion utilised her artistic skills to forge false ration books, SS identity cards, and postcards for Allied use behind enemy lines. There she met Colin, whom she later married. After the war, she worked as a children's book illustrator, picture restorer, and garden designer.

McFadyean's parents were married from 1940 until their divorce in 1960, after which her father married the post-war BBC television announcer Mary Malcolm (1918–2010), who became known for her spoonerisms. McFadyean wrote about the struggles faced by her father in later life to cope with her stepmother's debilitating dementia and the disease in general.

=== School and university ===
McFadyean attended two all-girls independent boarding schools: Sherborne School for Girls in North Dorset. However, she was expelled after a year. She then joined her elder sister at the former Cranborne Chase School, near Tisbury, Wiltshire, about which she recalled: "It was such a degenerate and lawless place that I had to go in search of the rules in order to break them. It took me two and a half years to get expelled."

At Cranborne Chase, McFadyean studied O-Levels in Russian, French, Greek, Latin, Biology, English Language, and History, but was excluded from Mathematics. She passed five subjects at the lowest grades before being expelled. She especially loved Russian, inspired by her teacher Mrs. M. Rodzianko — wife of Father Vladimir Rodzianko (later Bishop Basil Rodzianko) — but failed Biology after walking out of a locust dissection exam.

McFadyean later expressed sadness at her Russian teacher's death, recalling a Soviet grammar book packed with depictions of collective farms (kolkhozy; колхозы), enthusiastic comrades (tovarishchi; товарищи), and robust, powerful female tractor drivers (traktoristki; трактористки).

McFadyean noted that Soviet propaganda and art depicted women as robust, economically independent, and physically strong comrades who stood alongside men in factories, fields, and political life. The Socialist Realist ideal of the "New Soviet Woman" was "positively dangerous" because it directly challenged Western norms of femininity, subverting women's traditional gender roles.

By contrast, McFadyean's genteel French textbook reinforced bourgeois Western ideals, depicting a "goody-goody [girl] from Clermont-Ferrand" whose role was limited to assisting her mother, reinforcing the traditional view of women solely as home-makers and mothers confined solely to the domestic sphere.

In contrast to her secondary education, McFadyean excelled academically as an undergraduate. She graduated from the University of Leeds in 1974 with a first-class BA degree in English, and subsequently completed an MA in the same subject.

== Career ==
=== Early career ===
After completing her studies in 1974, McFadyean returned to London and navigated a highly eclectic period of employment, taking on various short-term roles across the city. During these foundational years, she gained experience working as a waitress, an office girl, a youth worker, and a market researcher on trains.

McFadyean's varied background eventually led her into the field of education, beginning in Hackney, East London, where she initially took a position teaching art at a local school. Her career shifted direction again in 1976 when she moved away from art instruction to teach English at Hackney College of Further Education, anchoring her professional focus within the local community.

=== Journalism career (1970s–2000s) ===
While McFadyean worked across television and radio, she primarily published in print media. She contributed to various British national broadsheet and tabloid newspapers, including The Guardian, The Observer, The Independent, The Independent on Sunday, The Sunday Times, The Mail on Sunday, The Daily Telegraph, Daily Express, and Daily Mirror.

McFadyean also wrote for a number of British magazines and outlets, such as Womens Voice, Socialist Review, Kicks, The Guardian Weekly, London Review of Books, Granta, New Statesman, Times Higher Education, openDemocracy, and the Bureau of Investigative Journalism.

McFadyean covered lifestyle, culture, and women's titles. These included The Sunday Times Magazine, New Society, City Limits, Company, Honey, Cosmopolitan, Marie Claire, and Elle. For Just Seventeen, she served as an advice columnist, and for The Oldie, she authored the regular column "Pearls of Wisdom".

Much of McFadyean's journalism focused on refugees and asylum seekers, initially inspired by her own family story: "My mother was a refugee from Nazi Germany. She escaped but she had an aunt and an uncle [Louise and Friedrich] who didn't, so I grew up with it, knowledge of refugees. But the thing that got me in to it was someone rang me up and asked if I had heard this story about children disappearing... I have worked as a teacher, as an agony aunt and always had an affiliation with children and the idea that they were going missing..."

==== 1970s: Socialist-feminist journalism ====
From the late 1970s, McFadyean contributed news articles to Womens Voice (1972–1982), a monthly socialist-feminist newspaper/magazine and organisation dedicated to women's liberation. Her work for the publication often highlighted how geopolitical issues and working-class struggles uniquely impacted women.

In October 1978, McFadyean reviewed the American feminist literary critic Elaine Showalter's seminal work A Literature of Their Own: British Women Novelists from Brontë to Lessing (Virago, 1978; Princeton University Press, 1977) for the Socialist Review, a monthly magazine of the British Socialist Workers Party (SWP).

Writing under the typo "Melanie McFadven", McFadyean lauded Showalter's intersectional approach, which examined female authors through the lenses of social history, maternity, family structures, and personal economic conditions rather than detached structuralism or formalist aesthetics. Showalter coined the term "gynocritics" in 1979 for a female framework dedicated to studying "women as writers" rather than just consumers of literature.

McFadyean agreed with Showalter's critique that British women novelists lacked the overt political zeal found in contemporary American feminist literature, and she concluded the essay with a call to action for British feminists to "go on the offensive" using the written word as a tool for systemic change.

Driven by this commitment, McFadyean travelled to Belfast in 1979 to document the realities of women living through the Troubles in Northern Ireland. Rather than focusing strictly on mainstream military or political narratives, she sought to capture how the sectarian conflict transformed everyday family survival, community organizing, and state surveillance.

McFadyean's immersive fieldwork and interviews on the frontlines of West Belfast ultimately culminated in the landmark book Only The Rivers Run Free: Northern Ireland: The Women's War (Pluto Press, 1984). Co-authored with Eileen Fairweather and Roisin McDonough, the work gave a definitive voice to women's experiences during the conflict.

==== 1980s: Youth journalism and media ====
McFadyean began her career in music and youth journalism during the early 1980s. Alongside Bert MacIver, she assisted in launching Kicks, a monthly music magazine aimed at teenagers that was published from 1981 to 1982.

Following the launch of the British teen-girl magazine Just Seventeen, aka J-17, in 1983, McFadyean was appointed as the publication's resident agony aunt. Writing the popular "Dear Melanie" advice column until 1986, she received upwards of 12,000 letters annually in her postbag. The column delivered comfort and practical guidance to a generation of teenage girls (and sometimes boys).

In 1987, McFadyean expanded her work in youth education by writing the introduction to the British AIDS education leaflet Love Carefully: Use a condom. This public health campaign, produced in tandem with the Brook Advisory Centres and the Family Planning Association, featured a cartoon strip and celebrity endorsements. Its success led to a second edition in 1990.

After 1986, McFadyean spent five years at The Guardian as commissioning editor of "Young Guardian", where she expertly mentored and published young journalists such as Nigel Fountain, Jay Rayner and Sarah Bailey. In addition to contributing articles, she interviewed prominent figures including British women's health campaigner Vera Houghton (a key figure in abortion law reform), comedian and actor Lenny Henry, and acclaimed American author Joyce Carol Oates.

==== 1990s: Freelance journalism ====
For The Independent's "How We Met" series in the early 1990s, McFadyean explored personal and professional relationships among prominent figures. These included literary and activist pairings such as British science fiction author Michael Moorcock and American radical feminist writer Andrea Dworkin; the Rolling Stones guitarist Ronnie Wood and his then-wife, model and TV personality Jo Wood; and American-British comedian Ruby Wax with British TV producer Ed Bye.

The series also featured McFadyean's other British literary, broadcasting, and activist pairings, such as author Jonathan Meades and his childhood friend Harry Dodson; Ian McAlley and author Shirley Conran; TV presenter Magenta Devine and TV producer David Okuefuna; and investigative journalist Paul Foot (known for campaigns against miscarriages of justice) with activist Ann Whelan.

For The Independent, McFadyean also interviewed actress Julie Christie, Kurdish activist Sheri Laizer, and Lisa Taylor, one of the two sisters wrongly imprisoned for the murder of Alison Shaughnessy. She also wrote about whether Gulf War syndrome in soldiers was the result of exposure to chemical warfare agents.

==== 2000s: Investigative journalism, lecturing, and activism ====
During the 2000s, as The Oldie's "Pearls of Wisdom" columnist, McFadyean interviewed British veterans, including travel writer Colin Thubron, Lindisfarne resident islander Reverend Canon Kate Tristram, and actor Dudley Sutton (known for Lovejoy). Others interviewed included illustrator and writer Shirley Hughes, journalist Katharine Whitehorn, film director Stephen Frears, and medical doctor and politician Richard Taylor.

McFadyean wrote about the 2010 hunger strike by women detainees at the Yarl's Wood Immigration Removal Centre, a detention centre for foreign nationals prior to their deportation from the UK. She also highlighted other issues, such as foreign prisoners in British jails, and the detention and deportation of child migrants.

In January 2012, McFadyean published an interview with Winnie Johnson, the mother of Keith Bennett, the 12-year-old victim of the Moors Murderers whose body remains undiscovered. The article appeared in The Guardian just months before Johnson's death in August 2012.

In 2013, McFadyean authored an investigative interview on the disappearance of Ben Needham, a case she had followed since the mid-90s. The 21-month-old British Sheffield toddler whose whereabouts remain unknown vanished from the Greek island of Kos in 1991. The piece detailed the impact of the tragedy on Ben's mother, Kerry Needham, as she released her autobiography.

In February 2014, McFadyean was interviewed by British historian and espionage writer Helen Fry at the London Jewish Cultural Centre about her parents' World War II intelligence work. Her father, Colin, had been recruited into Britain's Naval Intelligence Division by Ian Fleming, while her mother, Marion, a German-Jewish refugee and artist, worked for a specialized intelligence unit forging documents for operations behind enemy lines.

In a 2016 YouTube interview, McFadyean spoke with activist Erin Pizzey (advocate of both men's and women's rights), highlighting Pizzey's work founding the world's first modern domestic violence shelter, Chiswick Women's Aid (now Refuge).

From 2001 to 2015, McFadyean worked as a part-time lecturer in journalism at City University, London. During her tenure, she ran the Investigative MA programme and later taught students within the Magazine MA specialism.

Driven by a commitment to non-violent conflict resolution, McFadyean was deeply moved by the plight of asylum seekers and refugees. This passion led her to write extensively on the subject in 2006 for The Guardian and various other publications.

In June 2008, during a Refugee Week event in Oxford addressing the treatment of asylum seekers in the United Kingdom, McFadyean participated in a panel discussion alongside refugees and the British journalist and campaigner Melissa Benn. The occasion featured Tariq Ali, the Pakistani-British political activist and writer, as the keynote speaker.

To deepen her expertise, McFadyean embarked on a Conflict Resolution in Divided Societies MA at King's College London. This multidisciplinary and comparative programme allowed her to explore national, ethnic, and religious conflicts in deeply divided societies.

McFadyean's analytical focus on human rights and institutional accountability continued into 2010, when she wrote about the International State Crime Initiative. Published in the Times Higher Education magazine, her work highlighted the critical issue of state-perpetrated crime.

== Broadcasting ==
=== Television ===
McFadyean made two guest appearances on the British television review programme Did You See...? (Season 9, Episodes 12 and 19), presented by Ludovic Kennedy and first aired by BBC2 on 17 January and 20 March 1988. In episode 12 of Did You See...?, she reviewed the British television film The Vision (1988) which starred Dirk Bogarde who uncovers sinister motives behind a new satellite TV channel. In episode 19, she looked at the job opportunities open to television presenters in commercials and corporate videos.

McFadyean worked on The Lost Boy – part of the Cutting Edge series, about the disappearance of British Sheffield toddler Ben Needham, which she repeatedly returned to in radio and print, broadcast by Channel 4 on 10 March 1997. He was the 21-month-old child who vanished from the Greek island of Kos in 1991. Despite numerous claims of sightings, his whereabouts remain unknown. Her reporting on the case was widely commented upon and commended by other journalists.

McFadyean co-wrote, with Nick Davies, The Boy Business (Season 1, Episode 98) of the Network First documentary about British paedophiles who prey on homeless and vulnerable children, broadcast by ITV on 26 March 1997. As the ex-advice columnist for Just Seventeen teen-girl magazine, McFadyean appeared on I Love 1983 (Season 1, Episode 4) of I Love the '80s nostalgia series, presented by Roland Rat and broadcast by BBC Two on 10 February 2001. She was consultant producer on the documentary film Guilty by Association, produced by Fran Robertson and broadcast by BBC One on 7 July 2014.

=== Radio ===
McFadyean's BBC Radio 4 work included Thirty Years and More, a five-part series on couples who have been together for three decades and more, produced by Bob Dickinson and first broadcast from 20 to 24 June 2005. Three of the episodes were also aired from 21 March to 4 April 2006. Approximately five months prior to the first broadcast, McFadyean had written an article about long-term relationships in The Guardian: "When people who have been together a long time talk about what has kept them so, there is usually something there you'd call love."

McFadyean also made Who Was Opal?, a 30-minute BBC Radio 4 documentary programme about the American nature writer and diarist Opal Whiteley, whose childhood diary became an international bestseller in the 1920s, also produced by Bob Dickinson and first broadcast on 5 January 2010, which also aired on 26 April 2024. McFadyean guides the listener through Whiteley's childhood in the Oregon backwoods, her eventual tragic end in a British psychiatric hospital and final resting place in London's Highgate Cemetery. The overview of her life also includes interviews with Whiteley experts.

== Awards and recognition ==
In 2001, McFadyean won an Amnesty International UK Media Award for her piece "Human traffic" published the same year in The Guardian about unaccompanied asylum-seeking children, and in 2007, she was shortlisted by Amnesty International for her 2006 article "£ ... per incident: suicides in immigration detention" in the London Review of Books. She also served on the panel of judges for the Amnesty International Media Awards.

In 2014, McFadyean's work as part of an eight-month investigation into the use of the legal doctrine of "joint enterprise" in murder trials resulted in a report for the Bureau of Investigative Journalism that won the Bar Council Legal Reporting Award. The investigation revealed that at least 1,800 people had been prosecuted for homicide using the little-known and unclear law of joint enterprise.

== Publications ==
McFadyean wrote a father-daughter contribution, "Looking for Daddy", for the anthology Fathers: Reflections by Daughters (Virago, 1983), edited by Ursula Owen. She co-wrote, with Eileen Fairweather and Roisin McDonough, Only The Rivers Run Free: Northern Ireland: The Women's War (Pluto Press, 1984), described by The Women's Review of Books as "passionate, compelling and absolutely necessary". She also co-authored, with Margaret Renn, a compilation of Margaret Thatcher and Conservative quotes entitled Thatcher's Reign: A Bad Case of the Blues (Chatto & Windus, 1984), arranged and annotated by subject and date.

McFadyean published a collection of nine short stories illustrated by Anne Magill and entitled Hotel Romantika and Other Stories (Virago Upstarts, 1987) for teenagers – "a collection which captures the humour, chagrin and sheer exuberance of finding one's way in the world." She published Drugs Wise: A Practical Guide for Concerned Parents About the Use of Recreational Drugs (Icon Books, 1997), which aims to encourage drug users and their parents to speak about their experiences as well as offering practical professional advice.

McFadyean co-authored and researched, with David Rowland, on the private finance initiative (PFI) process for the Joseph Rowntree Reform Trust in relation to consultation procedures in local PFI projects, published as three reports for the Menard Press in 2002: PFI vs Democracy? The Case of Birmingham's Hospitals, PFI vs Democracy? School Governors and the Haringey Schools PFI Scheme, and Selling off the Twilight Years: The Transfer of Birmingham's Homes for Older People.

== Personal life ==
In 1990, McFadyean had a son with her long-term partner Malcolm Blair, a builder from New Zealand whom she met in Hackney; the couple later married in 2007. Around the turn of the millennium, she wrote a travelogue documenting their journey to his native New Zealand. For The Guardian, she reviewed Provocation (1999) and Guilt (2000), the first two novels by the Aucklander Charlotte Grimshaw, blending literary criticism with reflections on the country's landscape.

McFadyean and her young son collaborated on the jazz-infused fourth track "Return To Patagonia" from Lemon Jelly's second studio album, Lost Horizons. The British electronic music duo released the record on 7 October 2002. The track opens with overlapping mother-son voice-overs. He asks, "Where are we?" and she replies: "Won't be long now." These lines repeat over the steady rhythm of a chugging train engine before the music swells into the track's main psychedelic instrumentation. The words were sampled from the Swallows and Amazons (1974) British film adaptation of Arthur Ransome's 1930 children's adventure novel of the same name.

Lost Horizons was certified gold by the British Phonographic Industry on 22 July 2003 for shipments exceeding 100,000 copies. It received a Mercury Prize nomination that same year and was also nominated for the BRIT Awards 2004.

=== Charity work ===
McFadyean served as a trustee from 2011 to 2023 for the Baobab Centre for Young Survivors in Exile. This charity offers a clinical and support service to young asylum seekers and refugees: children, adolescents and young adults and sometimes to parents and families.

In 2011, McFadyean highlighted the experiences of the charity's clients in an article for The Guardian: "You would never guess that these youngsters have been trafficked, caught up in wars, forced to be child soldiers, seen their parents murdered, been betrayed by them or never even known them."

McFadyean's advocacy continued in 2015 through a collaboration with Fran Robertson on the short film Ade’s Story. This project was created as part of the charity's Baobab Voices interview series, which focused on the trafficking of children within the UK.

=== Illness and death ===
In 2005, McFadyean was diagnosed with breast cancer after a routine mammogram. She then penned a cancer journal chronicling her journey from onset to remission in The Guardian. McFadyean described her novel experience as a platinum blonde undergoing chemotherapy: "I have dark hair and had I not had cancer and gone bald, I would never have known how much fun it is being blond. I bought a cheap but stylish platinum wig from World Of Wigs. My son said I looked like Pauline Fowler in EastEnders. I sometimes cover my driving mistakes with rude hand gestures, but as a platinum blonde I had no need."

In 2006, McFadyean explained her motivation for writing the cancer diary the previous year and expressed a desire for others with different cancers to share their experiences. She explained her rapid transition to writing: "I took swiftly to print when I got it and wrote a piece for The Guardian. This was part exorcism, part because as frightening as it is to be healthy one day and have the threat of death hanging over you the next, the cancer journey isn't dull."

McFadyean employed a metaphor for cancer as a journey rather than a battle: "Why should people with cancer be expected to take up arms? It is better to see cancer as a journey. Everyone says that being positive helps you to come through, and being positive during a journey seems easier to me than being positive during a war in which the enemy is all around you."

In 2012, McFadyean published a piece about cancer underfunding in Britain for The Guardian, writing: "Two things come to mind. The first is that, if a disease is on the increase, so should programmes to treat it be on the increase. The solution is a thought I return to time and again."

By 2019, McFadyean had recurrent cancer in the form of metastatic breast cancer that had spread to her lungs, liver, and brain. However, it appeared to be in remission and under control. During this time, she emailed a letter to The Guardian criticising the American poet and essayist Anne Boyer's harsh breast cancer treatment and the heartless privatisation of cancer care in the US compared to the UK's National Health Service (NHS). She warned: "If any more of the NHS is sold off US style, our medical world will lose the heart that contributes to keeping so many of us alive."

In contrast, McFadyean expressed gratitude for the patience, respect, and empathy she received from the NHS even when she was difficult. She praised her compassionate care, stating: "My treatment has been delivered by people whose medical expertise is underpinned by something that feels, dare I say it, like a kind of love."

Melanie McFadyean died in London from cancer on 16 March 2023, at the age of 72.

== Selected works ==
=== Books ===
- McFadyean, Melanie (1983). "Looking for Daddy". In Owen, Ursula (ed.). Fathers: Reflections by Daughters. Virago Press. p. 204. ISBN 978-0860683940.
- Fairweather, Eileen; Roisin McDonough; Melanie McFadyean (1984). Only The Rivers Run Free: Northern Ireland: The Women's War. Pluto Press. ISBN 978-0861046683.
- McFadyean, Melanie; Margaret Renn (1984). Thatcher's Reign: A Bad Case of the Blues. Chatto & Windus. ISBN 978-0701128579.
- McFadyean, Melanie (1987). Hotel Romantika and Other Stories. Virago Upstarts. ISBN 978-0860689188.
- McFadyean, Melanie (1997). Drugs Wise: A Practical Guide for Concerned Parents About the Use of Recreational Drugs. Icon Books. ISBN 978-1874166832.
- McFadyean, Melanie; David Rowland (2002). PFI vs Democracy? The Case of Birmingham's Hospitals. Menard Press. ISBN 978-1874320319.
- McFadyean, Melanie; David Rowland (2002). PFI vs Democracy? School Governors and the Haringey Schools PFI Scheme. Menard Press. ISBN 978-1874320326.
- McFadyean, Melanie; David Rowland (2002). Selling off the Twilight Years: The Transfer of Birmingham's Homes for Older People. Menard Press. ISBN 978-1874320333.

=== Further reading ===
- "Women who wait", New Society, 6 December 1985, pp. 406–407.
- "How we met: Ruby Wax and Ed Bye", The Independent, 17 April 1993.
- "The lost boy", The Independent, 21 January 1996.
- "More fumble than fun", The Independent, 15 September 1996.
- "Land of the strange", The Guardian, 15 August 1999.
- "Accidental tourists", The Guardian, 14 May 2000.
- "Human traffic", The Guardian, 9 March 2001.
- "Destiny's children", The Guardian, 10 March 2001.
- "Kitchen sink drama", The Guardian, 2 April 2002.
- With David Rowland: "A costly free lunch", The Guardian, 30 July 2002.
- "Hard labour", The Guardian, 14 September 2002.
- "A cold shoulder for Saddam's victims", The Guardian, 22 March 2003.
- "Where am I?", The Guardian, 18 July 2003.
- "Some kind of asylum", The Guardian, 6 September 2003.
- "Chilling echoes", The Guardian, 11 October 2003.
- "Congratulations – now get out", The Guardian, 12 November 2003.
- "I didn't teach her that!", The Guardian, 21 January 2004.
- "A pile-up of shameful contradictions", The Guardian, 24 November 2004.
- "The legacy of the hunger strikes", The Guardian, 4 March 2006.
- "Five Houses", Granta, 2 October 2006.
- "A lapse of humanity", The Guardian, 16 November 2006.
- "£ ... per incident: suicides in immigration detention", London Review of Books, Vol. 28, No. 22, 16 November 2006.
- "Centres of barbarism", The Guardian, 2 December 2006.
- "'The Nazis sent him written demands for atonement of being Jewish'", The Guardian, 10 February 2007.
- "The UK's child slaves", Mail & Guardian, 25 June 2007.
- "Britain's inhumane shame", The Guardian, 12 July 2007.
- "Relative Values: Kerry Grist and her daughter, Leighanna Needham", The Sunday Times, 23 March 2008.
- "When Ben Needham disappeared from a Greek farmhouse in 1991, his close-knit family were almost torn apart", The Guardian, 29 March 2009. (Edited extract of "Missing", by Melanie McFadyean from Granta 105: Lost and Found.)
- "The scandal that is Yarl's Wood", The Independent, 1 March 2010.
- "Our asylum system's fatal failures", The Guardian (Comment is free), 10 March 2010.
- "Research intelligence: Big Brother backlash", Times Higher Education, 10 June 2010.
- "Moors murders: 'Where is my Keith?'", The Guardian, 6 January 2012.
- "New guidelines could reduce wrongful convictions under 'joint enterprise' law", The Guardian, 5 March 2013.
- "The hunt for Ben Needham and the family that won't give up searching", The Guardian, 28 April 2013.
- "Opinion: 'As I got into the small print of joint enterprise it seemed I had wandered through the looking glass'", the Bureau of Investigative Journalism, 31 March 2014.
- With Maeve McClenaghan and Rachel Stevenson: "Serious concerns emerge over joint enterprise laws", openDemocracy, 1 April 2014.
- "In the Wrong Crowd", London Review of Books, Vol. 36, No. 18, 25 September 2014.
- "Compassion in Care", The Oldie, 13 November 2019.
- "Pearls of Wisdom from Dudley Sutton", The Oldie, 11 February 2020.
- With Fran Robertson: "Still guilty by association?", Proof magazine, No. 5, October 2021.
- "Not such a misfit - Stephen Frears", The Oldie, 3 November 2022.
