= Isabel Burton =

English writer and explorer (1831–1896)

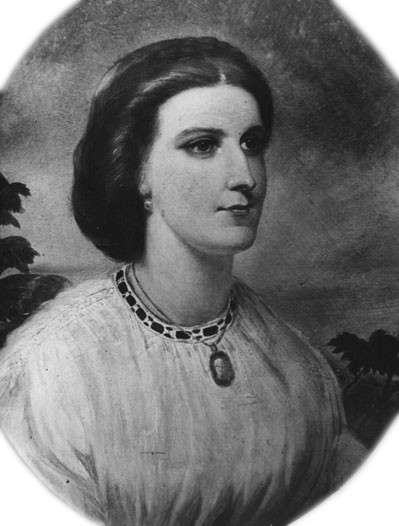
- Burton in 1861
- Born: Isabel Arundell; 20 March 1831; London, England
- Died: 22 March 1896 (aged 65); London, England
- Resting place: Churchyard of St Mary Magdalen Roman Catholic Church Mortlake, London, England
- Spouse: Richard Francis Burton (m. 1861; died 1890)

Isabel Burton (née Arundell; 20 March 1831 – 22 March 1896), later known as Lady Burton, was an English writer, explorer and adventurer. She was the wife and partner of the explorer, adventurer, and writer Sir Richard Francis Burton (1821–1890).

== Early life ==
Isabel Arundell was born in London, England, on 20 March 1831. She was the daughter of Hon. Henry Raymond Arundell (1799–1886) of Kenilworth, Warwickshire, nephew of James Everard Arundell, 10th Baron Arundell of Wardour (1785–1834). Her mother, Eliza Gerard, was the sister of Robert Tolver Gerard (1808–1887), 13th Baronet of Bryn, Lancashire, and 1st Baron Gerard of Bryn.

Arundell was one of eleven children born into the Wardour family, a respected and well-to-do Roman Catholic family in England. She grew up enmeshed in London society and attended the convent of the Canonesses of the Holy Sepulchre, where she excelled as a writer and in theological studies.

During the Crimean War, Arundell was refused three times in her quest to be a "Nightingale nurse" and instead set up a group of 150 like-minded women from Catholic families known as the Stella Club to assist the wives and children of soldiers who had married without permission and for whom the Army took no responsibility. Such women and children were often in dire circumstances at home. Arundell and her group went into the slums of London, against the advice of the police, to distribute assistance.

== Marriage ==
The Arundell family crossed the Channel to Boulogne in 1850, reducing their expenses, and avoiding the Anti-Catholicism following the return of Dr. Nicholas Wiseman as England's Cardinal Archbishop of Westminster. The girls were learning French in the Sacré Coeur convent during the day, but were allowed strolls along the Haute Ville ramparts, when Isabel and her sister Blanche met Richard Burton. Isabel wrote later, "He looked at me as though he read me through and through in a moment...I was completely magnetized". Isabel told her sister, "That man will marry me". After Burton returned from the Crimean War in 1856, he proposed, agreeing to be married in the Catholic Church and raising their children as Catholics. Yet her mother opposed it on the grounds Burton was not a Christian, and had no money. In 1860, upon Burton's return from his trip to the United States, Burton gave Isabel an ultimatum to which Isabel responded, "I shall marry you this day three weeks..." Thus, they were married on 22 January 1861, after Burton received a special dispensation for a mixed marriage from Nicholas Cardinal Wiseman and promised in writing to let Isabel practice her religion, have their children raised as Catholics, and be married in the Catholic Church. Isabel's mother was eventually reconciled to the marriage; in Isabel's words, "She loved him as much as her own sons".

Isabel Burton was an intelligent, resourceful and devout woman, but is always seen in the shadow of her husband, one of the most famous of all Victorians. She was a strong supporter and advocate for her husband and assisted him in many of his most significant writings. He credited her with being his most ardent supporter. He encouraged her to write and she wrote a number of books, including a history of their travels in Syria and Palestine, as well as an autobiography, published posthumously. Some scholars believe that Richard Francis Burton himself wrote under her name, though this is unclear.

Isabel Burton is perhaps best known for burning his papers and manuscripts after his death, including his revised translation of The Perfumed Garden, which was to be called The Scented Garden, and of which the largest part consisted of the usually unpublished final chapter dealing with pederasty, plus Burton's extensive (and comprehensive) notes on the subject. It has been summed up:

His wife, fearful lest her husband be thought vicious because he collected data on what Victorian England called vice, at once burned the projected new edition of The Perfumed Garden he had been annotating. She then wrote a biography of Burton in which she tried to fashion this Rabelaisian scholar-adventurer into a good Catholic, a faithful husband, and a refined and modest man. Afterward she burned almost all of his 40-year collection of diaries and journals. The loss to history and anthropology was monumental; the loss to Burton’s biographers, irreparable.

In an appendix to her unfinished autobiography, Isabel Burton's posthumous collaborator William Henry Wilkins pointed out that she had a first offer of £6,000 for the manuscript, and moreover that she need never have disclosed her actions at all, or blamed them on her husband. He further claimed that she acted from a sincere belief that "out of a thousand men who read the work, 15 would read it in the scientific spirit in which it was written, and the other 985 solely for filth's sake", and feared that publication would blight, not her husband's worldly reputation – for his interest in the subject was notorious – but, by tempting others to sin, his prospects in the world to come.

== Last years ==
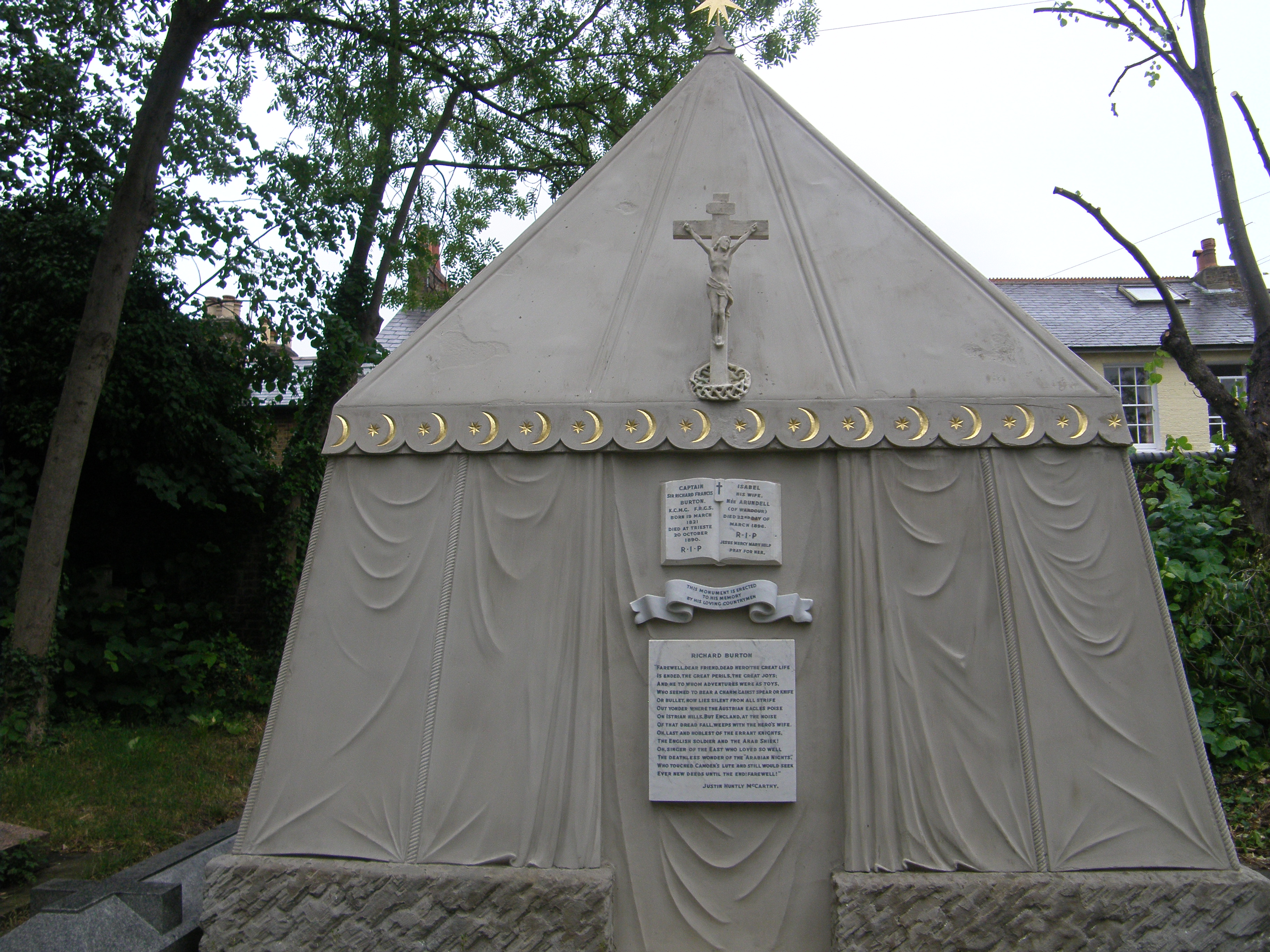
Sir Richard and Lady Burton's Tomb in Mortlake, south west London

In spite of the pain from cancer, Lady Burton finished a two-volume biography of her husband, titled Richard, The Life of Captain Sir Richard Francis Burton, which was published on 11 July 1893. Her own autobiography she completed with the help of W. H. Wilkins. The Romance of Isabel Burton was published in 1897.

Lady Burton moved to Eastbourne in September 1895 and returned to London in March 1896. She died in London on 22 March. Her body and that of her husband lie in the churchyard of St Mary Magdalen Roman Catholic Church Mortlake in southwest London, in an elaborate tomb in the shape of a Bedouin tent which she designed. The coffins of Sir Richard and Lady Burton can be seen through a window at the rear of the tent, which can be accessed via a short fixed ladder. Next to the lady chapel in the church, there is a memorial stained-glass window to Sir Richard, erected by Lady Burton.

== Bibliography ==
- The inner life of Syria, Palestine, and the Holy Land: from my private journal. London: H.S. King & Co., 1875.
- Arabia, Egypt, India: a narrative of travel. London: W. Mullan and Son, 1879.
- Prevention of cruelty, and anti-vivisection. London: William Mullan, 1879.
- The revival of Christianity in Syria: its miracles and martyrdoms. London: E. Stanford, 187-?.
- Iracema, the honey lips: a legend of Brasil by José de Alencar. Translated by Lady Isabel Burton. London: Bickers & Son, 1886. (New York: Luso-Brazilian Books, 2006. ISBN 0-85051-524-6)
- Lady Burton's edition of her husband's Arabian nights: translated literally from the Arabic by Sir Richard Francis Burton. London: Waterlow, 1886–1887.
- The life of Captain Sir Richard F. Burton. London: Chapman & Hall, 1893.
- The romance of Isabel, Lady Burton, the story of her life. London: Hutchinson & Co., 1897
- The passion-play at Ober-Ammergau. London: Hutchinson, 1900.

== In popular culture ==
Fiona Shaw portrayed her in the 1990 movie Mountains of the Moon and Barbara Leigh-Hunt portrayed her in the 1971 BBC series The Search for the Nile.

== See also ==
- Lady Burton's Rope Squirrel
