= New Wardour Castle =

Country house in Tisbury, Wiltshire, England

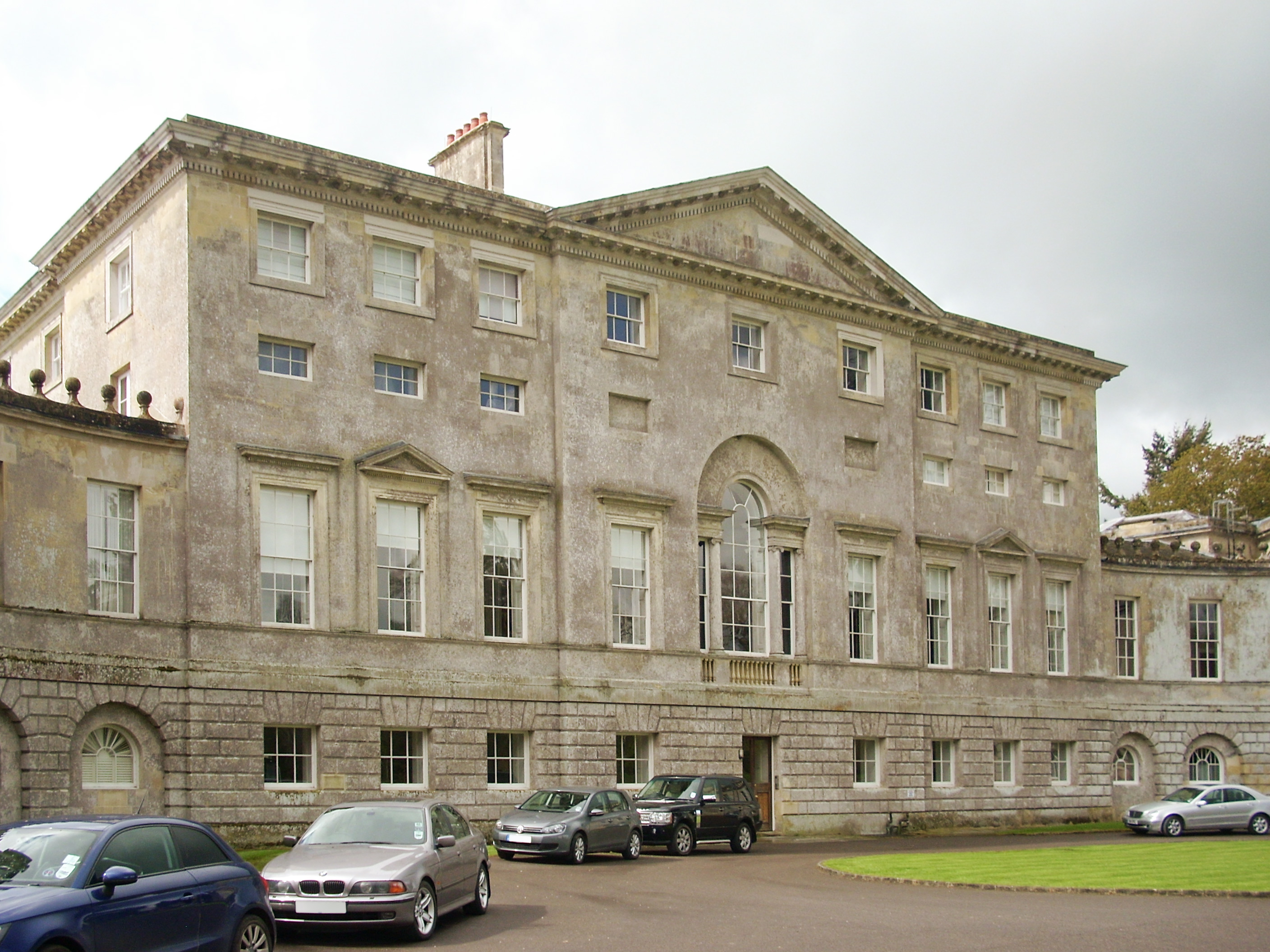
- New Wardour Castle

- Location within Wiltshire

General information
- Architectural style: Palladian
- Location: Tisbury, Wiltshire, England
- Coordinates: 51.0378°N 2.0940°W
- Construction started: 1769
- Completed: 1776
- Client: Henry Arundell, 8th Baron Arundell of Wardour

Design and construction
- Architect: James Paine

New Wardour Castle is a Grade I listed English country house at Wardour, near Tisbury in Wiltshire, built for the Arundell family. The house is of Palladian style, designed by the architect James Paine, with additions by Giacomo Quarenghi, who was a principal architect of the Imperial Russian capital city, Saint Petersburg.

The building of the house was begun in 1769 and completed in 1776, with additional buildings being added in the 1970s and 1980s. From 1961 to 1990, it was the home of Cranborne Chase School, an independent boarding school for girls.

New Wardour Castle is approximately 0.75 miles (1.2 km) from Old Wardour Castle, which was left as a landscape feature of the parkland of the new house. This was formerly the home of the Arundell family before it was besieged, damaged and slighted in the Civil War.

== House ==
The building is constructed from limestone ashlar with hipped Welsh slate roofs and comprises a square main block with flanking pavilions. The north front has a rusticated basement below a piano nobile, with mezzanine and attic floor over.

The house is described by English Heritage as "one of the finest Palladian houses in Wiltshire". It has a Roman Catholic chapel and a rare rotunda staircase. There are many painted ceilings and ornate fireplaces, typical of the building's period.

=== Rotunda ===
The ground floor of the rotunda is in limestone with black insets and a central black and white marble decoration. There are entrances from the north and south with double sweeping staircases on either side. The rotunda staircase was designed by James Paine and is 144 feet (44 m) round; the balustrade is fitted with glass candle lamps.

The first floor has a wooden floor and has Corinthian columns supporting the ornately coffered, domed ceiling which is decorated with reliefs of musical instruments and a central light. The surrounding balustrade is made of fine ironwork with gilded flowers and a wooden handrail. Also on the first floor is an organ.

=== All Saints' Chapel ===
The Roman Catholic chapel, integral to the house, is known as All Saints Chapel, Wardour. It is also the Roman Catholic parish church. It was enlarged in 1789 by Henry Arundell, 8th Baron Arundell of Wardour, to the designs of John Soane. From its beginning, it served the needs of a substantial local recusant community and still holds regular Sunday masses. Due to its exceptional acoustics, it is also sometimes used for musical events.

Pevsner describes the chapel as having "the size of a very major parish church" and being "grand in its decoration". By the entrance is a marble relief of the Virgin and Child, sculpted by P-E. Monnot in 1703; inside are giant fluted pilasters and a groin vault. The sanctuary added by Soane at the west end has Ionic columns and a domed ceiling with gilded plaster. The marble altar is by Giacomo Quarenghi, who later worked in Imperial Russia; the painting behind it is by Giuseppe Cades, and stained glass in the lunette window above is by Francis Eginton. Pevsner describes in some detail the important collection of vestments, dating from the 15th century onwards.

Ownership of the chapel was transferred to the Wardour Chapel Trust in the late 1890s, and the running costs and maintenance of this Grade I listed chapel are now funded entirely through voluntary donations.

== Parkland and garden ==
A Camellia house, with walled gardens, was built northeast of the house in 1769 by Richard Woods for the 8th Baron.

Plans for the grounds were suggested by Woods in 1764, but these proved too expensive and in 1773 were revised by George Ingham. Capability Brown was then brought in and undertook extensive earth-moving and tree planting between 1775 and 1783.

The current garden includes a ha-ha, and a walled garden with a swimming pool. There is a long driveway, which passes the 19th-century hexagonal annexe and leads to the rear of the building and the chapel.

There is also a temple, built as a folly, in a distinct area of the grounds referred to as the Temple Garden.

== Recent history ==
After the death in 1944 of John Arundell, 16th and last Baron Arundell of Wardour, a Roman Catholic, in 1946 the property was acquired by the Society of Jesus, who in 1955 licensed it to the Leonard Cheshire Foundation for a trial period. The initial idea of the founder, Group Captain Leonard Cheshire, was to use it as a home for rehabilitating prisoners, but in the end it became a home for those who could not be accepted into other Cheshire Homes in the British Isles. The home was officially opened in January 1956 under warden Colonel Ervine Andrews, who used part of the grounds as a pig farm to support the home financially. The number of residents was limited to eight, since the charity could only renovate part of the building for the residents to live in; the rest of the property was in poor structural condition. Despite an offer from the Ministry of Works of £40,000 to renovate the property, the trustees of the Leonard Cheshire Foundation could not commit to raising the further £20,000 needed to get the work done. The home closed on 1 January 1957, and the five remaining residents moved out.

In 1951, the house was designated by Historic England as a Grade I listed building, with its grounds later being Grade II* listed.

In 1961 New Wardour Castle became the home of Cranborne Chase School, which built new classrooms, studio dormitories, and a dining-room extension on the south-eastern side of the main house, along with three staff houses to the west. The school eventually closed in 1990.

In 1992 the house – along with five cottages, six tennis courts, and a swimming pool in the walled garden – was sold for under £1 million to Nigel Tuersley, and was converted into ten apartments by designer John Pawson. The two main floors of the central block, incorporating the rotunda and the original state rooms, form the principal apartment. It has eight reception rooms arranged in a circle around a piano nobile at the top of a 60 ft rotunda that rises to a magnificent glazed dome supported by eight composite columns. Extensions and ancillary accommodation added by the school were mostly demolished.

The house was used in the filming of the television mini-series First Born (1988), and in the filming of Billy Elliot, a film released in 2000.

In 2010 Jasper Conran bought apartment 1, planning to live between there and Ven House. He sold the apartment in 2020 for £4 million and auctioned the contents via Christie's in 2021. He has called the main staircase "possibly the best staircase in England, if not the world".

== See also ==
- 18th-century Western domes

== Gallery ==
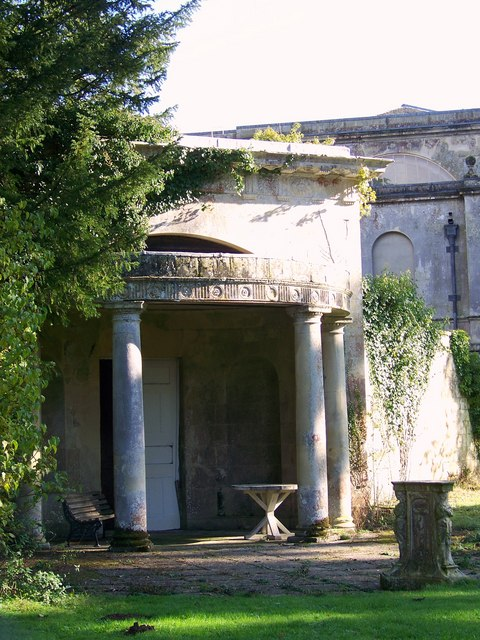
Dairy in Temple Garden

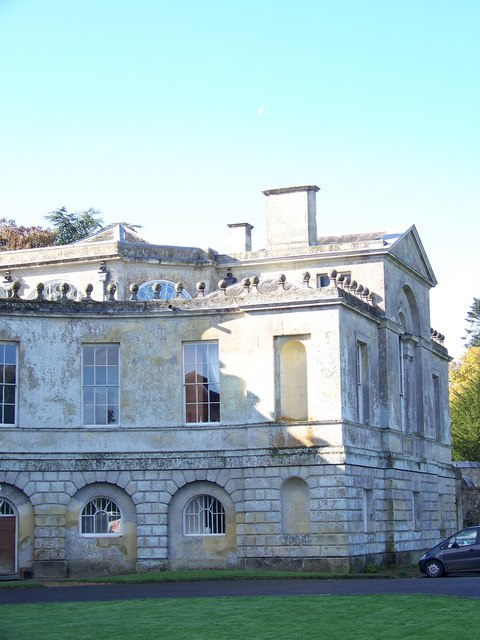
West wing

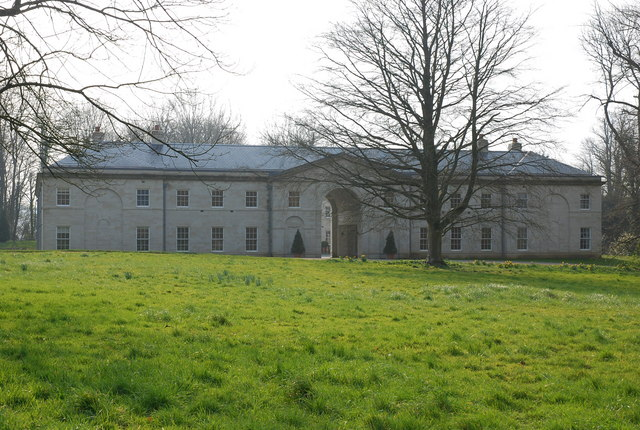
School building in the grounds, now residential

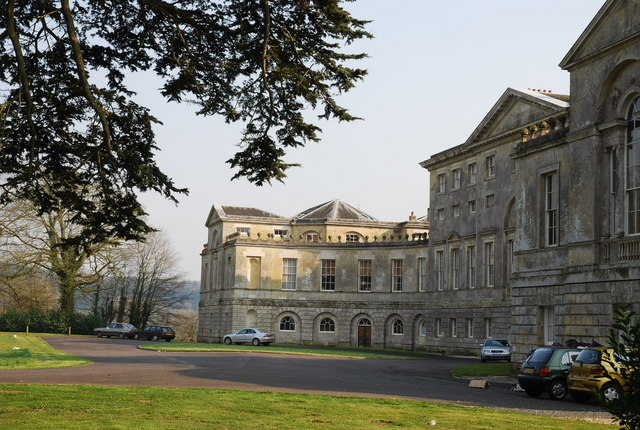
The front of the building
