= James Arundell, 10th Baron Arundell of Wardour =

English peer

James Everard Arundell, 10th Baron Arundell of Wardour (3 November 1785 – 21 June 1834), styled The Honourable James Arundell between 1808 and 1817, was an English peer.

Arundell was born at Clifford Street, St. James's, London, the son of James Everard Arundell, 9th Baron of Arundell of Wardour, by his first wife the Honourable Mary Christina Arundell, daughter of Henry Arundell, 8th Baron Arundell of Wardour.

He took his seat in the House of Lords in February 1830, taking the special version of the oath for Roman Catholic peers. He was the only Catholic peer to vote against the Reform Act 1832.

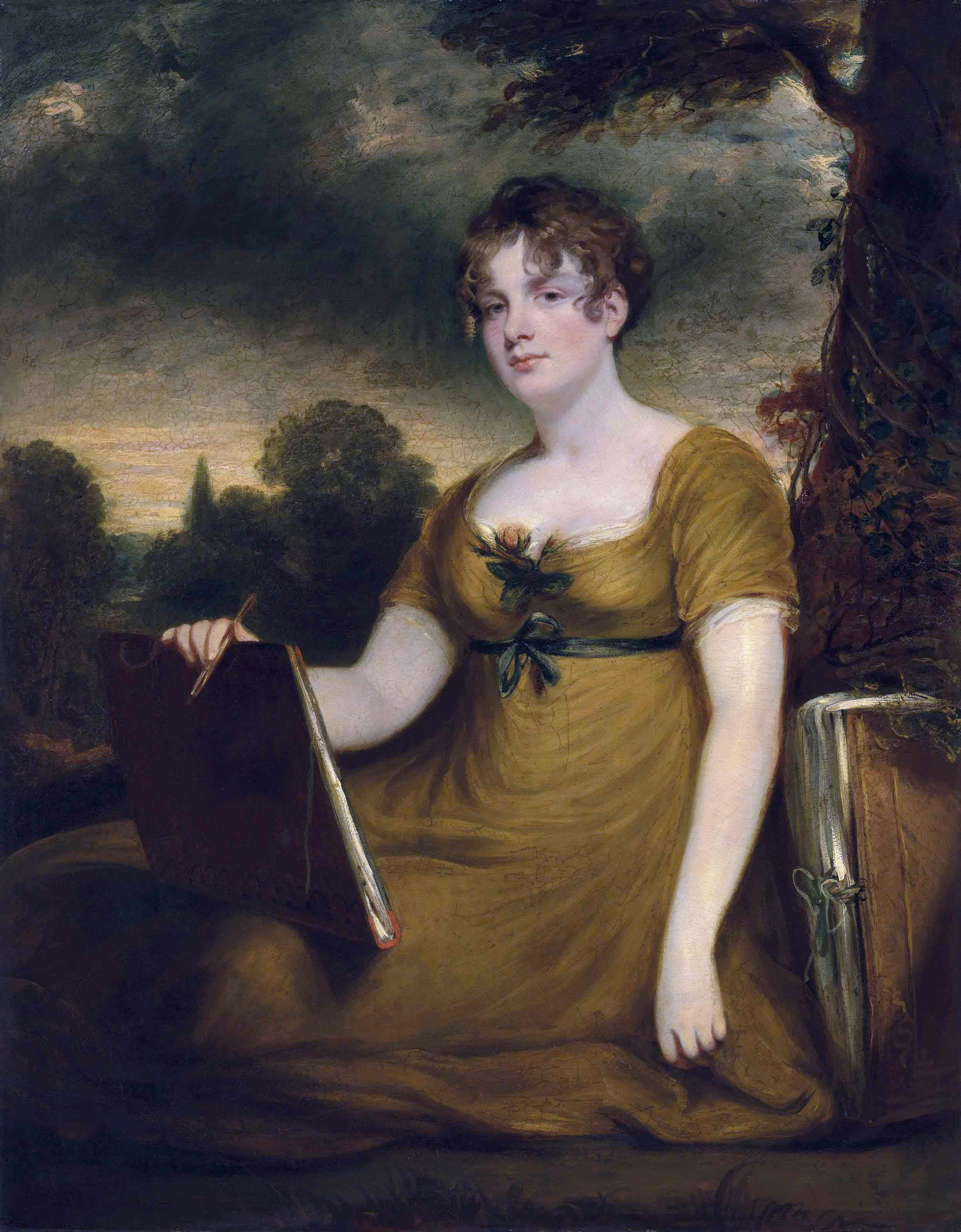
Mary Anne Nugent-Temple-Grenville, Lady Arundell of Wardour (1787–1845) (John Hoppner)

Lord Arundell of Wardour married Mary Anne Nugent-Temple-Grenville, daughter of George Nugent-Temple-Grenville, 1st Marquess of Buckingham, and Mary Elizabeth Nugent, 1st Baroness Nugent, at Buckingham House, London, in 1811. The marriage produced no surviving heir. He died in Rome in June 1834, aged 48, and was succeeded in the barony by his younger brother, Henry. Lady Arundell of Wardour died in June 1845, aged 57.

Peerage of England
Preceded by James Everard Arundell	Baron Arundell of Wardour; 1817–1834	Succeeded by Henry Benedict Arundell
