= John Arundell, 16th Baron Arundell of Wardour =

British nobleman

Arundell in May 1925.

John Francis Arundell, 16th Baron Arundell of Wardour JP TD (18 June 1907 – 25 September 1944) was a British soldier and member of the House of Lords.

== Biography ==
Arundell was the only son of Gerald Arthur Arundell, 15th Baron Arundell of Wardour, by his marriage to Ivy Florence Mary Segrave, daughter of Captain W. F. Segrave. He was educated at Stonyhurst College and New College, Oxford, where he graduated BA. After Oxford, he became a member of the London Stock Exchange, and succeeded to the barony and a seat in the House of Lords on the death of his father in 1939.

Arundell served in the Territorial Army as a second lieutenant on the General List from 1929 to 1931. He joined the 4th Battalion of the Wiltshire Regiment as a lieutenant in 1934, and was promoted to captain in 1939. With the 2nd Battalion the Wiltshire Regiment, he was part of the British Expeditionary Force and in 1940, during the Battle of France, was taken prisoner-of-war by the Germans. He escaped, but was recaptured and was transferred to Oflag IV-C at Colditz Castle. There he had a habit of exercising in the snow and, perhaps as a result, contracted tuberculosis.

In accordance with the Geneva Conventions, he was repatriated and died aged 37 in hospital in Chester. He was unmarried, and his barony became extinct upon his death. He was buried in the Chapel of New Wardour Castle.

== See also ==
- List of solved missing person cases

Peerage of England
| Preceded by Gerald Arundell | Baron Arundell of Wardour; 1939–1944 | Extinct |
