= Cranborne Chase School =

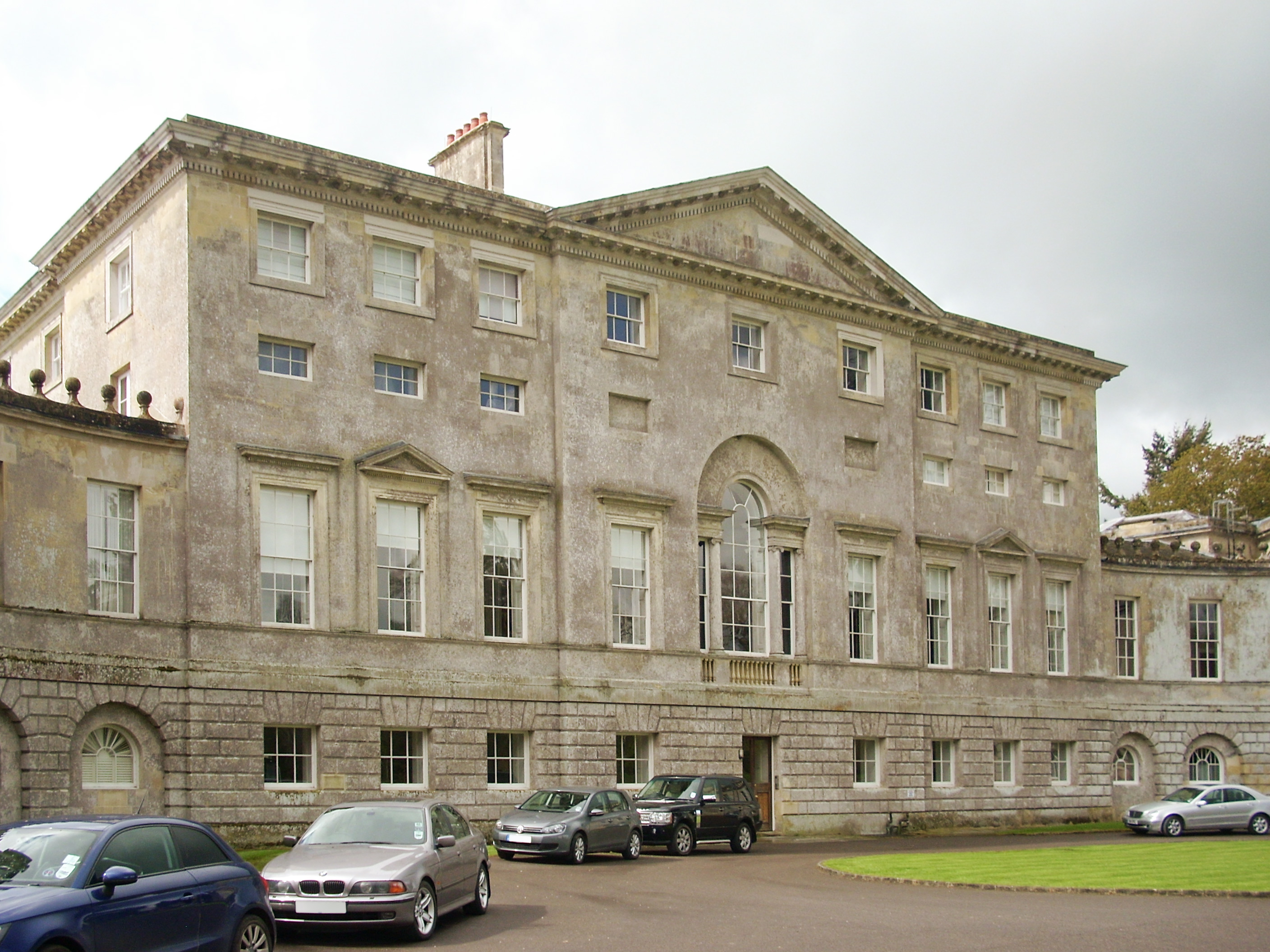
- New Wardour Castle, home of the School from 1961, until its closure in 1990. Photograph taken in 2013

Location
- Wardour (near Tisbury), Wiltshire, SP3 6RH; England; 51.038°N 2.094°W

Information
- Type: Independent school Day and boarding school Girls' school
- Religious affiliation: Church of England
- Established: 6 August 1946 (Crichel House)
- Founder: 'Betty' Galton
- Closed: 10 July 1990 (New Wardour Castle)
- Staff: 26 (1985 figure)
- Gender: Girls
- Age: 13 to 18
- Enrolment: 130 pupils (1985 figure)
- Publication: Cranborne Chase School Magazine
- Former pupils: Old Cranbornians
- Campus: Rural campus

Cranborne Chase School was an independent boarding school for girls and was located in the English counties of Dorset and (later) Wiltshire between 1946 and 1990.

== History ==
Cranborne Chase School opened in 1946 at Crichel House in the village of Moor Crichel in Dorset, England. In 1961, the school relocated to New Wardour Castle near Tisbury in Wiltshire and extensively renovated the building, which had fallen into a severe state of disrepair.

In 1985, the school had 130 girls, aged between 11 and 18 years, and 26 teachers. The school closed in July 1990.

== Wardour facilities ==
At New Wardour Castle (not to be confused with Wardour Castle), there were dormitories for girls in the 1st to 4th Forms around the top fourth floor of the building, each with beds for between two and six girls. Fifth Formers slept on the mezzanine floor below this. The Lower Sixth Form had studios for one or two girls in a modern extension on the south-eastern side of the building. Upper Sixth formers had their own individual rooms in the upper East Wing flat or in a separate building known as 'The Hexagon'.

Pupils ate in the modern dining hall built on the south-eastern side of the building, next to the gymnasium. This extension had additional modern classrooms for Art and Science. All other classrooms were in the main building, on the ground and first floors.

A student assembly was held most mornings around the rotunda staircase, with each year standing in groups between the columns. This usually included a short religious ceremony and singing accompaniment on the rotunda organ.

Outside, there was an open-air swimming pool in the walled garden, six tennis courts and a running track, with space for field sports on the front lawn. There was also an enclosure for outdoor pets, which students were encouraged to keep.

In addition to the Hexagon building, there were three houses for staff and their families, built in the 1970s. Other staff lived in flats within the main building or commuted from the surrounding area.

== Notable former pupils ==
- Josceline Dimbleby, cookery writer
- Mandy Ford, Anglican priest
- Princess Tatiana von Fürstenberg, singer, actress and socialite
- Amaryllis Garnett, actress
- Veronica Linklater, Baroness Linklater of Butterstone (1943–2022), a Liberal Democrat member of the House of Lords
- Roxanna Panufnik, composer
- Jane Ridley, author, biographer, commentator and Professor of Modern History at the University of Buckingham
- Joanna Waley-Cohen, professor of history at New York University
- Harriet Walter, actress
- Iona Brown, conductor and violinist
- Madeleine Redfern, mayor of the City of Iqaluit, Nunavut, Canada
- Melanie McFadyean (1950–2023), journalist and lecturer

== Aftermath ==
Betty Galton, the founding headmistress of Cranborne Chase School, died in December 2005.

The building, which is now a private residence, is featured as the ballet school in the 2000 film Billy Elliott.

The 2009 film Tanner Hall, written and co-directed by alumna Tatiana von Furstenberg, was loosely based on her experiences as a pupil there.
