= Wardour =

Settlement in Wiltshire, England

Coordinates: 51.044°N 2.105°W

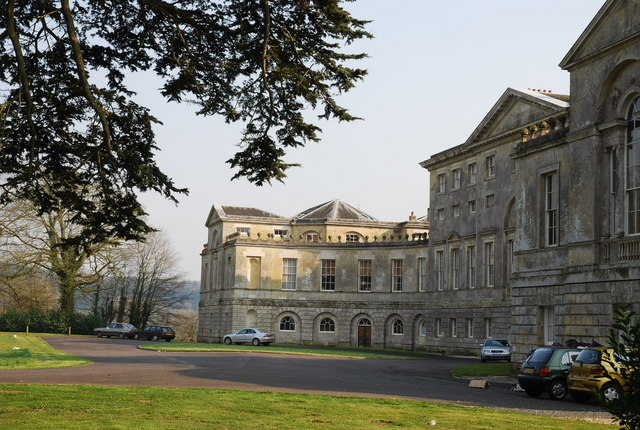
- New Wardour Castle

- Location within Wiltshire
- OS grid reference: ST927272
- Civil parish: Tisbury
- Unitary authority: Wiltshire
- Ceremonial county: Wiltshire
- Region: South West
- Country: England
- Sovereign state: United Kingdom
- Post town: Salisbury
- Postcode district: SP3
- Dialling code: 01747
- Police: Wiltshire
- Fire: Dorset and Wiltshire
- Ambulance: South Western
- UK Parliament: Salisbury

Wardour /ˈwɔːrdər/ is a settlement in the civil parish of Tisbury, in Wiltshire, England, about 13 miles (21 km) west of Salisbury and 4 miles (6 km) south of Hindon.

== History ==
A bronze age hoard known as the Wardour Hoard has been found in the village.

The land was an estate of Wilton Abbey by the 11th century.

The 15th-century Wardour Castle was slighted during the English Civil War, The stronghold was replaced in 1776 by New Wardour Castle, built between 1769 and 1776. It was long the home of the Lords Arundell of Wardour and later of Cranborne Chase School.

All Saints' Roman Catholic chapel, Wardour, originally belonged to the Arundells' household. It was enlarged in 1788 by the eighth Lord Arundell to the designs of Giacomo Quarenghi and John Soane. The chapel still has regular services and is also used for musical events.

In the 18th century, part of the estate was in Tisbury parish and part in Donhead St Andrew. In 1835 Tisbury was divided into three parishes: East Tisbury, West Tisbury and Wardour. In 1921 the parish had a population of 780. On 1 April 1927 East Tisbury and Wardour were united as Tisbury civil parish.

Wardour Catholic Primary School was built in 1862.

John Marius Wilson's Imperial Gazetteer of England and Wales (1870-1872) said of Wardour:

WARDOUR, a parish in Tisbury district, Wilts; 2¼ miles WSW of Tisbury r. station. Post town, Tisbury, under Salisbury. Acres and real property returned with Tisbury. Pop., 710. Houses, 119. W. Castle is the seat of Lord Arundell of W.; was built in 1776-89; is in the Grecian style, with a centre and crescent wings; has a rotunda staircase, 144 feet round; contains a rich collection of paintings and other works of art; and stands in a finely wooded park, about 5 miles in circuit. An ancient castle here was built by the Martins, before the time of Edward III; passed, through the Lovells, the Touchets, the Audleys, and others, to the Arundells; was the birthplace of Lord Chief Justice Hyde, of the 16th century; and was besieged, captured, and ruined, in the civil wars of Charles I. The living is annexed to Tisbury; and the parish contains the Tisbury workhouse.

== Quarrying ==
The parish was noted for its quarrying, particularly Chilmark Stone, Tisbury Stone and Vale of Wardour Stone. Chicksgrove Quarry was operated near Tisbury in the Vale of Wardour. The Purbeck beds in Wardour have long been abandoned.

== Notable people ==
- The Arundell baronetcy
- Lucy Neville-Rolfe (born at Wardour in 1953), senior civil servant, businesswoman and politician
- Nicholas Hyde (born at Wardour c.1572), Lord Chief Justice of England
