= Bertinistrasse =

Street in Potsdam, Germany

- Bertinistrasse
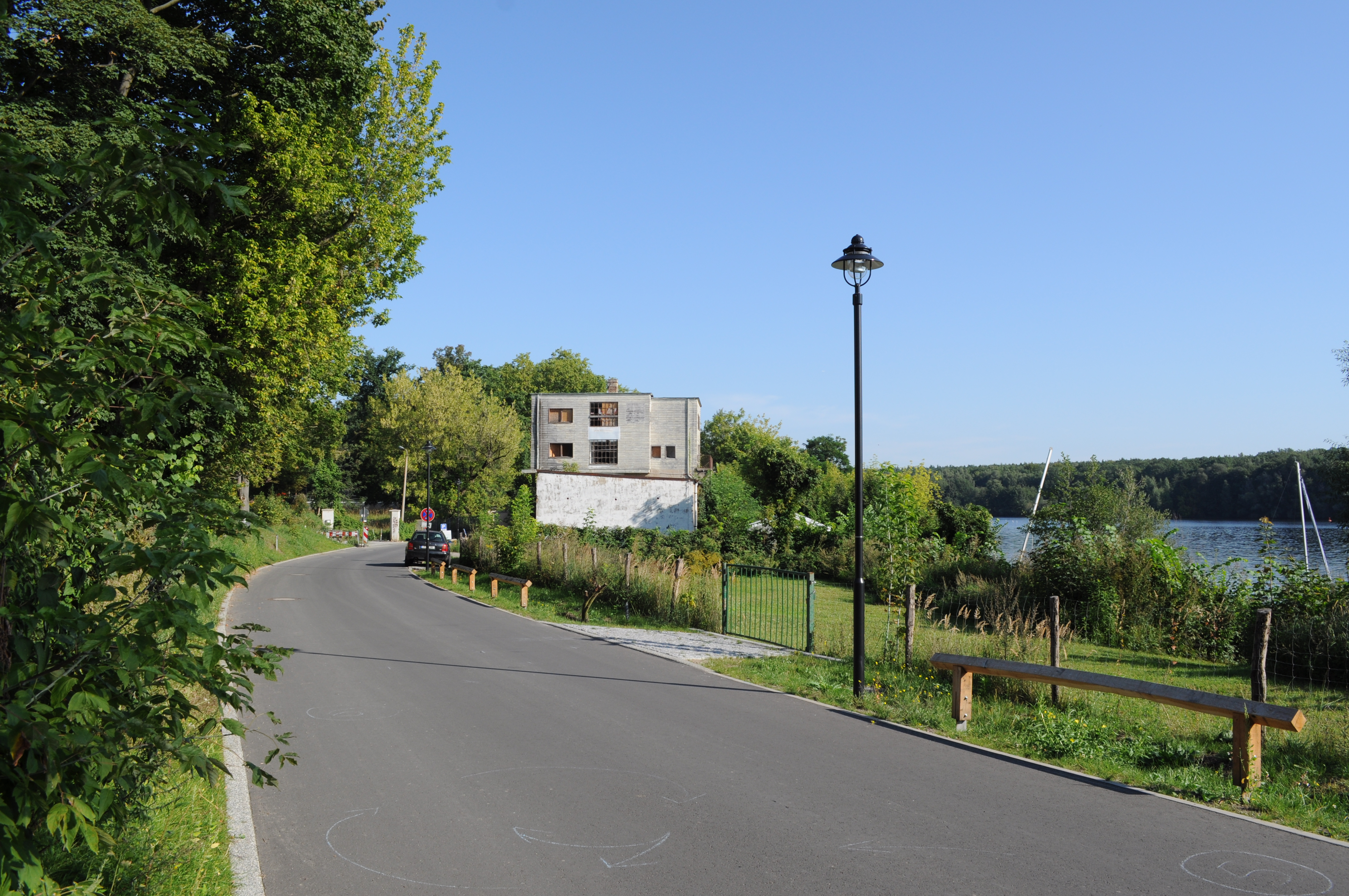
- Villa Hagen on Bertinistrasse, September 2012
- Type: Street
- Location: Potsdam, Germany

Bertinistrasse, or Bertinistraße (see ß), is a street near Potsdam, Germany, that runs along the Jungfernsee. Between the 1830s and the 1930s, the street was popular with industrialists and bankers in the greater Berlin region who built large villas along the lake. During the Holocaust, Jewish residents were persecuted by the Nazis and their properties were confiscated. Located within East Germany from 1949 until 1961, the street was later within West Germany from 1961 to 1990.

== History ==
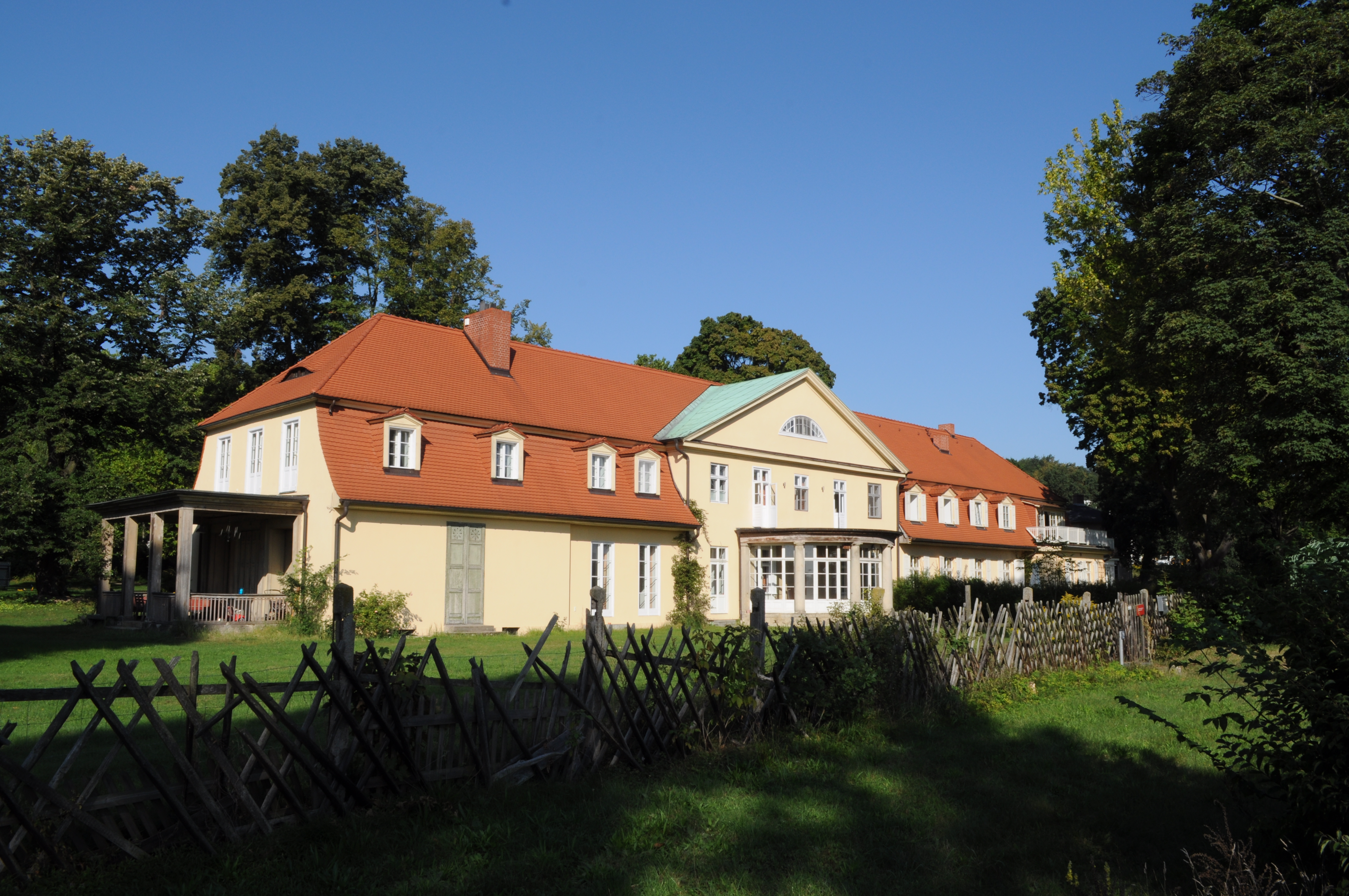
Villa Mendelssohn Bartholdy, Potsdam, 2012.

During the early 20th century, many prominent German industrialists and bankers purchased homes along Bertinistrasse and converted them into stately villas and summer homes. A significant number of residents were Jewish and their properties were confiscated by the Nazi regime. The properties were not returned by the Communist government of East Germany. The buildings on the street became the state property of East Germany in 1949. The Potsdam City Council, the Ministry for State Security, and Border Regiment No. 44 used the properties as a customs house and as barracks. Other buildings were converted into grocery stores, a data center, and a nursing home.

== Buildings ==
Jewish residents whose properties were confiscated included those of Herbert M. Gutmann, the Hagen family, the Mendelssohn family.

=== Villa Mendelssohn Bartholdy ===
Villa Mendelssohn Bartholdy was owned by members of one of Germany's most well-known Jewish families, ancestors of whom included the philosopher Moses Mendelssohn and his grandson the composer Felix Mendelssohn Bartholdy. Expropriated by the Nazis during the Nazi Aryanization program in the 1930s, Villa Mendelssohn Bartholdy became a dormitory in East Germany for athletes at Potsdam's Academy of Sports. In the 1990s, the villa came under the management of Matthias Schieckel, one of the last remaining heirs of the Mendelssohn family, who allowed the villa to be used as a cheap crash pad for affluent students at the University of Potsdam. The students used to the villa to host parties.

=== Villa Louis Hagen / House Udröst ===
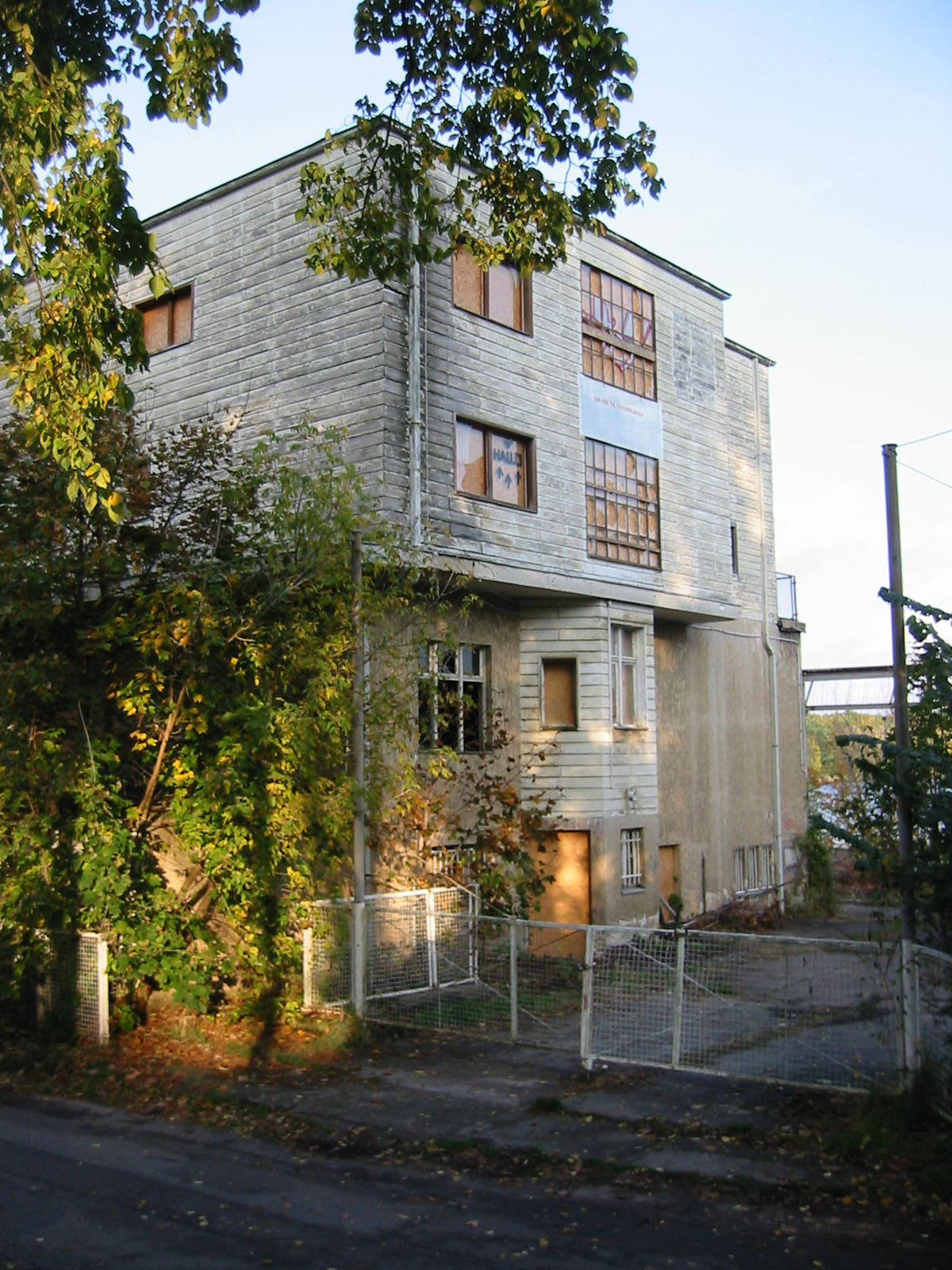
Villa Hagen, October 2005.

Villa Hagen was owned by the banker Louis Hagen, who was from a Cologne banking family. Members of the Hagen family have included the bankers Carl Levy and Hermann Carl Hagen, the writer Hans Oliva-Hagen, and the singer Nina Hagen. Confiscated by the Nazis in the 1930s, the villa later became state property of East Germany. In 1969, the villa became a data center. Ownership of the building has changed hands several times since the 1990s.

=== Villa Jacobs / Villa Alexander ===
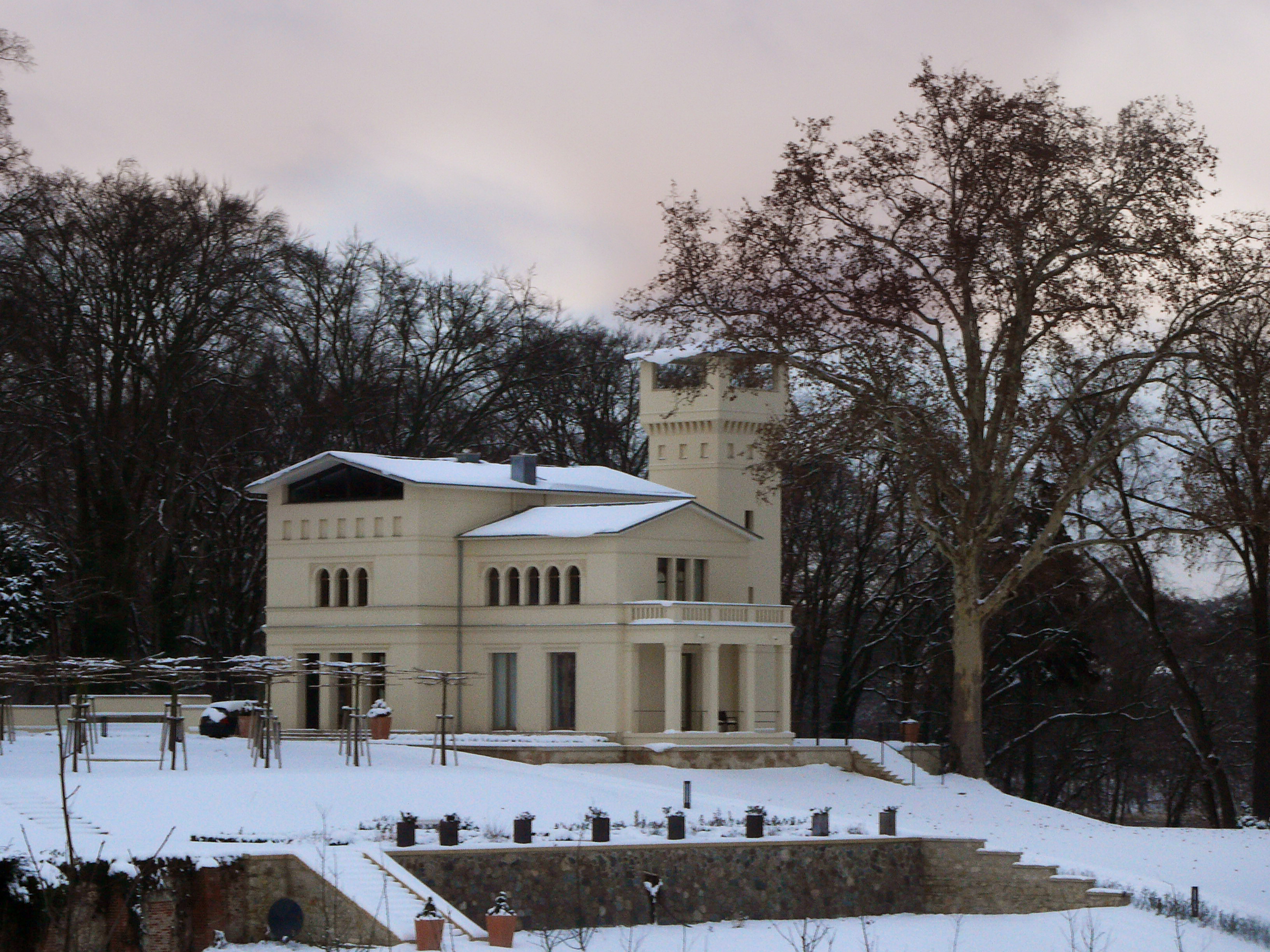
Villa Jacobs, January 2010.

The garden at Villa Alexander has been added to the UNESCO list of World Heritage Sites in Germany in 1999.

== See also ==
- Aryanization
- Nazi plunder
