= Herbert M. Gutmann =

German Jewish banker and art collector (1879–1942)

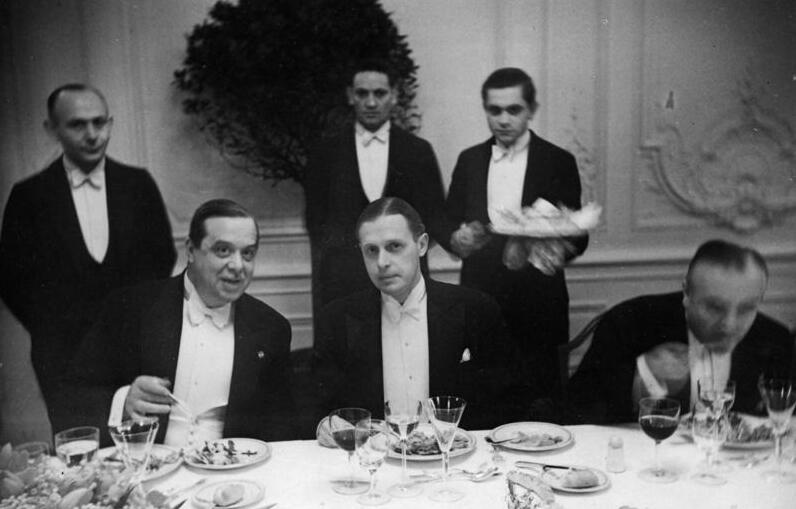
Gutmann (right) at the reception evening of the Italian ambassador Orsini-Baroni at the Hotel "Esplanade" (1930)

Herbert Max Magnus Gutmann (* October 15, 1879 in Dresden; died December 22, 1942 in Paignton, United Kingdom) was a German banker and collector of Islamic art, persecuted by the Nazis because of his Jewish heritage.

== Professional life ==
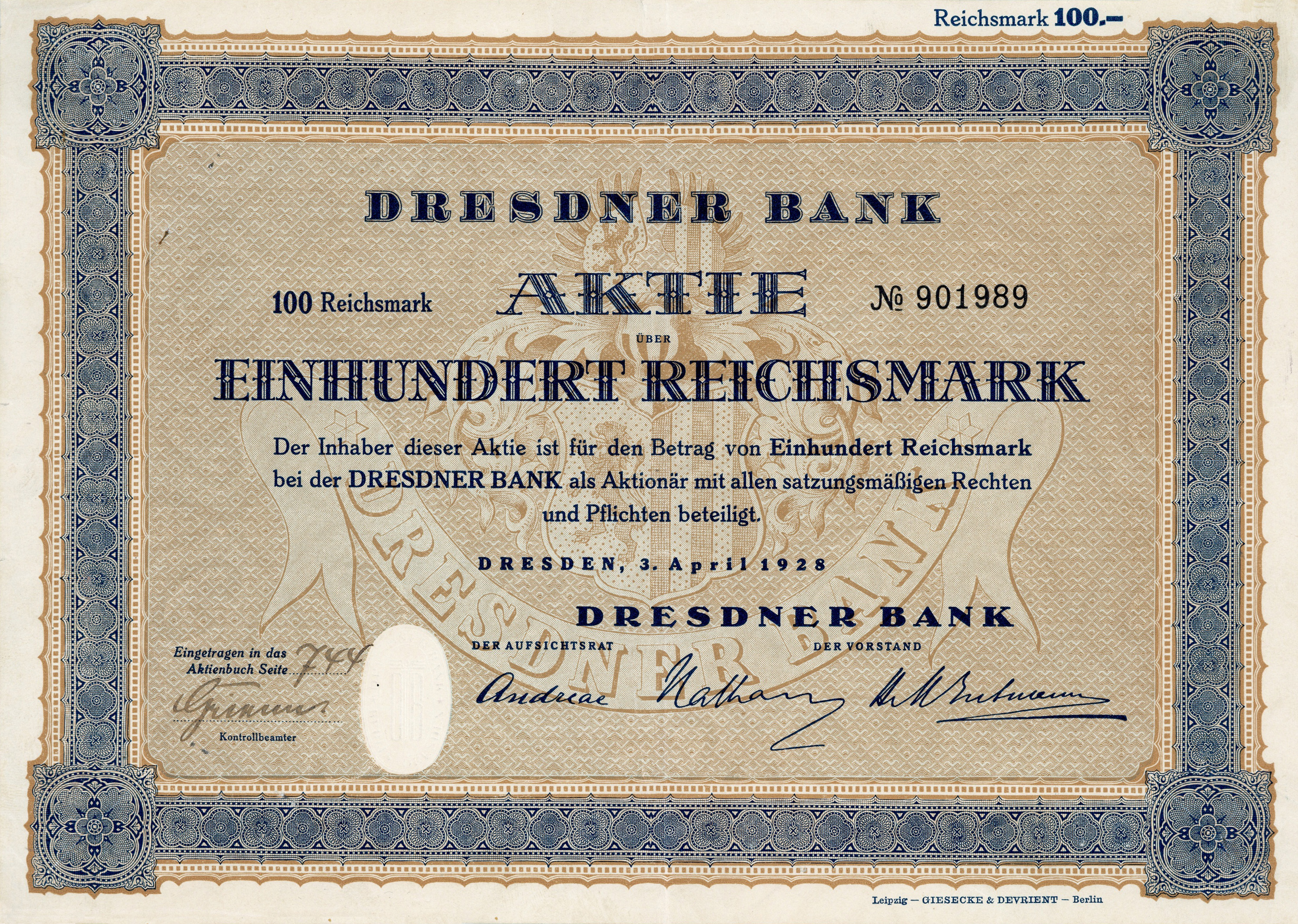
Dresdner Bank share for 100 Reichsmark, issued on April 3, 1928, in Dresden, with the signature of banker Franz Friedrich Andreae as Chairman of the Supervisory Board. The share bears the signatures of Henry Nathan and Herbert M. Gutmann on behalf of the Management Board.

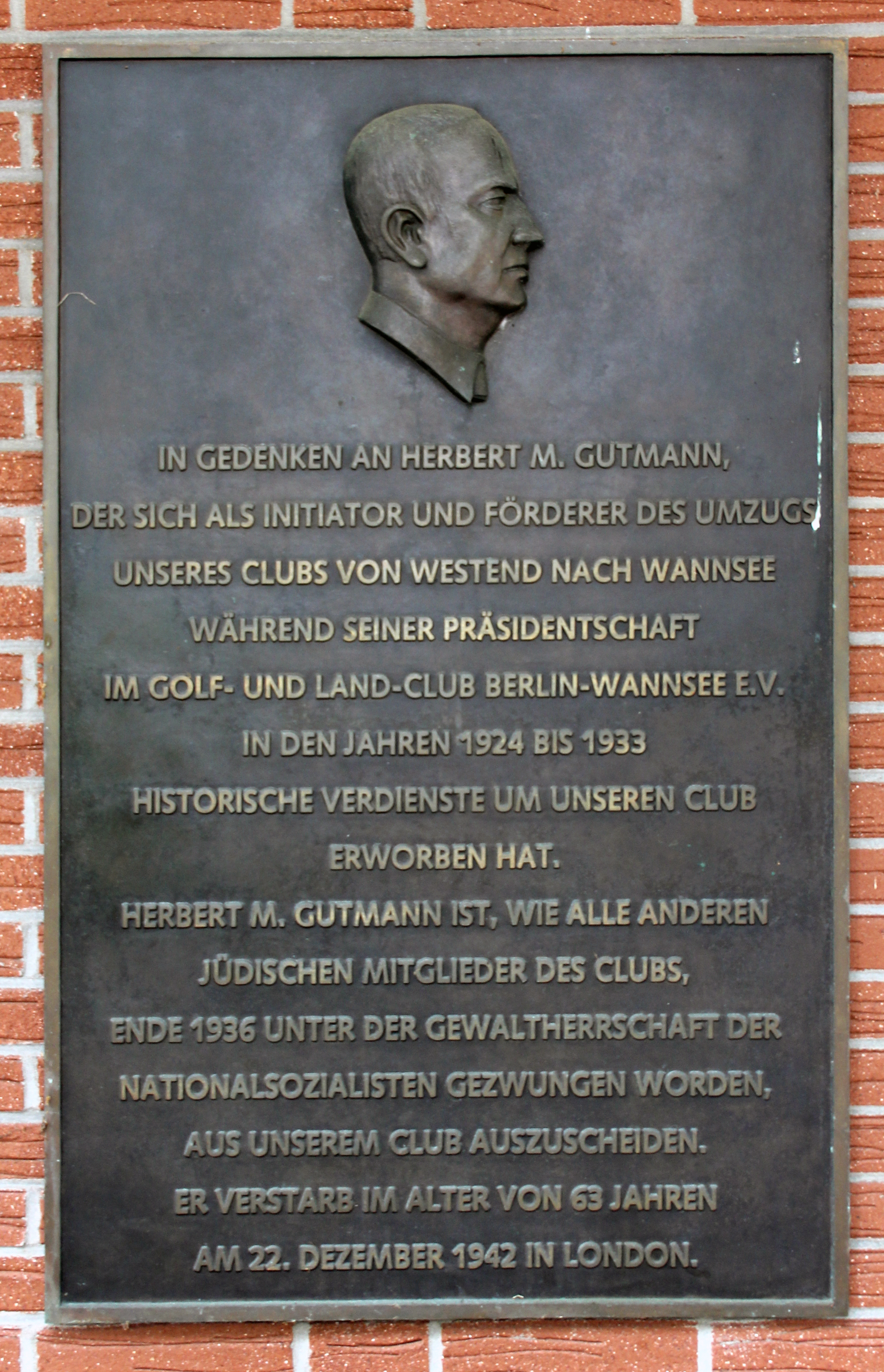
Memorial plaque on the house, Golfweg 22, in Berlin-Wannsee

Son of Dresdner Bank board member Eugen Gutmann, Herbert Gutmann studied economics before joining Dresdner Bank. As co-founder, director and later president of the Deutsche Orientbank, he was involved in the economic activities of the German Empire in the Orient in the period before the First World War. As part of this business activity, he traveled extensively between 1905 and 1910, including to Morocco, Egypt, Syria, Asia Minor and Persia. In 1910, he was elected to the Board of Dresdner Bank. In the same year, he joined the Society of Friends.

Gutmann was President of the Berlin-Wannsee Golf and Country Club. 1913 he leased a villa from Dr. Ernst Heller in Bertinistrasse in Potsdam, which he bought in 1919 and subsequently extended. The country-style villa with 80 rooms was initially his summer residence and he later settled there with his family.

Gutman was an important German banker in the 1920s. There are indications that Gutmann was forced out of his position as a concession to the emerging National Socialists. At the same time, however, Siegmund Bodenheimer and Samuel Ritscher were appointed to the new Board of Directors, although, unlike Gutmann, whose father had converted from Judaism to Christianity in 1889, they were Jewish.

== Nazi era ==
Gutmann still held 16 supervisory board mandates in 1933, when the Nazis first came to power, but he was then gradually ousted under Nazi anti-Jewish laws because of his Jewish origins. Forced to pay the confiscatory anti-Jewish Reichsfluchtsteuer (Reich Capital Flight Tax) and Judenvermögensabgabe (Tax on Registered Jewish Assets), he emigrated after 1936 and finally arrived in England, where he died in 1942, impoverished.

== Art collector ==
Inspired by his art-loving father Gutmann became a knowledgeable collector of oriental and East Asian art objects. During the Nazi era he would be forced to sell the collection at auction after the Nazis removed him from his positions and imposed special taxes on him.

He was president of the German-Persian Society and an external expert for the Islamic department of the Kaiser Friedrich Museum in Berlin (now the Museum of Islamic Art in the Pergamon Museum).

The most important object in Gutmann's collection was a wooden paneling in the Turkish Rococo style acquired in Damascus, which is still preserved and was referred to in the family as Arabicum. Even in the Middle East, interiors of this type have become very rare. As early as the 19th century, economic and social changes began to affect living habits and the design of homes. Some interiors found their way into public and private collections, but the Second World War was one of the reasons for their loss. Today, Syrian rooms can only be found in a few museums outside the Arab world.

== Claims for restitution of Nazi looted art ==
Gutmann owned a portrait of Bismarck by Franz von Lenbach until 1934; looted by the Nazis, it was restituted in 2010. The painting Pappenheim's Death by Hans Makart, also looted, was restituted to Gutmann's heirs in 2009.

In 2020 the UK Spoliation Commission rejected a claim by Gutmann for a Rubens, The Coronation of the Virgin, located at the Courtauld Institute.

In 2019 the Dutch Restitutions Committee recommended the restitution of fourteen Meissen porcelain objects.

Herbert's younger brother Friedrich had been appointed by their father as managing director of the British branch of Dresdner Bank in London and from 1918 ran the branch of Dresdner Bank in Amsterdam under the name Proehl & Gutmann. As Eugen Gutmann's youngest son after his brother Herbert, he became the family trustee of his father's collection.

== Literature ==
- Thomas Tunsch: Die syrische Innenraumdekoration in der ehemaligen Villa Gutmann in Potsdam. Untersuchungen zur Herkunft und Datierung. In: Staatliche Museen zu Berlin (Hrsg.): Forschungen und Berichte 29/30, 1990, S. 129–147 (Digitalisat).
- Roland Mascherek: Die Gutmann-Villa Bertinistr. 16–16a. Baugeschichtliche und einwohnerbiographische Dokumentation unter besonderer Berücksichtigung der Person Herbert M. Gutmann und seiner Familie. In: Mitteilungen der Studiengemeinschaf Sanssouci e. V. Verein für Kultur und Geschichte Potsdam 5, 2000, Nr. 2, S. 28–66.
- Atje Uta Hartmann: Die Villa Gutmann. Gedanken zu einer möglichen Nutzung. In: Brandenburgische Denkmalpflege 11, 2002, Heft 2, S. 43–62.
- Thomas Tunsch: Der Sammler Herbert M. Gutmann (1879–1942). In: Jens Kröger, Désirée Heiden (Hrsg.): Islamische Kunst in Berliner Sammlungen. 100 Jahre Museum für Islamische Kunst in Berlin. Staatliche Museen zu Berlin, Berlin 2004, ISBN 3-86601-435-X, S. 27–30 (Digitalisat).
- Vivian J. Rheinheimer (Hrsg.): Herbert M. Gutmann 1879–1942. Bankier in Berlin. Bauherr in Potsdam. Kunstsammler. Koehler & Amelang, Leipzig 2007, ISBN 3-7338-0351-5; (Rezension).

== See also ==
- The Holocaust in the Netherlands
- Hermann Goering
- Aryanization
- List of claims for restitution for Nazi-looted art
- Friedrich Gutmann
