= Menard Press =

Small press publisher founded in 1969

The Menard Press is a small-press independent publisher founded by Anthony Rudolf. It started as a magazine in 1969 and published its first book in 1971. Today, Menard Press is an imprint run by publisher Elte Rauch.

The Menard Press has specialised in literary translation, mainly poetry. In addition to literary texts – original and translated poetry, original and translated fiction, non-fiction, art and literary criticism – the press has published essays on the nuclear issue (by Sir Martin Ryle and Lord Zuckerman, among others) as well as works and testimonies by survivors of Nazism, including the first English edition of Primo Levi's poems.

In 2007, the press announced they would be publishing their last book, but would continue to be engaged in the literary and cultural field.

In 2021, Menard Press resumed its publishing work under the direction of Elte Rauch, who lives and works between the Netherlands and the United Kingdom. In Amsterdam, she runs the independent publishing house HetMoet.

She continues Rudolf's legacy and adds feminism, science, internationalism and social justice to the press’ portfolio. Elte aims to sustainably reissue out-of-print titles as well as to offer new and contemporary Menard Press publications to a growing and variable audience, in both the United Kingdom and the Netherlands.

The first publication of the revived Menard Press imprint is On Being Ill, an anthology created during the COVID-19 pandemic, with the collaboration of authors and editors around the world in times of lockdown. Among the authors are classics such as Virginia Woolf and Audre Lorde, as well as contemporary writers Nadia de Vries, Deryn-Rees Jones, Lieke Marsman, Jameisha Prescod, Sinéad Gleeson, Nafissa Thompson-Spires and Mieke van Zonneveld.
