= Henry Arundell, 8th Baron Arundell of Wardour =

English peer and landowner (1740–1808)

The Right Honourable The Lord Arundell of Wardour
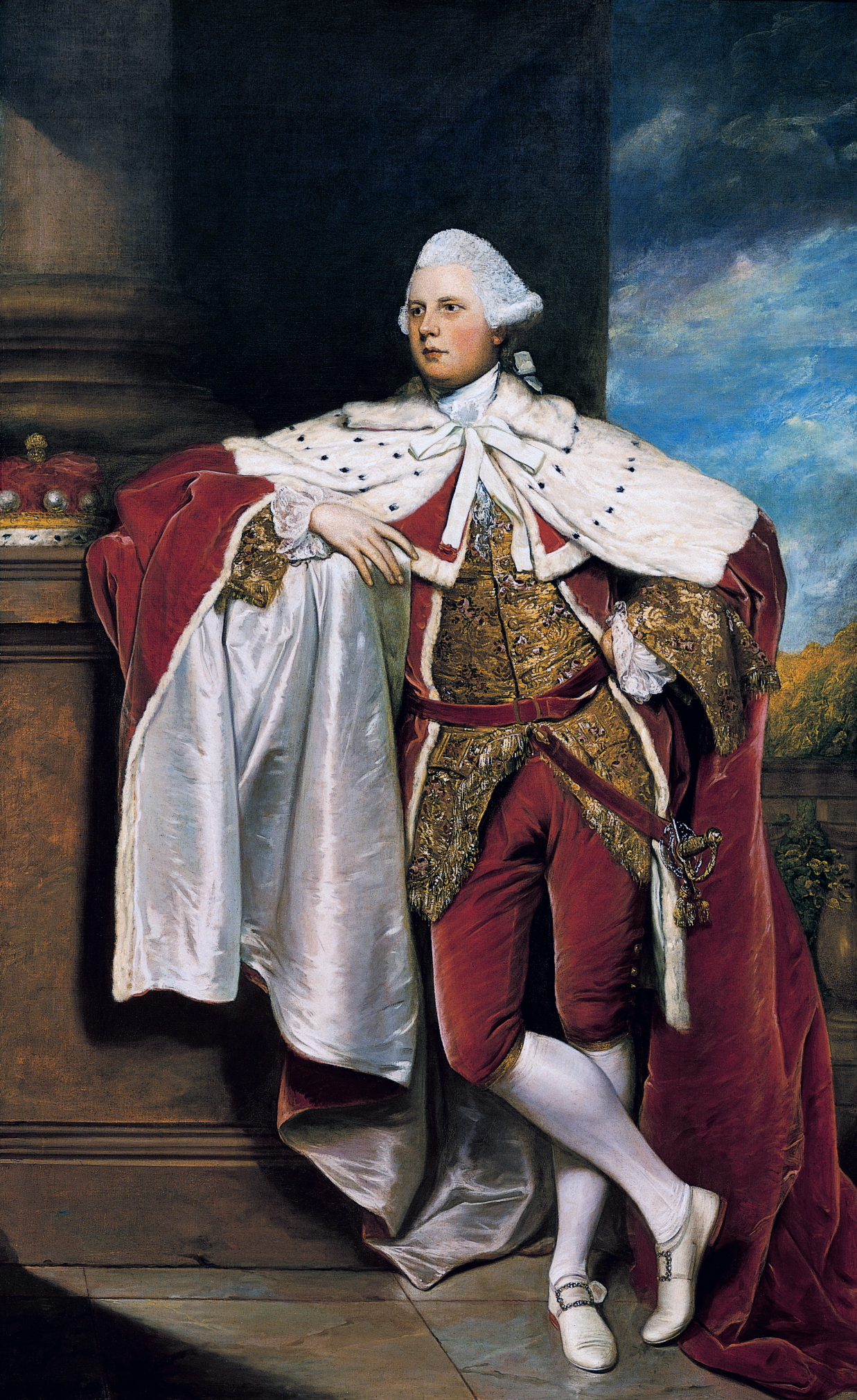
- 1764 portrait by Joshua Reynolds
- Born: 31 March 1740; England
- Died: 4 December 1808 (aged 68); England
- Spouse: Mary Christina Conquest Arundell
- Children: 2
- Parents: Henry Arundell, 7th Baron Arundell of Wardour (father); Mary Christina Arundell (mother)

Henry Arundell, 8th Baron Arundell of Wardour (31 March 1740 – 4 December 1808) was an English peer and landowner.

== Biography ==
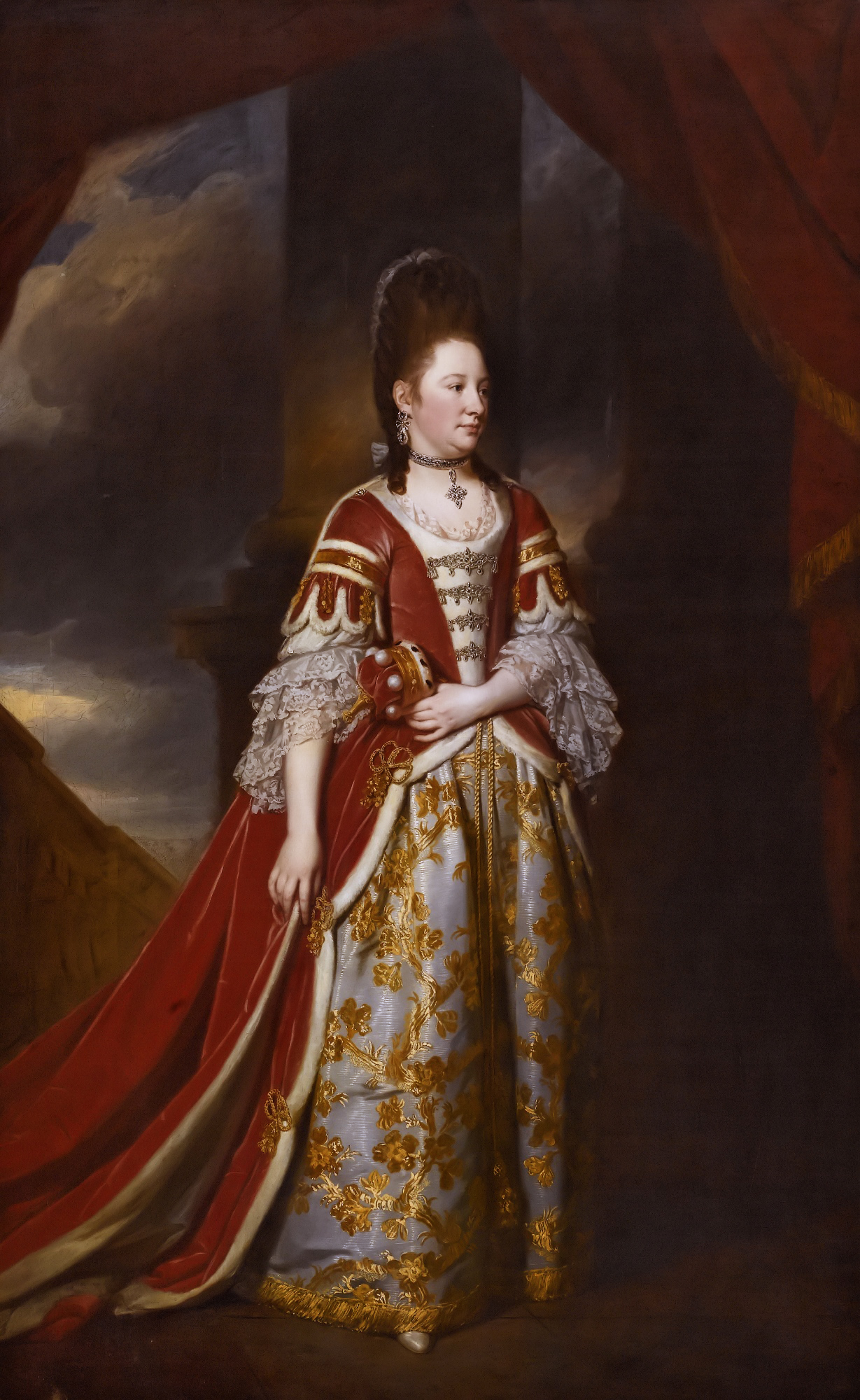
Portrait of his wife, Mary (by George Romney)

Henry Arundell was born on 31 March 1740, to Henry Arundell and Mary Bellings-Arundell.

He married Mary Christina Conquest, the daughter of Benedict Conquest of Irnham Hall and Mary Ursula Markham, on 31 May 1763. They had a London home in Grosvenor Square. They had two daughters: Mary Christina (1764–1805), who married James Everard Arundell, 9th Baron Arundell of Wardour, and Eleanor Mary (1766–1835), who married Charles Clifford, 6th Baron Clifford of Chudleigh.

An avid collector of art, he accumulated immense debts in building and furnishing New Wardour Castle, Wiltshire, designed in the Palladian style by Giacomo Quarenghi. A portrait was painted of him by Sir Joshua Reynolds.

He died on 4 December 1808, aged 68. After his death, his trustees were forced to sell off a portion of his lands in Dorset.

== See also ==
- Baron Arundell of Wardour

Peerage of England
Preceded by Henry Arundell	Baron Arundell of Wardour; 1756–1808	Succeeded by James Arundell
