= Baron Arundell of Wardour =

Extinct barony in the Peerage of England

Arms of Arundel of Lanherne, Cornwall & Wardour Castle: Sable, six martlets argent. These are early canting arms, based on the French for swallow hirondelle. They were recorded for Reinfred de Arundel (d. circa 1280), lord of the manor of Lanherne, Cornwall, in the 15th-century Shirley Roll of Arms

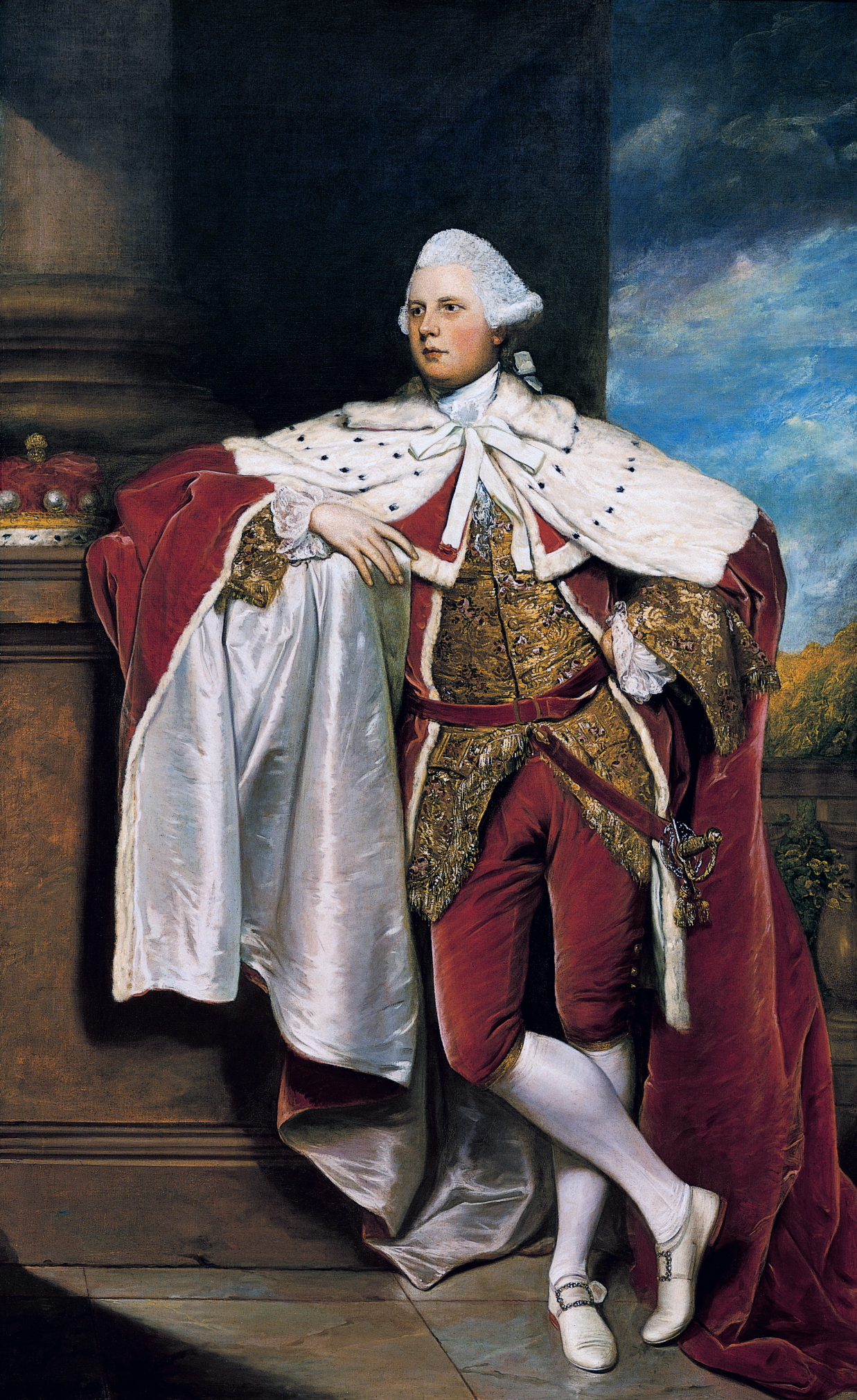
Henry Arundell, 8th Baron Arundell of Wardour, by Sir Joshua Reynolds.

Baron Arundell of Wardour, in the County of Wiltshire, was a title in the Peerage of England. It was created in 1605 for Thomas Arundell, known as "Thomas the Valiant", son of Sir Matthew Arundell (died 1598) and grandson of Sir Thomas Arundell (executed 1552) and of Margaret Howard, a sister of Queen Katherine Howard. According to Agnes Strickland, Margaret Howard, Lady Arundel had been a Lady Attendant to Katherine Howard, her sister, during the time she was queen. Arundell had already been created a Count of the Holy Roman Empire by Rudolph II in December 1595 (see below). He was succeeded by his son, the second Baron, who fought as a Royalist in the Civil War and was mortally wounded at the Battle of Stratton in 1643. His son, the third Baron, was implicated in the Popish Plot and imprisoned in the Tower of London for six years. However, after the accession of James II he was restored to favour and served as Lord Privy Seal from 1687 to 1688. His great-great-great-grandson, the eighth Baron (the title having descended from father to son), was an avid collector of art and accumulated immense debts in building and furnishing New Wardour Castle.

He had no sons and was succeeded by his cousin, the ninth Baron. He was the son of the Hon. James Everard Arundell, younger son of the sixth Baron. On his death the titles passed to his eldest son, the tenth Baron. He voted against the Reform Bill 1832, the only Catholic peer to do so. He was childless and was succeeded by his younger brother, the eleventh Baron. Two of the eleventh Baron's son, the twelfth and thirteenth Barons, succeeded in the title. The latter was a Roman Catholic priest. On the thirteenth Baron's death the title passed to his third cousin once removed, the fourteenth Baron. He was the great-grandson of Thomas Raymond Arundell, younger son of the aforementioned the Hon. James Everard Arundell, younger son of the sixth Baron. He died childless and was succeeded by his younger brother, the fifteenth Baron. When he died the titles passed to his son, the sixteenth Baron, who died from effects of service in 1944 during the Second World War. On his death the barony became extinct.

John Richard Arundell, 10th Baron Talbot de Malahide (born 1931) is the son of Reginald John Arthur Talbot, who in 1945 assumed by Royal licence the surname and arms of Arundell, and who was the great-grandson of Admiral The Hon. Sir John Talbot and his wife Mabile Mary Arundell, daughter of Hon. Robert Arthur Arundell, fourth son of James Everard Arundell, 9th Baron Arundell of Wardour and Charlotte Stuart Parkin, youngest daughter of Dr. Henry Parkin, RN, Inspector-General of Hospitals and Fleets.

The Barons took their title from Wardour Castle in Wiltshire, which is now partially ruined.

== Barons Arundell of Wardour (1605) ==
- Thomas Arundell, 1st Baron Arundell of Wardour (1560–1639)
- Thomas Arundell, 2nd Baron Arundell of Wardour (1586–1643)
- Henry Arundell, 3rd Baron Arundell of Wardour (d. 1694)
- Thomas Arundell, 4th Baron Arundell of Wardour (1633–1712)
- Henry Arundell, 5th Baron Arundell of Wardour (d. 1726)
- Henry Arundell, 6th Baron Arundell of Wardour (1694–1746)
- Henry Arundell, 7th Baron Arundell of Wardour (1717–1756)
- Henry Arundell, 8th Baron Arundell of Wardour (1740–1808)
- James Everard Arundell, 9th Baron Arundell of Wardour (1763–1817)
- James Everard Arundell, 10th Baron Arundell of Wardour (1785–1834)
- Henry Benedict Arundell, 11th Baron Arundell of Wardour (1804–1862)
- John Francis Arundell, 12th Baron Arundell of Wardour (1831–1906)
- Everard Aloysius Gonzaga Arundell, 13th Baron Arundell of Wardour (1834–1907)
- Edgar Clifford Arundell, 14th Baron Arundell of Wardour (1859–1921)
- Gerald Arthur Arundell, 15th Baron Arundell of Wardour (1861–1939)
- John Francis Arundell, 16th Baron Arundell of Wardour (1907–1944)

== Counts Arundell of Wardour in the Holy Roman Empire ==
In 1595, Thomas Arundell, later to become the first Baron Arundell of Wardour, was created a hereditary Count of the Holy Roman Empire by the Emperor Rudolph II for his military service in Hungary against the Turks. This grant occasioned much controversy on his return to England over its effect on his English precedence and the legitimacy of foreign titles in England.

The Arundell family thus held titles of nobility from different countries, governed by different rules. While their English titles normally descend according to strict primogeniture, the title of Count under the law of the Holy Roman Empire (and its successor states) belonged equally to all male-line descendants of the original grantee in perpetuity; all male-line descendants of Thomas Arundell were thus sometimes styled "Count" (German: Graf), while female family members were styled "Countess" (Gräfin).

== See also ==
- Arundell family
- Baron Talbot of Malahide
