= Ratford =

Hamlet in Wiltshire, England

Coordinates: 51.443°N 2.024°W

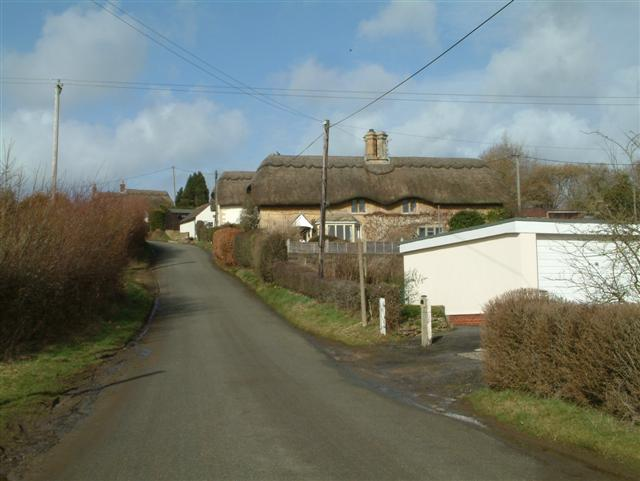
Ratford

Ratford is a hamlet near Calne in the county of Wiltshire, England, with a population of approximately 50.

The hamlet lies in Bremhill parish, around 0.7 miles (1 km) north of the A4 national route, 1.25 miles (2 km) northwest of Calne on a minor road towards Bremhill, 0.6 miles (1 km) away. Other nearby settlements include the villages of Derry Hill and Studley.

The hamlet surrounds a crossing of the Cowage Brook, a tributary of the River Marden; the Cowage Brook is joined here by Fisher's Brook. Until Bremhill parish was enlarged in 2025, the land to the south of the Cowage Brook was in Calne Without parish.

The first houses were probably built here in the late 17th century or early 18th. The single-arch stone bridge over the brook is probably from the late 18th century. Some cottages were built in the 19th century by the Bowood estate.

The name Rattle was used in the past, appearing on the 1925 Ordnance Survey map, but by 1938 the name Ratford was in use.

The local pub is the Dumb Post Inn, on the north side of Ratford on the lane to Bremhill. Between 1900 and c. 1970 there was a Baptist mission room near the brook.
