= A342 road =

Road in southern England

A342

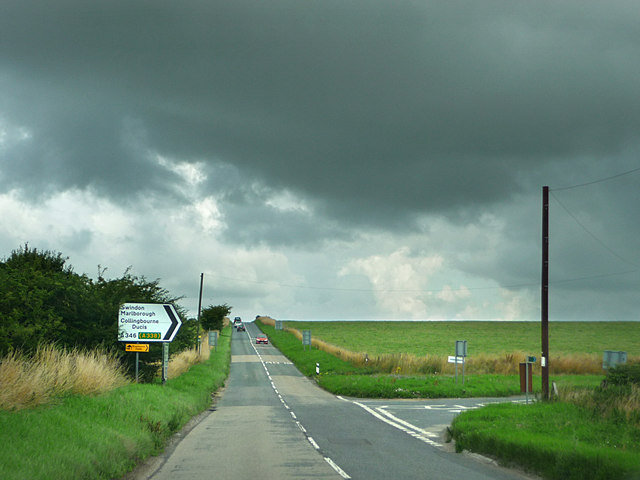
- The junction between the A342 and the A346

Route information
- Length: 33 mi (53 km)

Major junctions
- North West end: Derry Hill; 51.4380°N 2.0716°W
- A4 A3102 A361 A360 A345 A338 A3026 A343 A303
- South East end: Andover; 51.2112°N 1.5164°W

Location
- Country: United Kingdom
- Constituent country: England

Road network
- Roads in the United Kingdom; Motorways; A and B road zones
← A341	→ A343

The A342 is an A road in England that runs from Pewsham near Chippenham, Wiltshire to Andover, Hampshire.

== Route ==
The road begins at the A4 junction just outside the small village of Pewsham, to the east of Chippenham. It heads south past the village of Derry Hill towards Devizes, briefly meeting the A3102 near Sandy Lane. Just outside Devizes the road meets the A361, and once in the centre of town it meets the A360. Continuing southeast in the Vale of Pewsey, under the northern slope of Salisbury Plain, the road reaches Upavon where it meets the A345 and turns east, over the Plain. After passing through Everleigh the road meets the A338 before entering Ludgershall and meeting the A3026. The final part of the route travels southeast where the road ends at a roundabout with the A343 and A303 just outside Andover.

== Settlements on route ==
- Pewsham
- Derry Hill
- Devizes
- Sandy Lane
- Upavon
- Everleigh
- Ludgershall
- Andover
