= Fisher's Brook =

Hamlet in Wiltshire, England

Coordinates: 51.4544°N 2.0111°W

Fisher's Brook is a hamlet in Bremhill parish, Wiltshire, England, with a population of approximately 25. It consists of a small number of houses just south of the bridge over Fisher's Brook on the minor road from Calne to Whitley and Bremhill.

Fisher's Brook is signposted from the A3102 Calne bypass and lies some 1.2 miles (1.9 km) to the north-west of the centre of the town.

The brook flows into the Cowage Brook (a tributary of the River Marden) further west at Ratford.
