= Frank Pullein =

English organist and composer

Frank Pullein (1871 – 1 March 1954) was an English organist and composer. After serving as assistant organist at Lincoln Cathedral, he became organist of St Giles' Church, Wrexham, in 1895 and remained in the post until his death in 1954.

== Life ==
He was born in 1871, the son of William Pullein and Hannah Rose. His father was a Professor of Music.

His three brothers, William Rose Pullein, John Pullein and Ernest Pullein were also organists.

He was in the choir of Lincoln Cathedral as a boy, and then an articled pupil of John Matthew Wilson Young and then assistant organist.

He moved to Wrexham in 1895 where he stayed until his death in 1954.

== Appointments ==
- Assistant organist at Lincoln Cathedral 1893 - 1894
- Organist of St Giles' Church, Wrexham 1895 - 1954

== Compositions ==
He composed:

- A Solemn March 1904
