= William Rose Pullein =

William Rose Pullein (1865 – 8 November 1945) was an organist and composer based in England.

== Life ==
He was born in 1865, the son of William Pullein and Hannah Rose. His father was a Professor of Music and his maternal grandfather, William Rose, was a piano dealer in Lincoln.

His three younger brothers, Frank Pullein, John Pullein and Ernest Pullein were also organists.

He was an articled organ pupil at Lincoln Cathedral. He was also Organist to the Marquis of Lansdowne, and H.G. Harris Esq.

When in Calne, he was conductor of the Calne Musical Society and Chippenham Amateur Orchestra.

== Appointments ==
- Assistant organist at Lincoln Cathedral
- Organist of St. Andrew's Church, Lincoln
- Organist at St Mary's Church, Calne, Wiltshire

== Compositions ==
He composed:

- A New Collection of Hymn Tunes 1922
- O Lord, support us all the Day 1925
- O Arglwydd, cadw ni trwy hir ddydd. Gweddi yr xvi ganrif. xvi Century Prayer. 1927
