= Derry Hill & Studley =

Civil parish in Wiltshire, England

Coordinates: 51.44°N 2.06°W

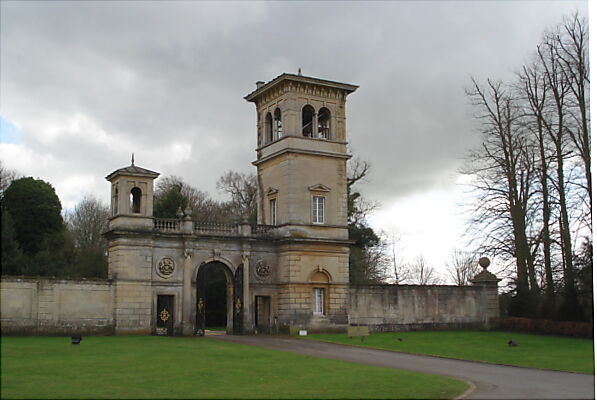
- Entrance to the Bowood estate

- Location within Wiltshire
- Population: 1,400 (electors, approx, in 2022)
- OS grid reference: ST9671
- Civil parish: Derry Hill & Studley
- Unitary authority: Wiltshire
- Ceremonial county: Wiltshire
- Region: South West
- Country: England
- Sovereign state: United Kingdom
- Post town: CALNE
- Postcode district: SN11
- Dialling code: 01249
- Police: Wiltshire
- Fire: Dorset and Wiltshire
- Ambulance: South Western
- UK Parliament: Chippenham; Melksham and Devizes
- Website: Parish Council

Derry Hill & Studley is a civil parish in Wiltshire, England, covering the villages of Derry Hill, Studley and Sandy Lane and the hamlet of Pewsham, as well as the country house estate of Bowood. The parish lies immediately west of Calne and southeast of Chippenham. The parish of Calne Without was created in 1890; boundary changes effective from May 2025 reduced its size and renamed the remaining part as Derry Hill & Studley.

The River Marden flows through the parish from its source near Calstone Wellington.

== History ==
Until 2025, the parish was named Calne Without and also included the small villages of Calstone Wellington and Stockley; the dispersed settlement of Stock; the hamlets of Blackland, Broad's Green, Mile Elm and Theobald's Green; and part of the hamlet of Ratford and the former tithing of Calstone.

Calne Without was created in 1890 when the large Calne parish was divided. The municipal area became Calne Within parish and the remainder formed Calne Without, joined by the land of the abolished Blackland and Calstone Wellington parishes and the liberty of Bowood, and a small area of Bremhill parish. In 1934, Calne Without was reduced in size by transferring to Calne Within an area with a population of around 900, and transferring a smaller area to Cherhill. When Pewsham parish (to the west) was abolished in 1984, its rural area was transferred to Calne Without.

Wiltshire Council's Community Governance Review 2021/22 considered the creation of a new parish covering Derry Hill and Studley, which had both experienced large-scale housing development, and its impact on surrounding parishes. The final recommendation of the review was, rather than creating a new parish, to transfer the eastern parts of the parish to Bremhill, Heddington and Cherhill parishes. The parish of Calne Without would thus cover Derry Hill, Studley, Buck Hill, Pewsham, the Bowood estate, Sandy Lane and Whetham, and would be renamed as Derry Hill & Studley. The changes came into effect at the elections on 1 May 2025.

The parish spans two Westminster constituencies. Derry Hill, Studley and Pewsham are within the Chippenham constituency, while the southwestern part – including Sandy Lane – falls within Melksham and Devizes.
