= John Pullein =

British composer

John Pullein FRCO (b. 1878) was an organist and composer based in England.

== Life ==
He was born in Lincoln in 1878, the son of William Pullein and Hannah Rose. His father was a Professor of Music.

His three younger brothers, William Rose Pullein, Frank Pullein and Ernest Pullein were also organists.

He was in the choir of Lincoln Cathedral as a boy, and then an articled pupil of G.J. Bennett and then assistant organist.

== Appointments ==
- Organist of St. Helen's Church, Willingham by Stow
- Organist of St. Swithin's Church, Lincoln 1896 - 1903
- Organist of St. Peter's Church, Harrogate 1903 - 1917
- Organist of St. Mary's Cathedral, Glasgow 1917 - ????

== Compositions ==
He composed Songs, part songs, organ and church music.
