= Studley, Wiltshire =

Village in Wiltshire, England

Coordinates: 51.441°N 2.049°W

Studley
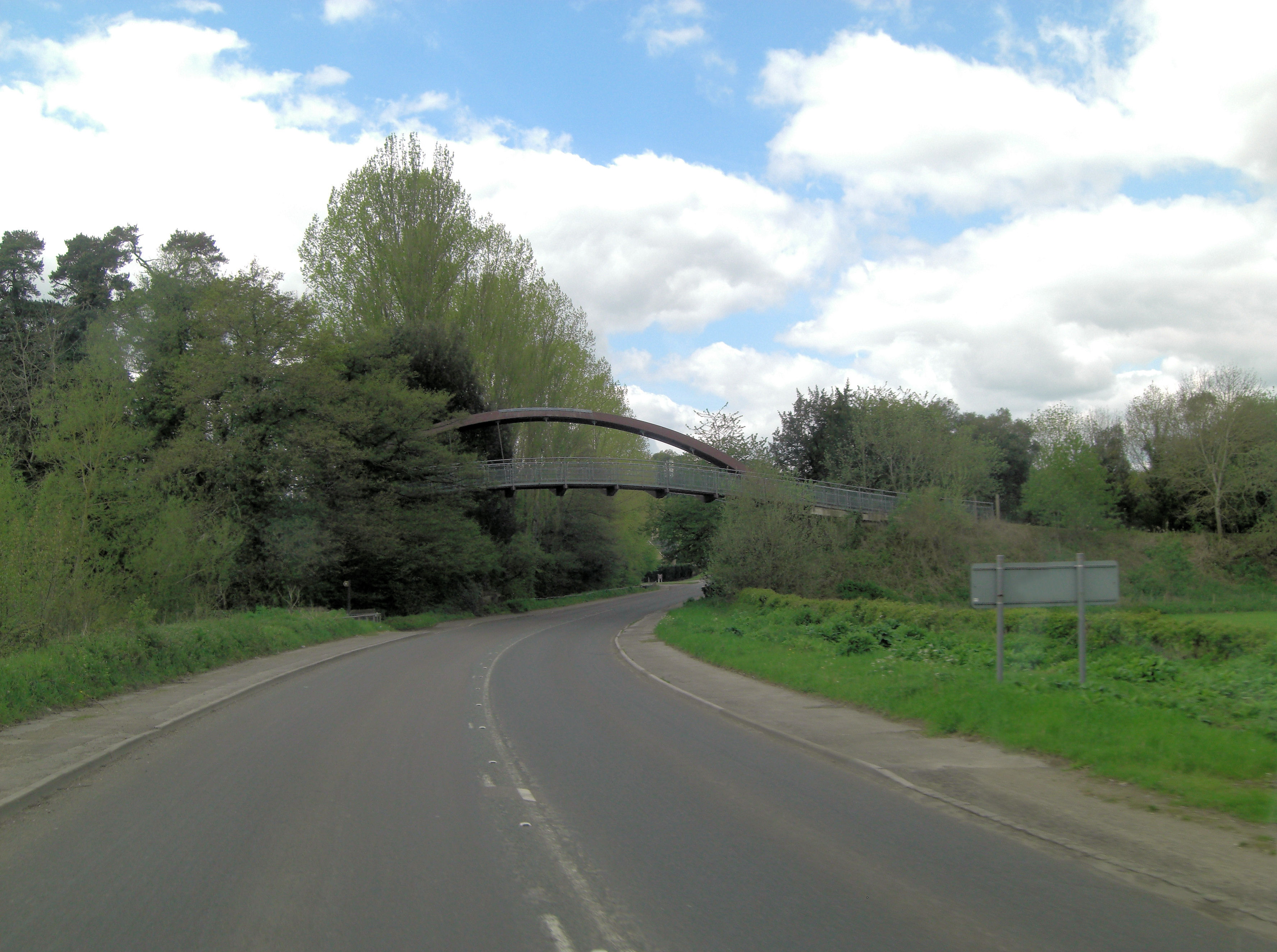
- Modern foot/cycle bridge over the A4 near Studley, on the route of the former railway branch line

- Location within Wiltshire
- OS grid reference: ST970711
- Civil parish: Derry Hill & Studley
- Unitary authority: Wiltshire
- Ceremonial county: Wiltshire
- Region: South West
- Country: England
- Sovereign state: United Kingdom
- Post town: Calne
- Postcode district: SN11
- Dialling code: 01249
- Police: Wiltshire
- Fire: Dorset and Wiltshire
- Ambulance: South Western
- UK Parliament: Chippenham
- Website: www.facebook.com/groups/600369440069349/

Studley is a small village in the county of Wiltshire, England, which lies between Chippenham and Calne. The village is part of the civil parish of Derry Hill & Studley.

== Geography ==
Studley is about 3 miles (5 km) south-east of the large town of Chippenham, and 2 miles (3 km) west of the smaller town of Calne. The centre of the village is about 500m north of the A4 national route which connects the two towns.

The Cocklemore Brook rises near the village.

Nearby villages include Derry Hill (close by on the other side of the A4), Bremhill, Pewsham, Stanley and Tytherton Lucas.

== History ==
An ancient road between Salisbury and Bristol passed nearby. There were Roman and Romano-British settlements in this area; Roman bricks, and evidence of iron working, can be found in a field on the highest point of the hill. At Buck Hill, south-east of the village, the remains of a Roman villa were found in 1753. Because of the forested nature of the area, settlements have always been scattered.

Studley itself is mentioned in 1175 and 1196, and it was closely associated with Stanley Abbey, half a mile to the north-west in Bremhill parish, until its dissolution in 1540.

The area was anciently part of Chippenham royal forest. The Wiltshire Victoria County History traces the ownership of Studley manor from the 13th century. It was bought by Edward Hungerford in 1468 and owned by many generations of his descendants. Notables include John (c.1560–1636), George (1637–1712) and Walter (1675–1754), all of whom were returned to Parliament for various seats. In 1803, Studley was among the estates inherited by Henrietta Maria Anna Walker-Hungerford (d.1820) who in 1807 married John Crewe, 2nd Baron Crewe (1772–1835), a landowner who rose to the rank of General in the army. Their son Hungerford Crewe (1812–1894) was recorded as holding c.175 acres at Studley; his estate passed to his nephew Robert Milnes, Baron Houghton, later Earl and Marquess of Crewe. In 1996, Robert's great-grandson Raymond O'Neill, Lord O'Neill owned c.160 acres at Studley.

Studley's manor house, north-east of the village, was lived in by members of the Hungerford family in the 18th century; it had formal gardens and stood in a small park, and was destroyed by fire c.1800. The nearby farmhouse built in rubble stone in the late 18th century still stands.

It is possible that a fulling mill existed in the early 13th century at the start of a local cloth industry. One was certainly standing in 1602, and by the middle of the 17th century, Hassell's Mill on the River Marden (north of Studley) was replaced by New Mill. This was converted to a corn mill in 1728 and continued working until the mid-20th century, being demolished in 1962.

The London-Bristol road meandered through the area now known as Derry Hill before descending steeply towards Chippenham. Between 1787 and 1810 a new, straighter section was built, with a gentler slope; it is still called New Road.

The Calne branch of the Wilts & Berks Canal was built north of the village, following the far bank of the River Marden, and was fully open by 1810. Traffic on the canal had ceased by the early years of the next century and it was formally abandoned in 1914; it has been under gradual restoration since the late 1990s.

Studley was included in the civil parish of Calne Without which was created by dividing the large Calne parish in 1890. Boundary changes which came into effect in May 2025 reduced the size of the parish and changed its name to Derry Hill & Studley.

The oldest surviving cottages are of stone and thatch, built in the 17th century. Between 1745 and the middle of the next century there was a Black Dog Inn, which gave its name to the hill, and later to Black Dog Halt on the Chippenham and Calne line, at the east end of the village. In 1761 a new pub called the Rose and Crown was opened; renamed the Soho Inn by 1830, it still had that name in 1999. In 2018 it reopened as The Black Dog Inn.

There was further building throughout the 19th century, chiefly along the roads and lanes, and even more houses appeared in the 20th century. Nevertheless, the community has remained scattered, largely agricultural with grassland, arable, and woodland. The houses had no mains drainage, gas, or electricity until after the Second World War.

=== Rumsey ===
A small estate south-east of Studley village became known as Rumsey's, and in the 18th century had a house called Studley House, just south of the junction of the later A4 road and Norley Lane. This was replaced in the early 19th century by an ashlar-faced farmhouse, with two and three storeys, a central square porch, and a wrought iron verandah along its south front. The house and estate were bought by the 5th Marquess of Lansdown in 1912, and the 8th Marquess sold the house in 1981. Now called Rumsey House, it was sold for £1 million in 2000. The two-storey stable block, in brick with ashlar dressings, is of similar date.

== Religious sites ==
Studley was anciently part of the large parish of St Mary's Church, Calne. A dependant chapel had been built at Studley by the 13th century, probably by the lord of the manor, but it had closed by c.1480. Villagers are likely to have used the church at the abbey; since 1540, and until the new parish church was built at Derry Hill in 1840, they had to travel to Bremhill for church services. A small red-brick Wesleyan Methodist chapel was built at the north end of Studley Lane in 1855, and a stone schoolroom added in 1896; the chapel remains in use.
