= Sandy Lane, Wiltshire =

Village in Wiltshire, England

Coordinates: 51.409°N 2.051°W

Sandy Lane
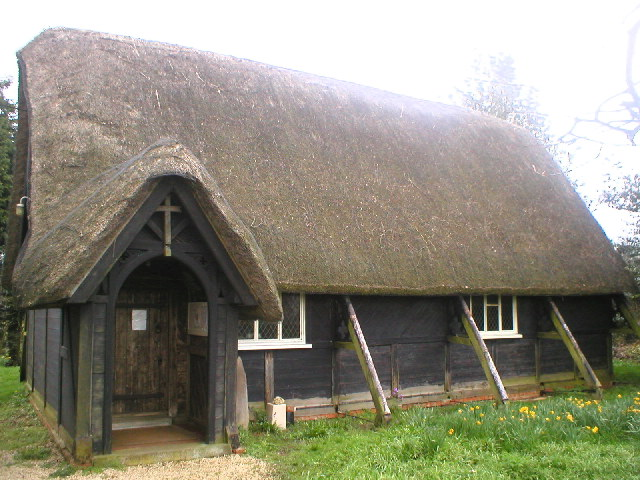
- St Mary & St Nicholas Church

- Location within Wiltshire
- Population: 32 (2011 census)
- OS grid reference: ST966678
- Civil parish: Derry Hill & Studley
- Unitary authority: Wiltshire
- Ceremonial county: Wiltshire
- Region: South West
- Country: England
- Sovereign state: United Kingdom
- Post town: Chippenham
- Postcode district: SN15
- Dialling code: 01380
- Police: Wiltshire
- Fire: Dorset and Wiltshire
- Ambulance: South Western
- UK Parliament: Melksham and Devizes

Sandy Lane is a small village in Derry Hill & Studley parish in Wiltshire, England, about 4.5 miles (7 km) south-east of Chippenham and 3 miles (5 km) south-west of Calne. The village lies on the A342 Chippenham-Devizes road, just north of its junction with the A3102 to Calne.

== Description ==
At the 2011 census, its main postcode had a population of 32 people in 17 households. Sandy Lane is on the southwestern edge of the parkland around Bowood House, a country mansion which is operated as a hotel and golf resort. Nearby villages are Derry Hill (north) and Bromham (south).

The village lies to the north of the Roman road from Bath to London. The small Roman town of Verlucio was to the south-east, and the site of a Roman villa was discovered at Nuthills Farm in 1924. For some time the village was on a route from London (via Beckhampton) to Bath (via Lacock). The name 'Sandy Lane' is first recorded in 1675; in the next century there were around 20 houses and cottages.

The village is largely in the civil parish of Derry Hill & Studley; the boundary with Bromham parish runs immediately to its west. The parish was renamed from Calne Without, and reduced in size, with effect from May 2025. Wiltshire Council is the unitary authority which is responsible for all significant local government functions. In 1975 the whole village was made a Conservation Area, which was slightly enlarged in 1994.

== Notable buildings ==
Sandy Lane has several well-preserved thatched cottages. The church of St Mary & St Nicholas is also thatched. Julian Orbach, updating Pevsner's work, describes Sandy Lane as "a most picturesque Bowood estate village, of thatched cottages in the distinctive local ironstone".

Wans House, in its own grounds in the angle between Back Lane and the Devizes road, is an 1820 remodelling of an earlier house. It has a two-storey 19th-century verandah with iron balconies.

The public house, the George Inn, is a two-storey 18th-century building re-fronted in the 19th century. For a time in the 18th century there were two other roadside inns, the White Hart and the Black Horse.

== Church and chapel ==
Sandy Lane was anciently within the large parish of St Mary, Calne. When a chapelry district was created in 1841 for the newly built Christ Church at Derry Hill, Sandy Lane was included there. Then in 1864, the area of Chittoe parish (where St Mary's church had been built in 1845) was enlarged to include Sandy Lane.

A small wooden chapel of ease dedicated to St Nicholas was erected at Back Lane in 1892. Described by Pevsner as "endearing", it is a standard design from a Worcester company.

When Chittoe church was declared redundant in 1980, its parish and benefice were combined with Bromham, and in the next year Sandy Lane church was rededicated to St Mary and St Nicholas. Today Bromham parish is part of the Bromham, Chittoe and Sandy Lane benefice, which also covers St Matthew's Church at Rowde.

Baptists built Providence Chapel on the village street in 1817, in ironstone with ashlar dressings. Orbach describes its arched mullion-and-transom windows as "oddly Elizabethan". Regular services continued until c.1956 but by 1986 the building had become a private house.

== Gallery ==
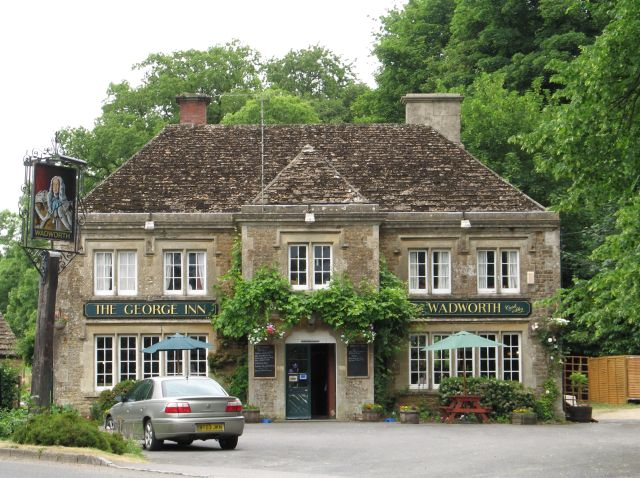
The George Inn

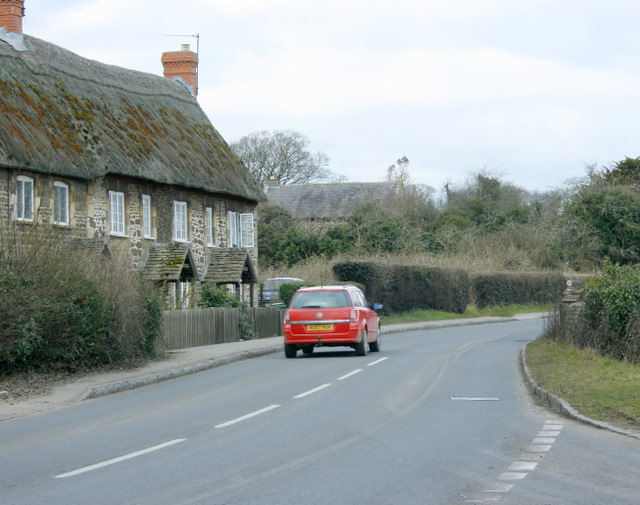
Looking north on the A342

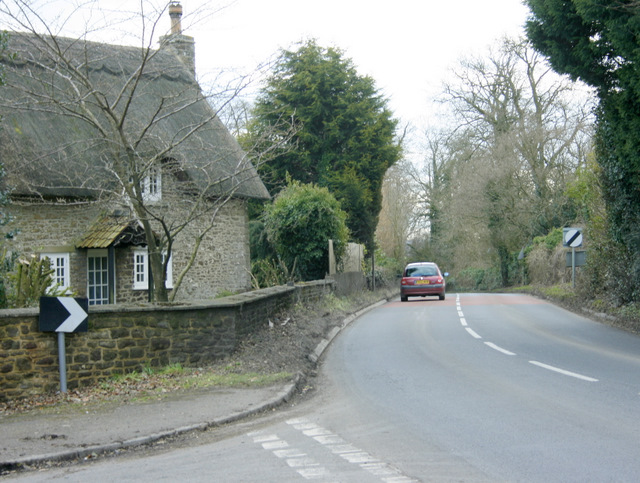
Looking south on the A342
