= Cocklemore Brook =

River in Wiltshire, England

Cocklemore Brook Pewe Brook

Location
- Country: England
- Region: West of England
- District: Wiltshire

Physical characteristics
- Source: Pitter's Farm
  - location: Studley, Wiltshire, England
  - coordinates: 51.4171°N 2.0684°W
  - elevation: 492 ft (150 m)
- Mouth: Bristol Avon
  - location: Lackham, Wiltshire, England
  - coordinates: 51.4323°N 2.1019°W
  - elevation: 197 ft (60 m)
- Length: 2.5 mi (4.0 km), westerly

Basin features
- River system: Bristol Avon

The Cocklemore Brook is a short tributary of the Bristol Avon, some 2.5 miles (4.0 km) long. It rises near Studley in Wiltshire, England, and flows in a north and then westerly direction, draining the Pewsham area before passing underneath the Wilts & Berks Canal and then joining the Avon near Lackham House, now home to Lackham College. An alternate name of Pewe Brook is recorded in the 14th century.
