= A345 road =

Road in England

A345

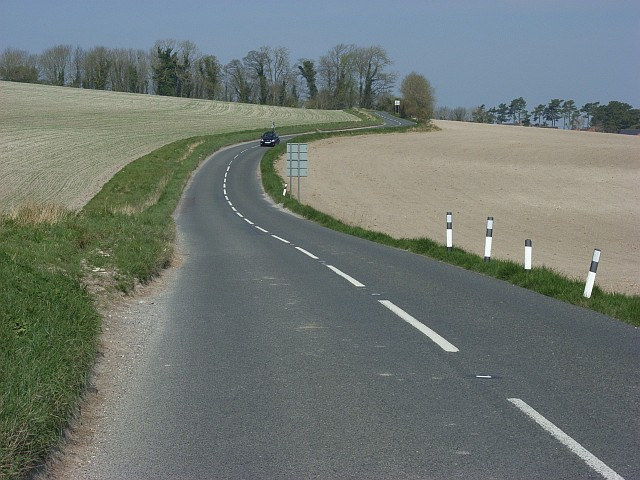
- Near Upavon, crossing chalky farmland

Route information
- Length: 27 mi (43 km)

Major junctions
- south end: Salisbury; 51.0763°N 1.7971°W
- A36 A303 A3028 A342; A4
- north end: Marlborough; 51.4173°N 1.7346°W

Location
- Country: United Kingdom
- Constituent country: England
- Primary destinations: Salisbury

Road network
- Roads in the United Kingdom; Motorways; A and B road zones

The A345 is a secondary A road in Wiltshire, England running from Salisbury to Marlborough and the A4. The road is a main south–north link across Salisbury Plain, which is renowned for its rich archaeology, and passes many ancient points of interest along its way.

== Route ==
The road begins in Salisbury at the Castle roundabout and travels north out of the city, passing close to Old Sarum Castle, taking a predominantly straight line to Boscombe Down and then Amesbury before meeting the A303 at Countess roundabout, where it shares Countess Services with the major road. At this point it passes within 2 miles (3.2 km) of the World Heritage Site at Stonehenge. Continuing north, the road passes near to Woodhenge and the Ministry of Defence Royal School of Artillery base at Larkhill. This part of the route can be hazardous as there are often tanks crossing and the road is susceptible to subsidence. The next significant places are Netheravon, and then Upavon where the road briefly separates into a one-way system around the village, running concurrently with the A342 to Devizes. From here the A345 goes to Pewsey, where the Pewsey White Horse is best viewed, and then continues on to Marlborough, ending at a roundabout leading to the High Street which is the A4 road.

== History ==
Originally, the A345 continued north from Marlborough to a junction with the A419 at Commonhead, southeast of Swindon, and then through Swindon to meet the A419 again at Blunsdon. When the M4 motorway was opened, the section from Marlborough to junction 15 of the motorway became a northern extension of the A346. From the motorway to Commonhead, the road became part of the A419, and the route through Swindon was renumbered A4259 and A4311.

Between Amesbury and Durrington, a 0.8 miles (1.3 km) section of the A345 was realigned further east away from the Woodhenge scheduled monument in 1968, crossing to a further west alignment and incorporating a new roundabout at its junction with the A3028.

The southern terminus was originally further south along Castle Street at Salisbury market square, but with the opening of the Salisbury Inner Ring Road in 1969 the southern section was declassified.
