= Foxham, Wiltshire =

Village in Wiltshire, England

Coordinates: 51.493°N 02.043°W

Foxham
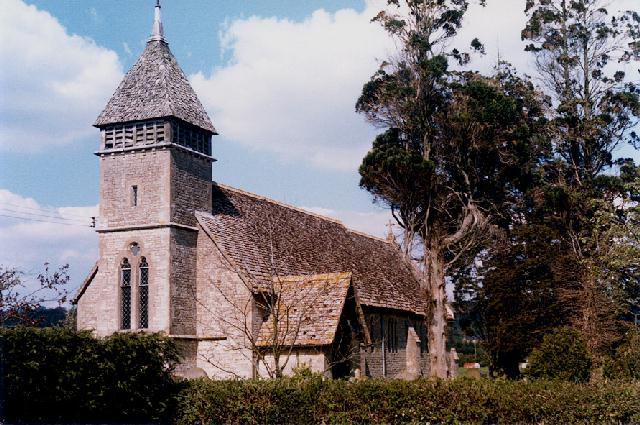
- Church of St John the Baptist, Foxham

- Location within Wiltshire
- OS grid reference: ST971771
- Civil parish: Bremhill
- Unitary authority: Wiltshire
- Ceremonial county: Wiltshire
- Region: South West
- Country: England
- Sovereign state: United Kingdom
- Post town: Chippenham
- Postcode district: SN15
- Dialling code: 01249
- Police: Wiltshire
- Fire: Dorset and Wiltshire
- Ambulance: South Western
- UK Parliament: Chippenham
- Website: Bremhill Parish Council

Foxham is a village in Bremhill civil parish in Wiltshire, England, about 5 miles (8.0 km) northeast of Chippenham and a similar distance northwest of Calne.

== Manor ==
The Domesday Book of 1086 recorded a small settlement of ten households at Cadenham, close to the east end of present-day Foxham.

The manor house, Cadenham Manor, is a house of five bays built in the second half of the 17th century. It replaces an earlier house, from which part of a window-head survives in the north porch that was added in the 20th century. The manor was owned by a branch of the Hungerford family, including George Hungerford (1637-1712).

== Church and chapel ==
There is a record of Foxham being a chapelry of the parish of Bremhill and Highway by 1219. The present Church of England parish church of Saint John the Baptist was designed by the Gothic Revival architect William Butterfield and built in 1878–81. The church is Grade II* listed, and has a stained glass window made in about 1855 that was part of the east window of St Martin's parish church, Bremhill. Today Bremhill parish is part of the Marden Vale benefice, alongside St Mary and Holy Trinity at Calne, and the churches of Blackland and Derry Hill.

A Wesleyan chapel was built at Foxham in 1855, but it has been closed and converted into a house.

== Canal ==
Construction of the Wilts & Berks Canal began at Semington in 1796 and had reached Foxham by December 1798, when Foxham locks were under construction. By June 1800 the next section, from Foxham to Dauntsey, was complete, and the canal was completed to Abingdon in September 1810.

The canal passed Foxham just east of Cadenham Manor, with two locks just north of the Foxham-Hilmarton road. It brought coal from the Somerset coalfield to Swindon and Abingdon. Traffic declined after the Great Western railway was completed in 1841 and was minimal by the end of the century, then ceased altogether in 1901 after the partial collapse of the aqueduct over the River Marden at Stanley, some 3.5 miles (5.6 km) south of Foxham. The canal was formally abandoned by an Act of Parliament in 1914.

The main line of the canal is now being restored. As of 2010, restoration of the section east of Foxham Top Lock was complete.

== Amenities ==
Foxham has one public house, the Foxham Inn.

The Reading Room was built in 1884 by the Lansdowne family and extended in 1979. It is Foxham's village hall and also houses its Sub-Post Office.

== Sources ==
- Pevsner, Nikolaus; Cherry, Bridget (revision) (1975) [1963]. The Buildings of England: Wiltshire. Harmondsworth: Penguin Books. p. 251. ISBN 0140710264.
- Small, Doug (1999). The Wilts & Berks Canal. Stroud: Tempus Publishing Ltd. ISBN 978-0-7524-1619-9.
