= Ernest Pullein =

English organist and composer

Ernest Pullein FRCO (22 February 1880 – 28 January 1958) was an organist and composer based in England.

== Life ==
He was born in 1878, the son of William Pullein and Hannah Rose. His father was a professor of music.

His three brothers, William Rose Pullein, Frank Pullein and John Pullein were also organists.

He was in the choir of Lincoln Cathedral as a boy.

He served in the Royal Naval Air Service in the First World War. His service number was F41719.

In 1922 he was charged with indecent assault on a youth of 16.

== Cricket ==
He played Cricket for Lincolnshire County Cricket Club from 1908 to 1914. He wrote a booklet, Former Players of Lincoln City published by the Lincolnshire Chronicle in 1915.

== Appointments ==
- Organist of St. Andrew's Church, Lincoln 1898 – 1908
- Organist of St. Martin's Church, Lincoln 1908 – ????

== Compositions ==
He composed organ and church music.
