= St Andrew's Church, Lincoln =

Coordinates: 53°13′30.45″N 0°32′16.24″W

- St Andrew's Church, Lincoln
- OS grid reference: SK 97602 70815
- Location: Lincoln
- Country: England
- Denomination: Church of England

Architecture
- Architect: James Fowler
- Groundbreaking: 1876
- Completed: 1877
- Construction cost: £6,000
- Closed: 1968
- Demolished: 1968

St Andrew's Church, Lincoln was a parish church on Canwick Road in Lincoln in the Church of England between 1877 and 1968.

== History ==
The church was a built of a chapel of ease in the parish of St Peter at Gowts between 1876 and 1877.

The building was constructed in the Early English style to designs by the architect James Fowler. It seated around 600 people. The consecration service took place on Tuesday 21 May 1878 attended by the Bishop of Lincoln, Christopher Wordsworth.

The chancel was decorated by George Frederick Bodley.

It was established as a parish in its own right on 21 December 1883.

The church was closed and demolished in 1968, and the parish reunited with St Peter at Gowts in 1980.

== Organ ==
The organ was installed in 1881 by the builders Wordsworth and Maskell. The specification of the organ and the design for the case were kindly furnished by Canon Frederick Heathcote Sutton, Rector of St. Helen's Church, Brant Broughton. A specification of the organ can be found on the National Pipe Organ Register.

=== Organists ===
- William Rose Pullein
- Ernest Pullein 1898 - 1908
