= St Mary's Church, Calne =

St Mary's, Calne
- Church of St Mary the Virgin
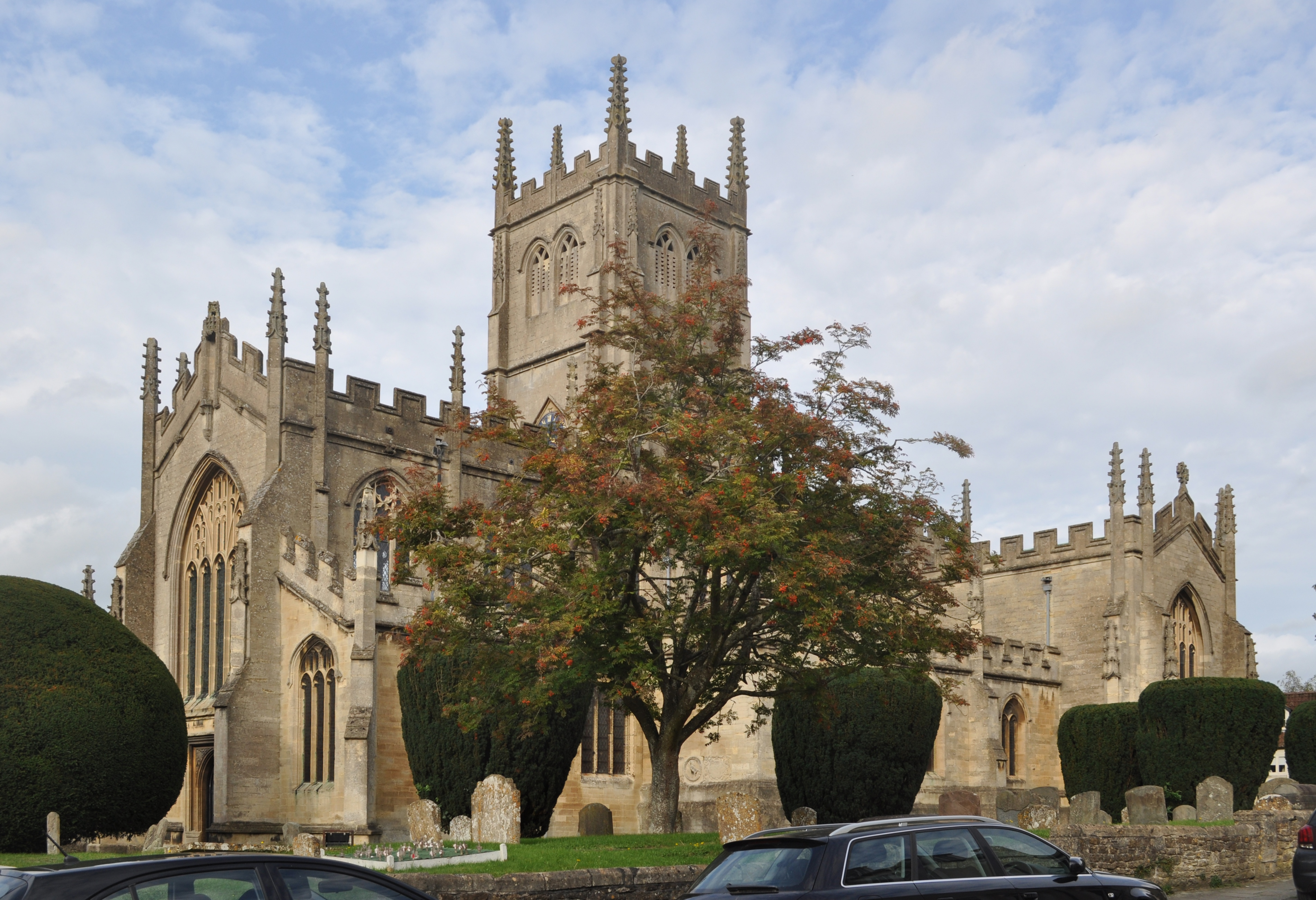

- Location in Wiltshire
- 51.4371°N 2.0028°W
- OS grid reference: ST 99899 70905
- Location: Calne, Wiltshire
- Country: England
- Denomination: Anglican
- Website: parishofcalneandblackland.org.uk/st-marys/

History
- Status: Parish church

Architecture
- Functional status: Active
- Style: Perpendicular, Gothic survival
- Years built: 12th century, restored 1864

Administration
- Province: Canterbury
- Diocese: Salisbury
- Archdeaconry: Wilts
- Deanery: Calne
- Parish: Calne and Blackland

Listed Building – Grade I
- Reference no.: 1271365

St Mary's Church is the main Anglican church in the town of Calne, Wiltshire, England. The church is large and cruciform, with a tall north tower; it stands in a triangular churchyard at the heart of the town. Begun in the 12th century, it is described by Pevsner as "the proud church of a prosperous clothiers' town". The church is a Grade I listed building.

== History and architecture ==
A church was recorded at Calne in 1066 and was almost certainly on the site of the present church. By 1116 the church's estate endowed a prebend at Salisbury Cathedral. The present building dates from c. 1160–70, and Norman work survives in the nave and part of a doorway, later moved to the north porch door.

The church was lengthened in the 14th century and St Edmund's chapel was added on the north side. The 15th century saw the addition of a clerestory and north and south porches, together with the re-roofing of the nave.

In 1638 the crossing tower and spire collapsed, damaging the north and east of the chancel. The tower was rebuilt over the north transept and is a notable example of the Gothic survival style, with four stages; Pevsner states that its buttress shafts and pinnacles are "in the Somerset fashion".

The church was restored to designs of William Slater in 1864, when the south and west parts were rebuilt, including the south chapel, and the pulpit and organ were moved. In 1882–3, under the direction of J.L. Pearson, the organ was again moved and the north-east chapel became a vestry; Pearson also designed restoration of the chancel in 1890–91.

== Interior ==
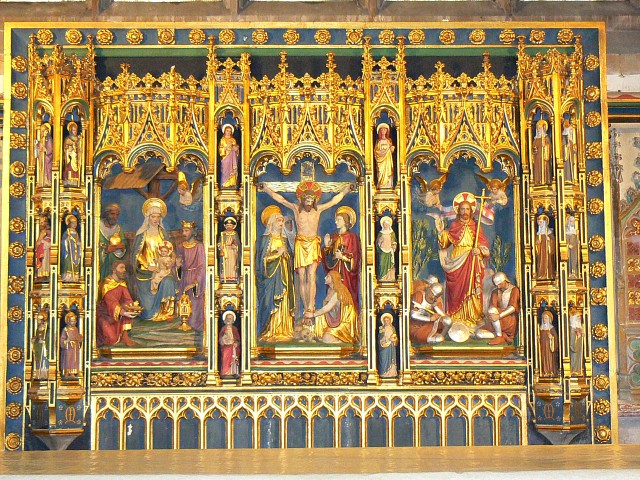
Reredos, Pearson, 1890

The 15th-century roof can be seen in the nave, and the 17th-century roof in the chancel. Bench pews are from the mid-19th century. The three-panel reredos of 1890 was designed by J.L. Pearson.

A new organ by Conacher and Co was installed in 1908. The large organ case, and the altar in the south chapel, are in Arts and Crafts style from the first decade of the 20th century. They were designed by C.R. Ashbee and carved by Alec Miller, from Ashbee's Guild at Chipping Campden.

== Parish ==
The ancient parish of Calne covered a wide area, including Berwick Bassett, Cherhill and Studley, each with churches or chapels dependent on St Mary's. In the 19th century Berwick Bassett and Cherhill became independent, and much of the west of the parish was transferred to the new church at Derry Hill, including Sandy Lane, Studley and Bowood; also Stockley was transferred to Heddington.

Today St Mary's is the head church of the parish of Calne and Blackland, which comprises Holy Trinity at Quemerford, a Victorian church, and (since 1881) the small 13th-century church at Blackland, south-east of the town. Since 2010 the parish, together with Derry Hill, Bremhill and Foxham, has been served by the Marden Vale Team Ministry.

Registers dating from 1528 are held in the Wiltshire and Swindon Record Office.

== Sources ==
- Crowley, D. A. (ed.). "Victoria County History - Wiltshire - Vol 17 pp101-109 - Calne: Churches". British History Online. University of London.
