= A4 road (England) =

Major road in England

A4
- Bath Road
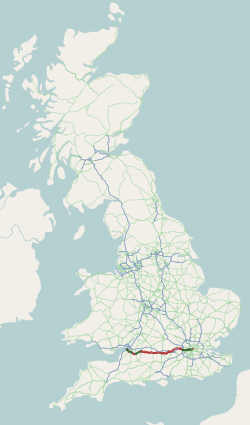

Route information
- Length: 126.64 mi (203.81 km)

Major junctions
- East end: A40 in the City of London
- A30; M4; A33; A34; A46; A36; A39; A37; M5
- West end: A403 in Avonmouth

Location
- Country: United Kingdom
- Constituent country: England
- Primary destinations: Westminster, Hammersmith, Hounslow, Heathrow Airport, Slough, Maidenhead, Reading, Newbury, Marlborough, Calne, Chippenham, Bath, Bristol

Road network
- Roads in the United Kingdom; Motorways; A and B road zones
← A3	→ A5

The A4 is a major road in England from Central London to Avonmouth via Heathrow Airport, Reading, Bath and Bristol. It is historically known as the Bath Road with newer sections including the Great West Road and Portway. The road was once the main route from London to Bath, Bristol and the west of England and formed, after the A40, the second main western artery from London.

Although most traffic is carried by the M4 motorway today, the A4 still acts as the main route from Bristol to London for non-motorway traffic.

== History ==
=== Turnpikes ===
The A4 has gone through many transformations through the ages from pre-Roman routes, Roman roads (such as the one passing Silbury Hill), and basic wagon tracks. During the Middle Ages, most byways and tracks served to connect villages with their nearest market town. A survey of Savernake Forest near Hungerford in 1228 mentions "The King's Street" running between the town and Marlborough. This street corresponded roughly with the route of the modern A4. In 1632, Thomas Witherings was appointed Postmaster of Foreign Mails by Charles I. Three years later, the king charged him with building six "Great Roads" to aid in the delivery of the post, of which the Great West Road was one.

It was not until the 17th century that a distinct route between London and Bristol started to resemble today's road. During the 17th century, the A4 was known as the Great Road to Bristol. When Queen Anne started patronising the spa city of Bath, the road became more commonly known as Bath Road. Over the years, the direction of the road has taken many detours depending on such factors as changes in tolls or turnpike patronage. For example, in 1750 the toll road from London was altered to go through Melksham; and in 1695 the map maker, John Ogilby, produced a map of the Hungerford area of the Great West Road showing two possible routes.

As Bath became more popular with the wealthy and famous, it was inevitable that turnpike trusts would be set up under the terms of the Turnpike Acts to pay for maintenance and improvements to the road. The first turnpike on this road was between Reading and Theale in 1714. Due to increasing traffic, sections of the road between Kensington, over Hounslow Hill, to Twyford were turnpike by 1717 with the remaining sections placed under turnpike trusts.

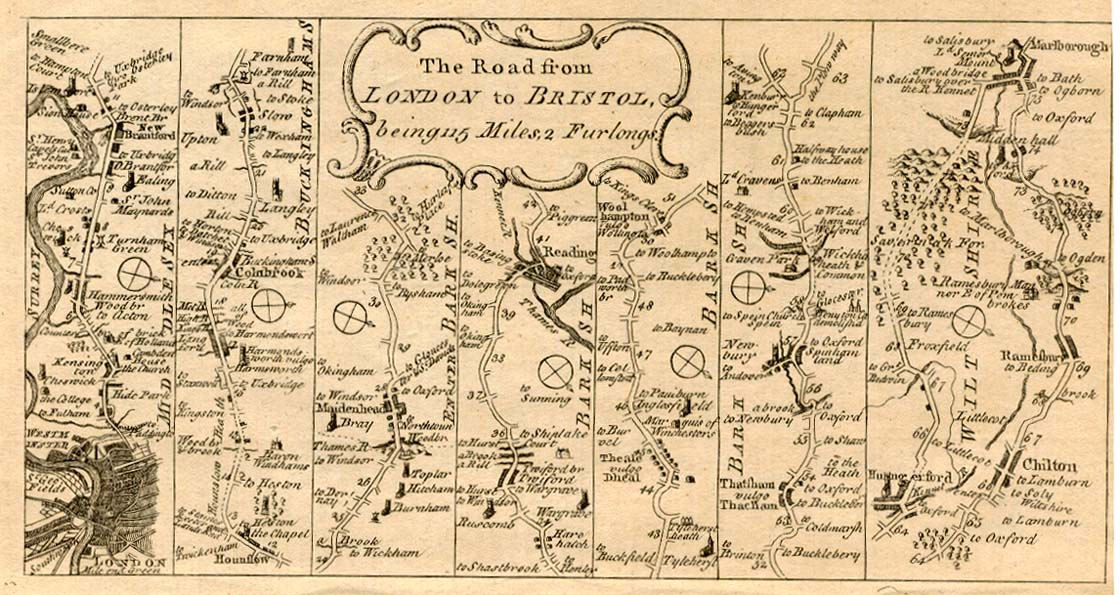
Strip Map of Bath Road 1786.

As turnpike trusts were individually run, there was the possibility for greatly differing road conditions, especially over the London Clay basin of Kensington, Brentford, Hounslow and Slough, where winter conditions left the way muddy and uneven. This was not always the case with the Bath Road, as many of the wealthy landowners along the route co-operated informally and exercised a large amount of control over feeder roads. As a result, control of the Bath Road was easy to maintain and many inns and towns became prosperous.

Tollhouses were established at Colnbrook, Maidenhead, Twyford, Castle Street Reading, Thatcham and Benham. During the 1820s, the employment of good surveyors improved the condition of the road and aided an increased flow of wealthy travellers. The tolls raised from such clientele ensured that when the turnpike trusts handed over the route to local highway boards, they had no financial liabilities. Justices of the peace were empowered by the Highway Act 1862 to combine turnpike trusts into highways districts. This meant that by the late 1860s trusts were either not renewing their powers or were being terminated by general Acts of Parliament. For example, most turnpikes in Berkshire, including the Bath Road, were officially wound up by 1878 when legislation transferred responsibility for dis-enturnpiked roads to the new county councils. The tollgate on the Bath Road west of Reading was removed in 1864 as the outward pressure of urban development made rates a more acceptable way of financing the maintenance of what was now a suburban road.

=== Postal service and coaching ===
With the improvement being made to the road systems, the business of moving mail became easier and thus more profitable as volumes were able to increase. In Bristol, a postal office had been well established by the 1670s. The journey time to London at this period was about 16 and three quarter hours. A letter from Bath in 1684 took about 3 days going via a postal office in Marshfield on the Bristol Road. (The route to Bristol did not yet go through Bath at this time.) Journey times during the Turnpike era fell with the improvements from 2 days in 1752 to 38 hours in 1782 and 18 hours by 1836. Royal Mail coaches in 1836 were able to do the trip in 12 to 13 hours.

Further improvements to regional post services were made between 1719 and 1763 due to contracts with the London Inland Letter Office negotiated by Ralph Allen, the postmaster of Bath.

In the early part of the 19th century, coaching was at its height with six stagecoaches each day carrying passengers to and from London along the Bath Road in 1830, rising to ten by 1836. Hungerford is at about the midway point of the journey between London and Bristol and was ideally positioned to take advantage of the increase in coaching. In 1836, five companies operated a coaching service through Hungerford. This peak was to be short-lived following the construction of the Great Western Railway. The decline in coaching traffic in Hungerford coincided with the building of the Great Western Railway from London to Bath and Bristol, and the subsequent Berks and Hants Railway line from Newbury to Hungerford itself in 1847. By 1843, it was reported that the stage coaches had ceased running between Bristol and London.

== Route ==
=== Holborn Circus to Westminster (0.4 miles) ===
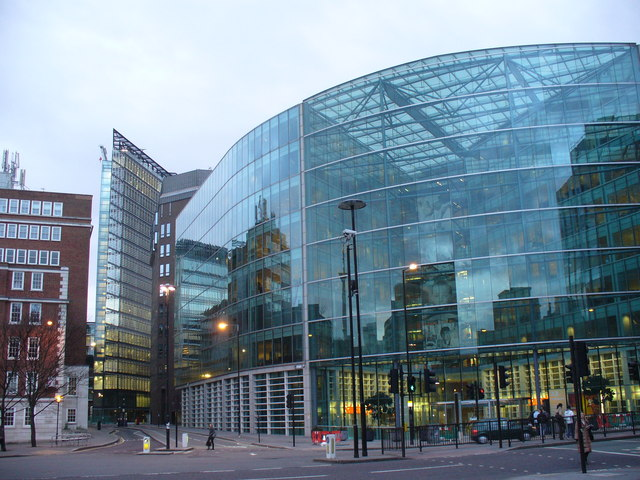
View down New Fetter Lane from Holborn Circus, with Sainsbury's head office on the right

The A4 begins as New Fetter Lane on the very edge of the City of London at Holborn Circus on the A40. It goes in a southerly direction to join Fleet Street. The eastern half of Fleet Street (the section not on the A4) and the area between Fleet Street and the Thames was where many British national newspapers at one time had their head offices.

=== Westminster to Hammersmith via Kensington (4.6 miles) ===
The road heads west through the City of Westminster via Aldwych and the Strand, passing notable landmarks such as the Royal Courts of Justice, the Savoy and Adelphi theatres, and Charing Cross railway station.

From Charing Cross station to Green Park, the westbound and eastbound routes of the A4 are considerably different, due to one-way systems. Westbound, the A4 continues along the Strand up to Charing Cross itself, then along Cockspur Street and into Pall Mall, the location of many exclusive gentlemen's clubs as well as the Institute of Directors, before turning right along St James's Street to reach Piccadilly.

Eastbound from Green Park, the A4 runs along the full length of Piccadilly to Piccadilly Circus, before turning right along Haymarket. It bears left along Pall Mall East, then right along the west side of Trafalgar Square, past the National Gallery and Canada House, to Charing Cross. Finally, it bears left along the east side of the Square, past South Africa House, then right along Duncannon Street to reach Charing Cross station.

The first part of Regent Street, now known as Regent Street St James's, which runs from Waterloo Place to Piccadilly Circus is also signed as the A4; all traffic here runs in a northbound direction.

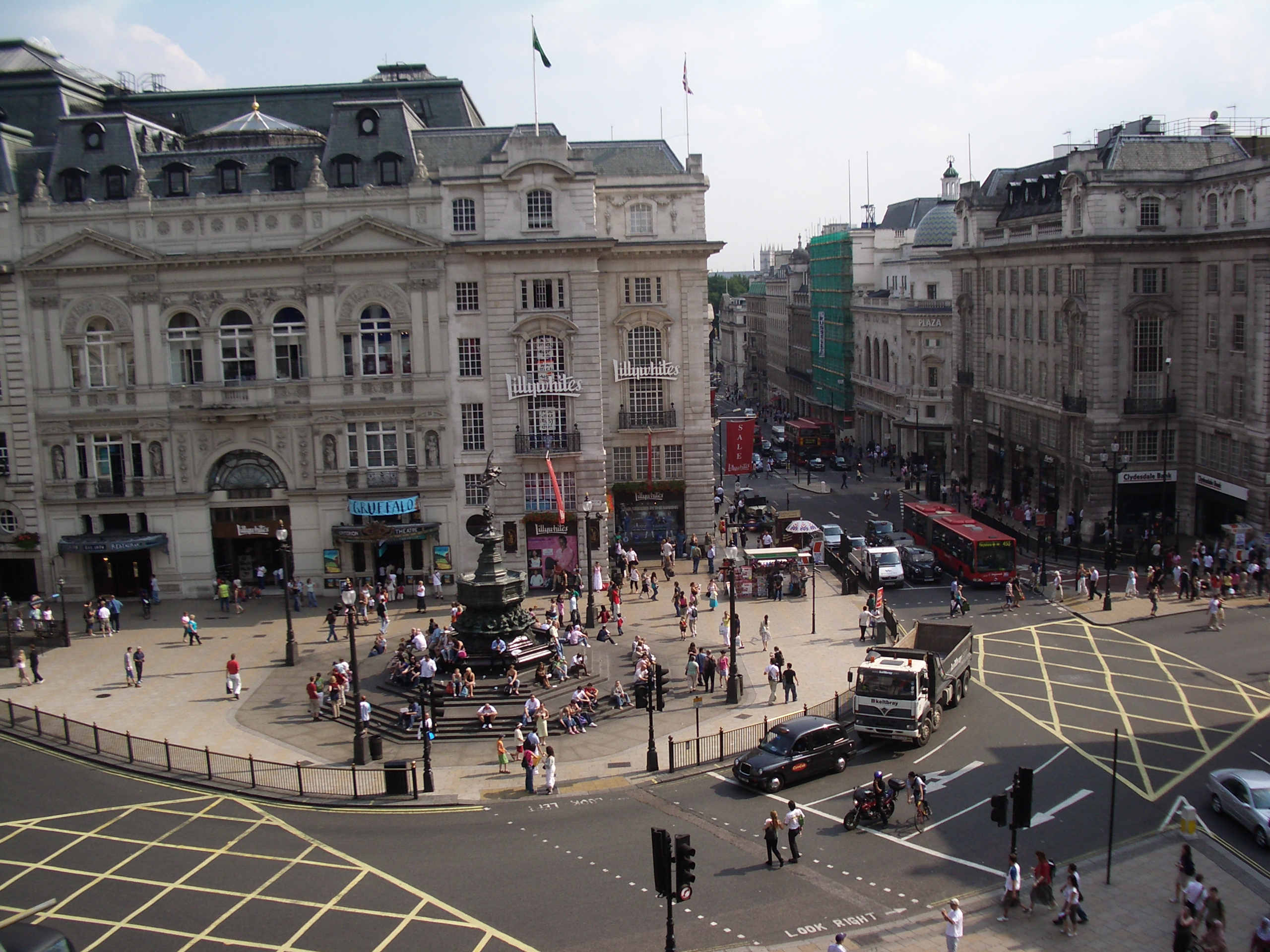
Piccadilly Circus

From Green Park, the A4 enters a short tunnel under Hyde Park Corner, where Wellington Arch stands. Afterwards, the road continues along the first part of Knightsbridge, before bearing left onto Brompton Road. This is an affluent area of London, containing the Harrods and Harvey Nichols department stores as well as numerous embassies. At this point, the road fully enters the Royal Borough of Kensington and Chelsea.

At the Brompton Oratory, the road bears right along Thurloe Place and Cromwell Gardens, past the Victoria and Albert Museum and the Ismaili Centre, and onto Cromwell Road, past the Natural History Museum. At Earl's Court, the A4 becomes dual carriageway, and continues along West Cromwell Road, over the West London line into West Kensington and the Borough of Hammersmith and Fulham.

A 5-mile (8.0 km) section of the road from Knightsbridge to the Chiswick flyover was the first section of clearway designated in London. It introduced no stopping on the road during rush hours on 21 August 1961.

=== Hammersmith to Heathrow Airport (10.7 miles) ===
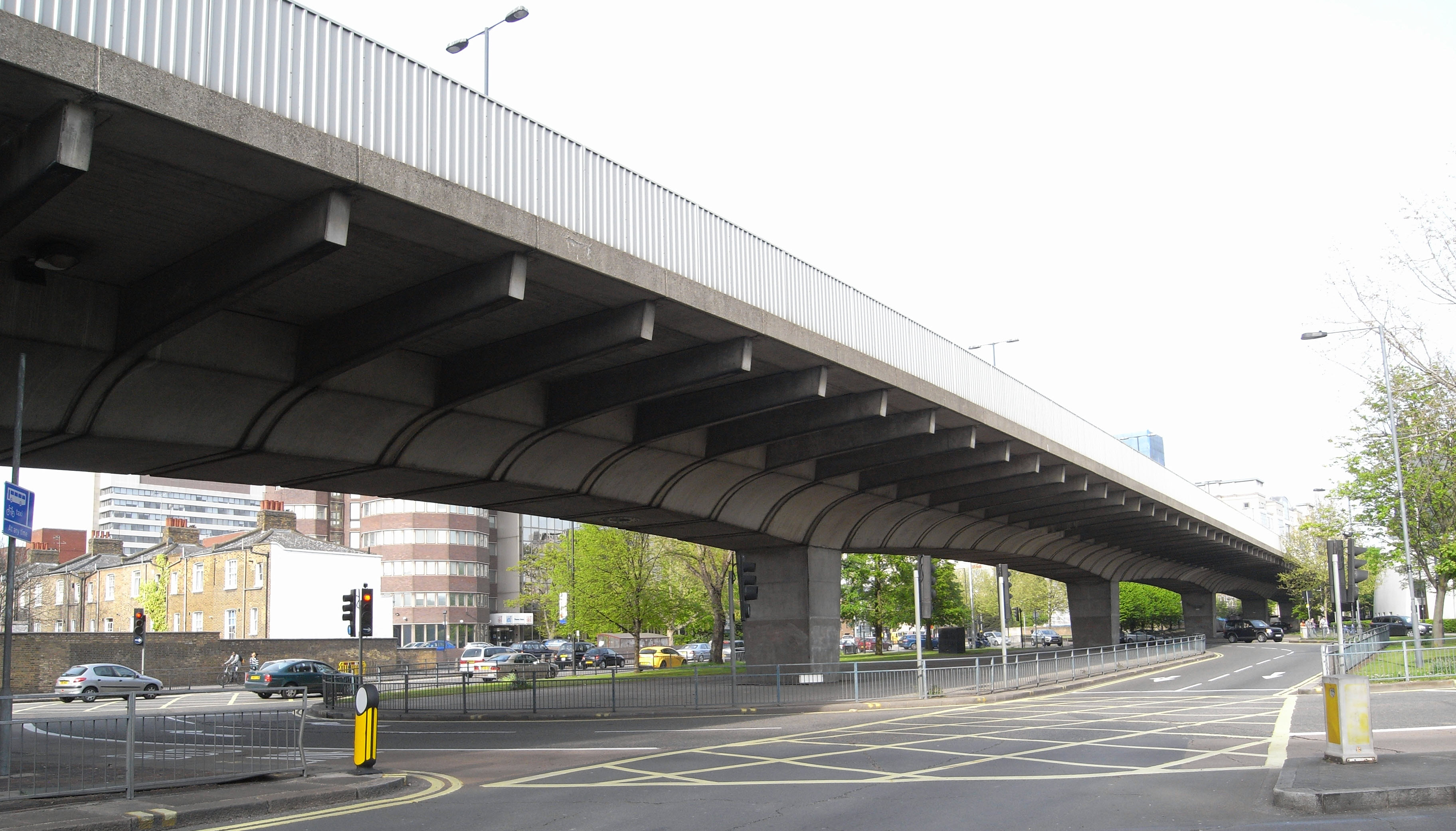
The Hammersmith flyover

The A4 continues along Talgarth Road past the London Academy of Music and Dramatic Art. The road becomes elevated at the Hammersmith flyover and heads towards Heathrow Airport as the Great West Road, passing Hammersmith's two churches of St Paul and St Peter. At this point the road is close to the River Thames.

The road enters Chiswick and the Borough of Hounslow, passing Fuller's Brewery. After Hogarth Roundabout, the road passes Hogarth's House and is called Hogarth Lane, then Ellesmere Road and Cedars Road. It becomes the Great West Road again just a few yards short of the start of the Chiswick flyover, which is junction 1 of the M4 motorway. Gunnersbury's Russian Orthodox Cathedral is clearly visible on the right.

The next major intersection is Chiswick Roundabout, which is the junction for both the North and South Circular Roads. The road then lies directly underneath its successor the M4 as far as the crossing with Windmill Road. The stretch between Chiswick's western border to Syon Lane (Gillette Corner) is known as the Golden Mile and has notable Art Deco factories. The road continues as the Great West Road through Osterley and Hounslow where it splits with the A30, which is known as the Great South West Road. Between the two world wars, the Great West Road was built as a bypass to relieve traffic congestion in Brentford and Hounslow.

After the A30, the A4 changes its name to Bath Road, enters Cranford, and crosses the River Crane into the Borough of Hillingdon. It then passes along the northern boundary of Heathrow Airport, before leaving the London suburbs over the M25 towards the west.

=== Heathrow Airport to Slough (6.7 miles) ===
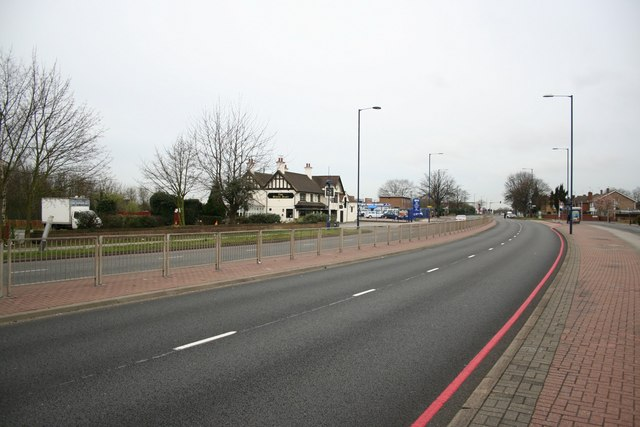
The A4 near Heathrow Airport

After leaving Heathrow Airport, still the A4, it becomes the Colnbrook Bypass and climbs over the M25 motorway. This bypass for the narrow main road of Colnbrook was built after the Second World War across farmland between Harmondsworth and the outskirts of Langley.

The next major intersection is junction 5 of the M4 (Slough East), known as the Langley junction. At this point the A4 loses its trunk road classification.

Continuing towards Slough town centre, the road, now named London Road, passes Kedermister Park on the right. Changing into Sussex Place, the architecturally impressive St Bernard's former convent is on the right. Becoming the dual carriageway Wellington Street (a late 1960s bypass for the High Street), Tesco's massive "aircraft hangar" supermarket is on the right and the Queensmere and Observatory Shopping Centres are on the left.

The end of this section of the Great Western Road is in the centre of Slough at the junction of William Street and Wellington Street. Nearby is Slough railway station, served by Great Western Railway.

=== Slough to Maidenhead (6.0 miles) ===
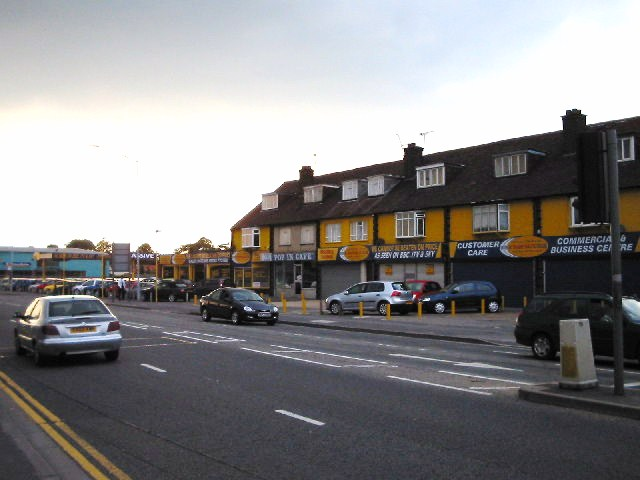
The A4 in Slough

Continuing from the William Street / Wellington Street junction, in the centre of Slough, the road heads westwards towards Maidenhead. The short stretch of dual carriageway is Wellington Street, then briefly on the most western end of the High Street, over the railway bridge for the line between Slough and Windsor Central station.

The Bath Road begins on the west side of the bridge. On the left is Slough's 1936 Town Hall, now abandoned by the local council, and on the right Salt Hill Park.

The next major road intersection is by the Three Tuns Pub where the A4 crosses the A355. This road goes north towards Farnham Royal, Farnham Common, Beaconsfield and the M40 at junction 2. To the south, it goes towards the M4 (junction 6, Slough Centre) and Windsor.

The route at this point runs parallel to both the Great Western Main Line and the M4. The road continues past the southern fringe of Slough Trading Estate.

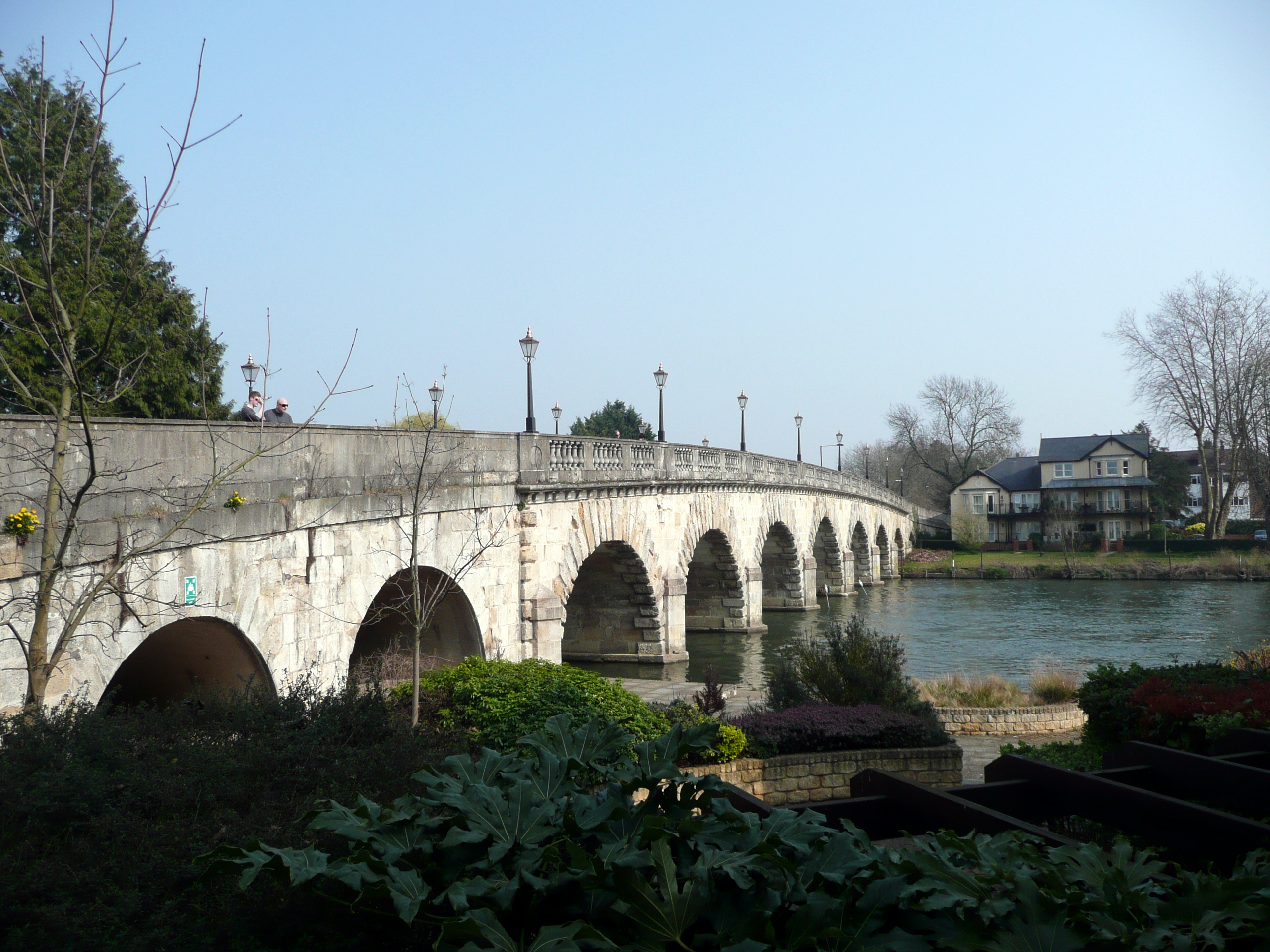
Maidenhead Bridge crossing the River Thames

On Slough's western boundary is the Huntercombe Spur roundabout, linking the A4 to junction 7 of the M4. Here the dual carriageway ends. The road bends right at Taplow and passes under a high railway bridge, then over the River Thames flood prevention channel.

The road then goes over Maidenhead's old bridge, spanning the River Thames, and into the eastern outskirts of Maidenhead along Bridge Road, St Cloud Way and Bad Godesberg Way. The centre of Maidenhead is reached at a roundabout that forms the junction with the A308. Turning northwards on the A308 would lead to the A404 towards Marlow and High Wycombe; southwards, the A308 heads towards Windsor and provides an opportunity to branch off for junction 8/9 of the M4.

=== Maidenhead to Reading (12.3 miles) ===
Heading out of Maidenhead town centre, the road follows Castle Hill and then Bath Road. At the outskirts, the road forms part of junction 9b of the A404(M)/A404, which links junction 8/9 of the M4 with junction 4 of the M40 at Handy Cross. The A4 crosses open countryside before following New Bath Road on the outskirts of Twyford. This is a bypass, built in 1929, that deviates from the old route of the A4, and crosses the River Loddon on its way into the suburbs of Reading via the village of Charvil.

The A4 passes the King George's Field in Sonning, which are used as playing fields, and the Reading Cricket and Hockey Club. As it enters Reading, along the London Road again, it crosses the junction of the A3290 next to Palmer Park, which leads to junction 10 of the M4.

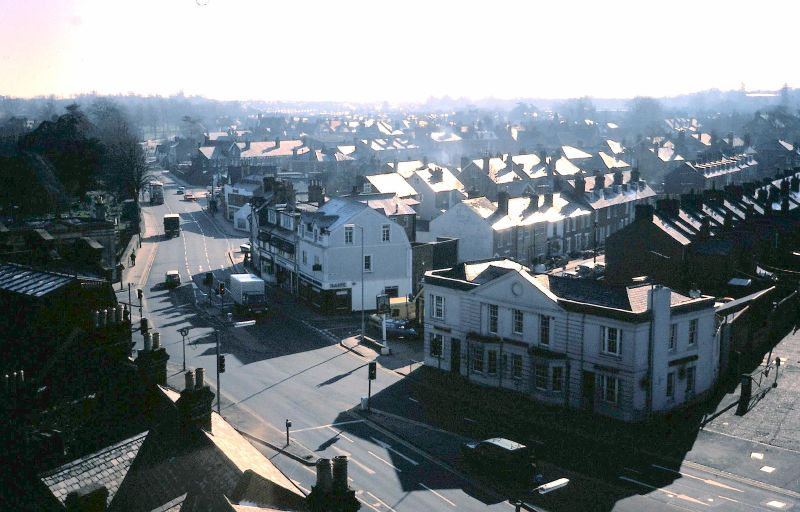
Cemetery Junction, Reading in 1976

The A4 goes over the intersection with the A329 Cemetery Junction which links Wokingham with Pangbourne, passing the Royal Berkshire Hospital and the London Road Campus of the University of Reading. At London Street and again at Southampton Street, the A4 meets the A327 twice, since the latter loops round on two branches which meet at Whitley Street. Between the two junctions, the A4 becomes Crown Street for approximately 150 metres.

=== Reading to Newbury (16.7 miles) ===
On the other side of the intersection the A4 follows Pell Street and continues westward. Here it crosses the River Kennet, the Holy Brook and the A33 relief road, which goes towards Basingstoke. In West Reading, the A4 becomes Berkeley Avenue, and then the Bath Road. It passes Prospect Park, and the suburbs of Southcote, Horncastle and Calcot, before reaching junction 12 of the M4. The A4 heads south westerly through Theale and over the roundabout connecting it to the A340 which heads towards Pangbourne.

Heading towards Thatcham, the road passes Aldermaston Wharf next to the Kennet and Avon Canal and through the villages of Woolhampton and Midgham. A large industrial estate is on the left as the road enters Thatcham. At the roundabout after the industrial Estate the route follows London Road and passes Thatcham towards Benham Hill and Newbury. At the Benham Hill roundabout it goes along Bath Road where it deviates from Turnpike Road. Bath Road is the original turnpiked road and the road now confusingly called Turnpike Road was originally called The Shaw Road. The turnpike then continues along London Road as it enters the outskirts of Newbury.

Heading towards the centre of Newbury, the route passes the West Berkshire Community Hospital on the right. To the North of the town centre the road becomes part of an unusual junction with the A339 that links the new A34 by-pass to the north with Basingstoke to the south. The junction is a combination of a figure of eight roundabout with an elevated section that used to be the old route of the A34.

=== Newbury to Marlborough (18.8 miles) ===
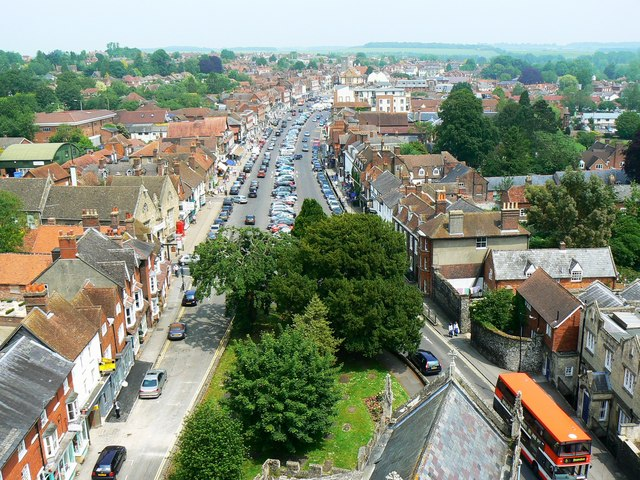
Aerial view of High Street, Marlborough

After the junction, the road heads out of town through Speenhamland along Western Avenue and Bath Road to the junction with the A34 Newbury bypass, which was opened, after some controversy, on 17 November 1998, at a cost of £104 million. The route heads over undulating countryside in a fairly straight westward direction towards Hungerford, parallel to the Kennet and Avon Canal and crossing the River Kennet on the outskirts of the town at the same time as intersecting with the A338. The route does not enter the town centre, but continues through the northern part of town on its way to Marlborough, via the village of Froxfield and the northern edge of Savernake Forest.

On entering the outskirts of Marlborough the road follows London Road. Crossing the River Kennet again it briefly shares the highway with the A346 which connects northwards to Swindon. It splits again at a roundabout along New Road and Oxford Street into the town centre on the High Street. The High Street is a traditional main thoroughfare for an English market town, in that it is wide, with space for market stalls on either side and in the middle, though these spaces are usually marked for car parking.

Until the late 1980s most of this section, and some of the following Wiltshire section, was configured as three lanes, with the central lane available for overtaking traffic in either direction. This is no longer considered safe so the road now has one wider-than-normal lane in each direction, with ghost islands at junctions to discourage overtaking at these points.

=== Marlborough to Chippenham (18.9 miles) ===
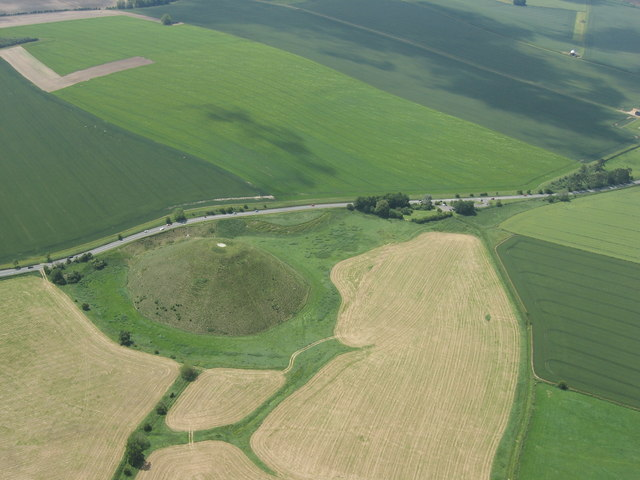
Aerial view of Silbury Hill

The A4 continues along the High Street on its way out of Marlborough via Bridewell Street and Bath Road. The road passes underneath a covered bridge that links Morris House of Marlborough College to the North Block of the same establishment. The college is an independent boarding school established in 1843 using some of the buildings that remained after the demise of the coaching trade, which saw the original Castle Inn Coaching House close.

The route continues westward through the village of Fyfield, across Overton Hill where there is a parking area at the start of the Ridgeway National Trail and through the village of West Kennett. On leaving West Kennett there are some lay-bys where visitors can walk a short distance from the road to the Neolithic West Kennet Long Barrow, which forms part of the Avebury World Heritage Site. One mile further along the A4 is Silbury Hill, which is also part of the Avebury World Heritage Site. A purpose built car park is located beyond the hill on the right travelling westward. As the route approaches the Beckhampton roundabout, which forms the intersection with the A361, it passes by the Waggon & Horses Inn, built in 1669 to profit from the increasing trade along the old Bath Road. It is mentioned in The Pickwick Papers by Charles Dickens.

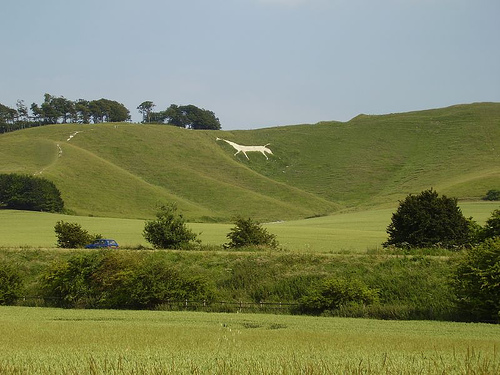
Cherhill White Horse as seen from the A4

The route continues past Cherhill. The Cherhill White Horse can be seen to the left, and nearby the Lansdowne Monument. The route then descends the Labour in Vain Hill through the village of Quemerford and into the market town of Calne. Heading towards the town centre, the road crosses a double mini roundabout, one exit forming the junction with the A3102 to Melksham. It follows New Road and passes by the old coaching inn of the Lansdowne Strand. On the way out of Calne, the road goes along Curzon Street, and then to Chilvester Hill at the roundabout where the northern part of the A3102 splits off towards Lyneham.

The A4 descends steeply before climbing again up Black Dog Hill past the Bowood House Estate. The old road used to pass through Derry Hill, but the New Road, as it is called at this point, indicates that the village was bypassed. There follows a steep descent to the junction with the A342 Devizes road and a right turn past the Lysley Arms towards Chippenham.

On the outskirts of Chippenham is a large roundabout, where the A4 used to carry straight on down London Road and The Causeway into the town centre, which has since been pedestrianised. Most traffic turns left to go round the Pewsham Estate relief road called Pewsham Way, which is now the classified A4 route. After four roundabouts, the A4 turns left in a southerly direction at another roundabout. The route heads downhill over the River Avon on the Avenue La Fleche, named after one of Chippenham's twin towns, to the Bridge Centre roundabout.

=== Chippenham to Bath (12.7 miles) ===
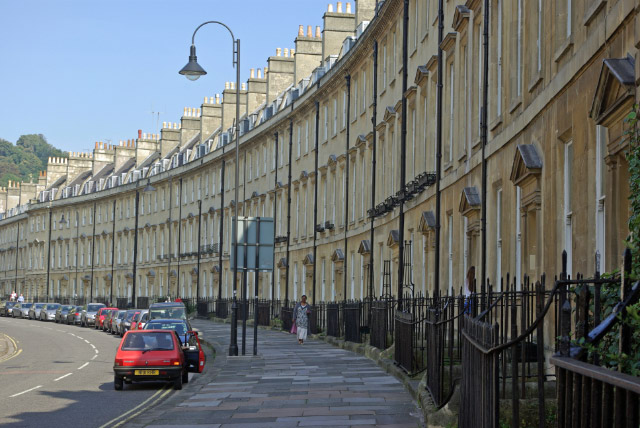
The Paragon, Bath

The Bridge Centre roundabout forms a junction of the A4 with the A420 Bristol Road. The route heads over Rowden Hill past the Chippenham Community Hospital and down to the spot where musician Eddie Cochran was killed in a car crash on 17 April 1960. A plaque has been placed there in remembrance.

From there it passes under the railway arch built by Isambard Kingdom Brunel in the 1830s and on to its junction with the A350. From this point onwards it regains its trunk road status and heads up Chequers Hill towards Corsham. The road passes through Pickwick, which used to be a village in its own right. Charles Dickens stayed at the Hare & Hounds Inn and used the village name for the title of his novel The Pickwick Papers.

After a series of roundabouts the A4 continues uphill, past what used to be the Ministry of Defence Naval Operations site at Copenacre (now a housing development) before descending steeply to the village of Box. From the road the Box Tunnel, built as part of the Great Western Railway, can be seen clearly. The road bears to the right at the junction with the A365 to Melksham, and criss-crosses with the main railway line as far as the roundabout at Bathford which forms a junction with the A363 towards Bradford-on-Avon. The road after this roundabout becomes a dual carriageway until the A4 diverts to the left down a slip road, and the remainder becomes the A46; this section, the 3-mile (4.8 km) £45 million dual-carriageway Batheaston/Swainswick Bypass, opened in summer 1996, was highly controversial both at planning and at construction stages.

The route enters the outskirts of Bath passing by the training grounds of Bath RFC. After a series of traffic light controlled junctions, the A4 continues straight ahead where it meets the A36. It passes Hedgemead Park and down The Paragon before crossing into George Street and to Queen Square.

=== Bath to Bristol/Avonmouth (19.6 miles) ===
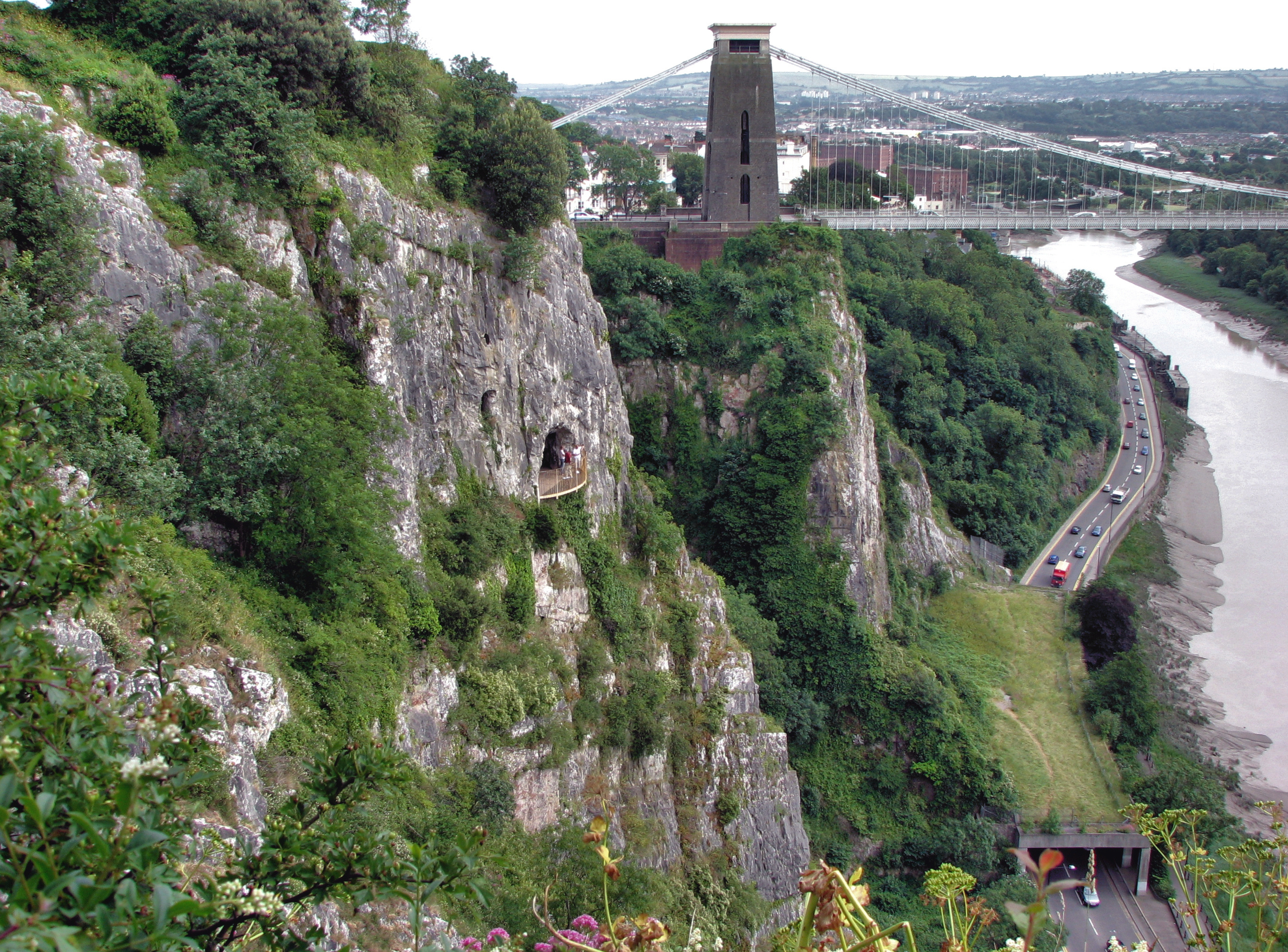
A4 passing under the Clifton Suspension Bridge

In the original 1922 road numbering list, the A4 ended at the junction between George Street and Milsom Street in Bath. On 1 April 1935, it was extended over the A431 and B4044 to Newbridge, and the A36 to Avonmouth.

From Queen Square, Bath, the A4 carries on to Queen Square Place and Charlotte Street, before heading along the Upper Bristol Road by Royal Victoria Park to Newbridge Road. The road crosses the River Avon on its way to join the A36 and becomes a dual carriageway again until the roundabout that forms the junction with the A39 Wells Road at the Globe Inn and exit for the nearby Bath Spa University. It continues on through the village of Saltford towards Keynsham where a roundabout splits the road and the A4 continues as a dual carriageway by-passing the town, crossing over the River Chew in the process.

The end of the by-pass coincides with the junction of the Avon Ring Road, the A4174. The route goes through the suburb of Brislington, going past Arnos Court Park and Arnos Vale Cemetery. The road runs over a bridge over the New Cut and into Temple Gate where Bristol Temple Meads railway station is located. The A4 no longer has a defined route from this point to the start of Anchor Road at The Centre; originally it went along Victoria Street and Baldwin Street before turning left onto St Augustine's Parade or, later, Broad Quay, but in more recent times it followed Redcliffe Way, via Redcliffe Roundabout (junction with the A38) across Queen Square to The Centre. From there it turns back towards Bristol Harbour via Anchor Road past the We The Curious science museum. After another roundabout the A4 follows along Hotwell Road and around a one-way system that merges the A4 with the A3029.

At this point the A4 regains trunk road classification and passes under the Clifton Suspension Bridge along the Portway. It heads out of the city into the suburbs of Sea Mills and Shirehampton before going under the M5 to end at the roundabout that feeds the motorway, the M49 and A403 in Avonmouth.

== Junction list ==
County	Location	mi	km	Destinations	Notes
Greater London	City of London	0.0	0.0	A40 / B500 north (Charterhouse Street) to B501 – West End, Holborn, Stratford, Barbican, King's Cross, Smithfield	Eastern terminus; continues as B500 beyond A40
Greater London	Westminster	0.7	1.1	Kingsway (A4200 north)	Southern terminus of A4200
Greater London	Westminster	0.8	1.3	Waterloo Bridge (A301 south)	No access from A4 east to A301 south or from A301 north to A4 west; northern terminus of A301
Greater London	Westminster	1.7	2.7	Regent Street (A4201 north)	Eastbound access only; southern terminus of A4201
Greater London	Westminster	2.4– 2.8	3.9– 4.5	Ring Road (A302 east / A4202 north) ― Westminster, Kilburn	Grade-separated junction; Kilburn signed westbound only
Greater London	Westminster― Kensington &Chelsea borough boundary	3.0	4.8	A3216 south (Sloane Street) – Chelsea, Sloane Square	Northern terminus of A3216
Greater London	Westminster― Kensington &Chelsea borough boundary	3.0	4.8	A315 west (Knightsbridge) – Kensington	Eastern terminus of A315
Greater London	Kensington & Chelsea	3.5	5.6	Brompton Road (A308 south-west) ― Fulham, Chelsea	No access from A3 east to A308; north-eastern terminus of A308
Greater London	Kensington & Chelsea	4.7	7.6	A3220 south (Earls Court Road) to A3212 – Battersea, Chelsea, Earl's Court, Westminster	Routes and Westminster signed eastbound only
Greater London	Kensington & Chelsea	4.9	7.9	A3220 north to A40 – Shepherd's Bush, Olympia	
Greater London	Hammersmith & Fulham	5.7– 6.3	9.2– 10.1	To A219 / A306 / A315 – Hammersmith	Hammersmith flyover; grade-separated junction
Greater London	Hounslow	7.1– 7.3	11.4– 11.7	A316 to M3 – Richmond, Chiswick	
Greater London	Hounslow	8.4	13.5	M4 west (Chiswick flyover) – Heathrow, Staines, Hounslow	Eastern terminus of M4; westbound exit and eastbound entrance
Greater London	Hounslow	8.6	13.8	A205 east (South Circular) / A406 east (North Circular) to A315 / M1 / A40 – Richmond, Wembley, Ealing, Kew	Richmond, Wembley, and Ealing signed westbound only, Kew eastbound only; western terminus of A205 / A406
Greater London	Hounslow	9.2– 9.4	14.8– 15.1	M4 west – Heathrow, Slough	Westbound exit and entrance
Greater London	Hounslow	9.2– 9.4	14.8– 15.1	M4 east – Central London, Hammersmith	Eastbound exit and entrance
Greater London	Hounslow	9.9	15.9	A3002 (Boston Manor Road) – Brentford, Hanwell	
Greater London	Hounslow	12.4	20.0	A3005 (Lampton Road / Heston Road) – Hounslow, Southall, Heston	Southall and Heston signed westbound only; most access via Jersey Road
Greater London	Hounslow	12.8	20.6	A3063 (Sutton Lane / Upper Sutton Lane) – Hounslow, Southall, Heston	No access from A4 west to A3063 north or from A4 east to A3063 south; Southall and Heston signed eastbound only
Greater London	Hounslow	13.7	22.0	A3006 east (Bath Road) – Hounslow	No access from A3006 to A4 east; western terminus of A3006
Greater London	Hounslow	13.8	22.2	A30 west (Great South-West Road) – Heathrow, Staines	Eastern terminus of A30
Greater London	Hounslow	14.2	22.9	A312 to M4 / M25 / A30 – Feltham, Harrow, Hayes, Cranford, Heathrow	To A30 and Heathrow signed eastbound only
Greater London	Hillingdon	15.6	25.1	A437 north (High Street) / Hatton Road North – Harlington, Heathrow Airport (Terminals 4 & Cargo)	Southern terminus of A437
Greater London	Hillingdon	16.2	26.1	A408 (Sipson Road) / Nene Road – Sipson, Heathrow Airport (Terminals 1, 2 & 3)	Southern terminus of A408
Greater London	Hillingdon	17.4	28.0	A3044 north (Hatch Lane) – West Drayton, Harmondsworth	A3044 and destinations signed eastbound only; eastern terminus of A3044 concurrency
Greater London	Hillingdon	18.1	29.1	A3044 south (Stanwell Moor Road) to M25 / Saxon Way – Heathrow Airport, Staines, Colnbrook, Poyle, Longford, Harmondsworth	To M25, Heathrow, Staines, and Harmondsworth signed westbound only; western terminus of A3044 concurrency
Berkshire	Slough	20.5	33.0	M4 to M25 – London, Reading, Windsor, Maidenhead, Heathrow Airport	M4 junction 5
Berkshire	Slough	22.5	36.2	A412 (Uxbridge Road) to A332 / B376 – Uxbridge, Datchet, Windsor, Watford	Watford signed eastbound only
Berkshire	Slough	23.9	38.5	A355 (Tuns Lane / Farnham Road) / M4 / M40 – Windsor, Beaconsfield	
Berkshire	Slough	25.8	41.5	M4 – London, Reading	M4 junction 7
Buckinghamshire― Berkshire county boundary	Taplow― Maidenhead boundary	27.9– 28.0	44.9– 45.1	Maidenhead Bridge over River Thames	
Berkshire	Maidenhead	28.0	45.1	A4094 north (Ray Mead Road) – Cookham	Southern terminus of A4094
Berkshire	Maidenhead	29.0	46.7	A308 (Frascati Way / Marlow Road) to M4 / A330 – Winsor, Bracknell, Marlow	
Berkshire		30.8	49.6	A404(M) south / A404 east to M4 / M40 / A4130 – Reading, Slough, Windsor, Wycombe, Marlow, Oxford, Henley	Reading signed westbound only; northern terminus of A404(M); western terminus of A404; A404(M) junction 9B
Berkshire	Hare Hatch	35.1	56.5	A3032 south-west (London Road) – Ruscombe, Twyford	Twyford signed eastbound only; north-eastern terminus of A3032
Berkshire	Twyford	36.2	58.3	A321 (Wargrave Road) – Twyford, Wokingham, Wargrave, Henley	
Berkshire	Charvil	37.5	60.4	A3032 north-east (Old Bath Road) / B478 (Charvil Lane) – Twyford, Charvil, Sonning	South-western terminus of A3032
Berkshire	Earley	40.0	64.4	A3290 to A329(M) / M4 / Thomas Valley Park – Wokingham, Bracknell	
Berkshire	Reading	40.5	65.2	A329 – Wokingham, Earley	
Berkshire	Reading	40.5	65.2	Begin one-way	
Berkshire	Reading	41.3	66.5	A327 south (Silver Street)	Westbound junction
Berkshire	Reading	41.7	67.1	A329 north to A33 / M4 – Caversham A327 (Mill Lane) – Aldershot	Eastbound junction
Berkshire	Reading	41.4	66.6	Southampton Street (A327 north / M4 east) to A33 / M4 / A329 – Caversham	Westbound junction
Berkshire	Reading	41.4	66.6	End one-way	
Berkshire	Reading	42.5	68.4	Bath Road (A4155 north-east) ― Town centre	Southeastern terminus of A4155
Berkshire	Theale	45.9	73.9	M4 – London, South Wales, Newbury, Oxford	M4 junction 12
Berkshire		47.2	76.0	A340 north / The Grn – Pangbourne, Theale	Eastern terminus of A340 concurrency
Berkshire		49.9	80.3	A340 south (Basingstroke Road) – Basingstoke, Aldermaston, Tadley	Western terminus of A340 concurrency
Berkshire	Newbury	58.2	93.7	A339 / B4009 north-east (Shaw Road) to A34 / M4 – Basingstoke, Winchester, Oxford, Hermitage	South-western terminus of B4009
Berkshire		59.8– 60.1	96.2– 96.7	A34 to A303 / M3 / M4 – Winchester, Basingstoke, Southampton, The Midlands, Oxford	Grade-separated junction on M34
Berkshire	Eddington	66.7	107.3	A338 north to M4 – Wantage, RAF Welford	Eastern terminus of A338 concurrency
Berkshire	Hungerford	67.0	107.8	A338 south (Bridge Street) – Town centre, Salisbury	Western terminus of A338 concurrency
Wiltshire	Marlborough	76.6	123.3	A346 south (Salisbury Street) to A338 – Salisbury	Eastern terminus of A346 concurrency
Wiltshire	Marlborough	76.8	123.6	A346 north (Barn Street) to M4 – Swindon, Ramsbury, Ogbourne	Western terminus of A346 concurrency
Wiltshire	Marlborough	77.2	124.2	A345 south (Pewsey Road) – Amesbury	Northern terminus of A345
Wiltshire	Avebury	83.6	134.5	A4361 north (Beckhampton Road) / A361 west – Swindon, Wroughton, Devizes, Bishops Cannings	Southern terminus of A4361; eastern terminus of A361
Wiltshire	Calne	89.7	144.4	A3102 south-west (Silver Street) – Melksham	Eastern terminus of A3102 concurrency
Wiltshire	Calne	90.5	145.6	A3102 north-east (Greenacres Way) – Wootton Bassett, Lyneham	Western terminus of A3102 concurrency
Wiltshire		93.0	149.7	A342 south-east (Old Derry Hill) – Devizes, Sandy Lane, Derry Hill	Derry Hill signed eastbound only; north-western terminus of A342
Wiltshire	Chippenham	98.0	157.7	A350 (West Cephan Way) to M4 / A361 – Cirencester, Warminster, Melksham, Trowbridge, Castle Combe	Castle Combe signed eastbound only
Wiltshire	Box	103.3	166.2	A365 south-east (Devizes Road) – Melksham, MoD Corsham	MoD Corsham signed eastbound only; north-western terminus of A365
Somerset	Bathford	106.2	170.9	A363 south-east (Bradford Road) / London Road East – Bradford-on-Avon, Batheaston, Monkton Farleigh, Bathford, Colerne	North-eastern terminus of A363
Somerset	Bath	107.2– 107.6	172.5– 173.2	A46 north to M4 / London Road East – Stroud, Batheaston	Southern terminus of A46
Somerset	Bath	108.6	174.8	Cleveland Place to A36 – Warminster	
Somerset	Bath	108.7	174.9	London Street (A3039 south)	Northern terminus of A3039
Somerset	Bath	109.3	175.9	Charles Street (A367 south) to A36	To A36 westbound only; northern terminus of A367
Somerset	Bath	110.1	177.2	Windsor Bridge Road (A3064 south) ― Twerton	Twerton signed eastbound only; northern terminus of A3604
Somerset	Bath	110.3	177.5	A431 north-west (Newbridge Hill) – Kelston, Bitton, Weston	No access from A4 east to A431 or from A431 to A4 west; south-eastern terminus of A431
Somerset		111.6	179.6	A36 south-east (Lower Bristol Road) – Twerton, Bath	North-western terminus of A36
Somerset		112.4	180.9	A39 south-west (Wells Road) to A368 / Pennyquick – Wells, Weston-super-Mare, Corston, Marksbury, Newton St Loe, Combe Down	Weston-super-Mare signed westbound only; north-eastern terminus of A39
Somerset	Keynsham	117.2	188.6	A4174 north / A4175 north (Durley Hill) to M4 / M5 north / A431 / A420 – Keynsham, Longwell Green, Hanham, Kingswood	Eastern terminus of A4174 concurrency; southern terminus of A4175
Somerset	Bristol	118.5	190.7	A4174 south (West Town Lane) to A37 – Bristol Airport, Whitchurch, Knowle, Stockwood	To A37 signed eastbound only; western terminus of A4174 concurrency
Somerset	Bristol	119.6	192.5	A4320 north (St. Phillips Causeway) to M32 / M4 / M5 north – City centre	City centre signed westbound only; southern terminus of A4320
Somerset	Bristol	120.4	193.8	A37 south (Wells Road) to A39 – Yeovil, Wells	Northern terminus of A37
Somerset	Bristol	120.6	194.1	A370 south-west (York Road) to M5 south / A4 / A38 – Avonmouth, Weston, Taunton, Bristol Airport	Bristol Airport signed eastbound only; North-eastern terminus of A370
Somerset	Bristol	120.8	194.4	Redcliffe Way / Temple Gate (A4044)	Western terminus of eastern segment
Somerset	Bristol	120.8	194.4	Gap in route in downtown Bristol	
Somerset	Bristol	120.8	194.4	St. Augustine's Parade (A38 north) / College Green (A4018 north) to M32 / M4 / M5 / A4 / A37 / A420 – Gloucester, Bath, Shepton Mallet, Chippenham	Eastern terminus of western segment; southern terminus of A38 / A4018
Somerset	Bristol	121.9– 122.1	196.2– 196.5	Brunel Way (A3029 south) to A370 / A4 / A38 – Weston-super-Mare, Bristol Airport, Bath, Taunton	Northern terminus of A3029
Somerset	Bristol	122.7	197.5	A4176 north-east (Bridge Valley Road) to A4018 – Clifton, Westbury-on-Trym	No access from A4176 to A4 west; information signed westbound only; South-western terminus of A4176
Somerset	Bristol	125.2	201.5	Sylvan Way (A4162 east) ― Westbury-on-Trym, Lawrence Weston, Sea Mills	Sea Mills signed westbound only; western terminus of A4162
Somerset	Bristol	127.4	205.0	M5 / B4054 south-east (Avonmouth Road) to M49 / M4 – Royal Portbury Dock, Shirehampton	Royal Portbury Dock signed westbound only; north-western terminus of B4054
Somerset	Bristol	127.7	205.5	M5 to M49 / M4 / Avonmouth Way – Royal Portbury Dock	
Somerset	Bristol	128.0	206.0	A403 north-east (St. Andrew's Road) / McLaren Road / King Road – Severn Beach, Aust	Western terminus; south-western terminus of A403
1.000 mi = 1.609 km; 1.000 km = 0.621 mi
