= George John Bennett (organist) =

English cathedral organist and composer

George John Bennett, Mus.Doc. (5 May 1863 –1930) was an English cathedral organist and composer, who served in Lincoln Cathedral from 1895.

== Background ==
George John Bennett was born on 5 May 1863 in Andover, Hampshire. He studied at the Royal Academy of Music under G. A. Macfarren and C. Steggall, and also abroad, in Berlin under H. Barth (piano) and F. Kiel (composition) as well as in Munich (1885–1887) under H. Bussmeyer (1853–1930, piano) and Josef Rheinberger (composition).

== Career ==
Organist of:

- St. John's Church, Pimlico
- Lincoln Cathedral (1895–1930)

== Family ==
Bennett married, at Lincoln Cathedral on 20 February 1900, Marion Ruston, second daughter of Joseph Ruston, of Monks Manor, Lincoln, a former MP and Mayor of Lincoln. The ceremony was performed by the Lord Bishop of Lincoln, assisted by the Dean of Lincoln and the Archdeacon of Lincoln.

== Works ==
- 2 overtures for orchestra
- Suite in D minor for orchestra
- Mass in B flat major for soli, choir and orchestra
- Piano trio in E major
- Piano pieces
- Organ pieces

Cultural offices
Preceded by John Matthew Wilson Young	Organist and Master of the Choristers of Lincoln Cathedral; 1895–1930	Succeeded by Gordon Archbold Slater
