= Pewsham =

Village in Wiltshire, England

Coordinates: 51.441°N 2.076°W

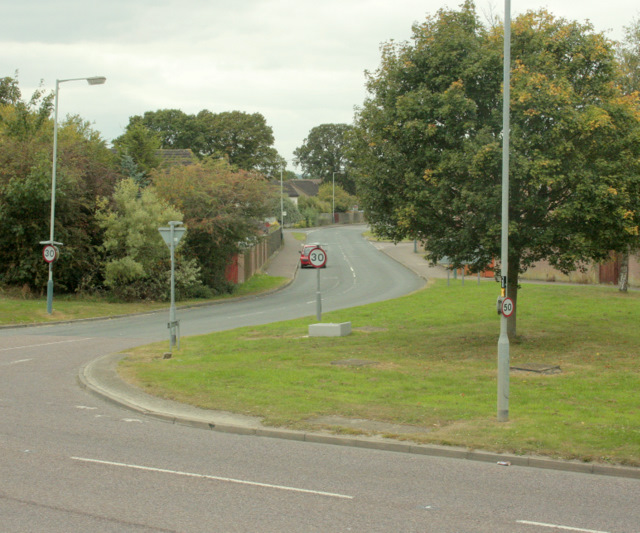
- Lodge Road

- Location within Wiltshire
- OS grid reference: ST947713
  - London: 93 miles (150 km)
- Civil parish: Chippenham
- Unitary authority: Wiltshire
- Ceremonial county: Wiltshire
- Region: South West
- Country: England
- Sovereign state: United Kingdom
- Post town: CHIPPENHAM
- Postcode district: SN15
- Dialling code: 01249
- Police: Wiltshire
- Fire: Dorset and Wiltshire
- Ambulance: South Western
- UK Parliament: Chippenham

Pewsham is an area in the south-east of the town of Chippenham on the A4 national route towards Calne in Wiltshire, England.

== Description ==
Pewsham encompasses a south-eastern suburb of Chippenham; the electoral division named Chippenham Pewsham extends beyond the housing estate into the rural areas to the south and west. The boundaries of the division follow the River Avon in the east and south, and the Wilts & Berks Canal in the south-west.

In the west, along the A4 road, are a small business centre called Forest Gate, a car dealership and a pub named The Pewsham. Set back behind the pub is Pewsham House, built in red brick in 1892; it was designed in 17th-century style by the Wiltshire architect Charles Ponting.

The Cocklemore Brook drains the farmland south of the A4, and flows into the Avon near Pewsham Locks, a set of three locks on the canal. The closest neighbouring village is Derry Hill, in particular the 'Old Derry Hill' area at the foot of the hill, just beyond the pub.

In the late 1980s and early 1990s, when large housing developments spread across several Wiltshire towns, Pewsham was the name given to Chippenham's new residential district in the south-east of the town. The diverted A4 which forms the district's perimeter road is named Pewsham Way.

== Forest and parishes ==
There was a royal forest in the area from the 13th century, sometimes called Chippenham forest, at other times Pewsham and Bowood forest.

Pewsham was one of several areas that in 1842 formed the ecclesiastical parish for the newly consecrated Christ Church at Derry Hill; until then Pewsham was extra-parochial, i.e. outside any parish, presumably because it had been largely uninhabited woodland or wood-pasture.

The population of the Pewsham extra-parochial area peaked at 480 in 1841. It was made a civil parish in 1858, at the same time as many other extra-parochial places. In 1884 Nethermore to the south-east (formerly a detached tithing of Chippenham, with nine houses) was added to the parish, as was an area to the south; thus the parish extended as far south and west as the edges of the Lackham House and Bowden Park estates. The 1889 Ordnance Survey map shows Pewsham as a rural parish with no significant settlements apart from the houses and church at Derry Hill.

The parish was enlarged further in 1934, taking an area from Chippenham Without, so that it extended northwards beyond Tytherton Lucas; the area transferred had a population of 260 at the 1931 census. Pewsham parish was abolished on 1 April 1984, its built-up area transferred to Chippenham parish and the rural remainder to Calne Without and Bremhill. In 1971 the parish had a population of 1332. Further boundary changes which came into effect in May 2025 reduced the size of Calne Without parish and renamed the remainder to Derry Hill & Studley.

== Local government ==
Pewsham forms part of Chippenham civil parish, where the first tier of local government is Chippenham Town Council. All other local government functions are carried out by Wiltshire Council, a unitary authority. The Pewsham electoral division elects one member of Wiltshire Council.

== Pewsham Locks ==
The Wilts & Berks Canal, completed in this area in 1797, ran from south-west to north-east, and under a bridge on the A4 near the present-day Hyundai dealership. The canal was abandoned in 1914 but is under restoration by the Wilts & Berks Canal Trust. Three locks and a dry dock south of the A4 at grid reference ST969710 are at the north end of a re-watered stretch of canal. The canal towpath is an amenity for local residents, and is accessible only via footpaths; one path continues to Lacock.
