= John Matthew Wilson Young =

English organist (1822–1897)

John Matthew Wilson Young (17 December 1822 in Durham – 4 March 1897 in Lincoln) was an English organist. He was elder brother to William James Young (1835 in Durham – 1913 in Lancashire), also a well-known English organist. John M.W. Young was buried in the cemetery at East Gate in Lincoln. He married Augusta Frushard (1820 in Lambeth – 1902 in Lincoln), youngest daughter of Philip Frushard (13 October 1783 in India – 5 July 1837 in Durham), the Governor of Durham Gaol, and Anna Maria Pewsey his wife, on 8 July 1851 at St. Paul's Church, Deptford, Kent.

== Career ==
He was successively:

- A chorister at Durham Cathedral
- Assistant Organist of Durham Cathedral, 1843 to 1850
- Organist of Lincoln Cathedral, 1850 to 1895

== Publications ==
The psalter, as used in Lincoln Cathedral, John Matthew Wilson Young, Henry Wollaston Hutton, George John Bennett, W.K. Morton & Sons, 1912

== Children ==
- Augusta Anna Maria Young (1852–1921)
- John Frederick Sebastion Young (1853–1873)
- Philip Frushard Young (1855–?)
- Edward Muir Young (ca. 1857–1915)
- Alfred Hamilton Frushard Young (1858–1936)
- Walter Frushard Young (ca. 1859–1875)
- Rosetta Catherine Young (1860–ca. 1914)
- Ada Frushard Young (1862–1943)
- Richard Samuel Frushard Young (1868–1894)

Cultural offices
| Preceded by George Skelton | Organist and Master of the Choristers of Lincoln Cathedral; 1850–1895 | Succeeded by George Bennett |
