= Derry Hill =

Village in Wiltshire, England

Coordinates: 51.437°N 2.058°W

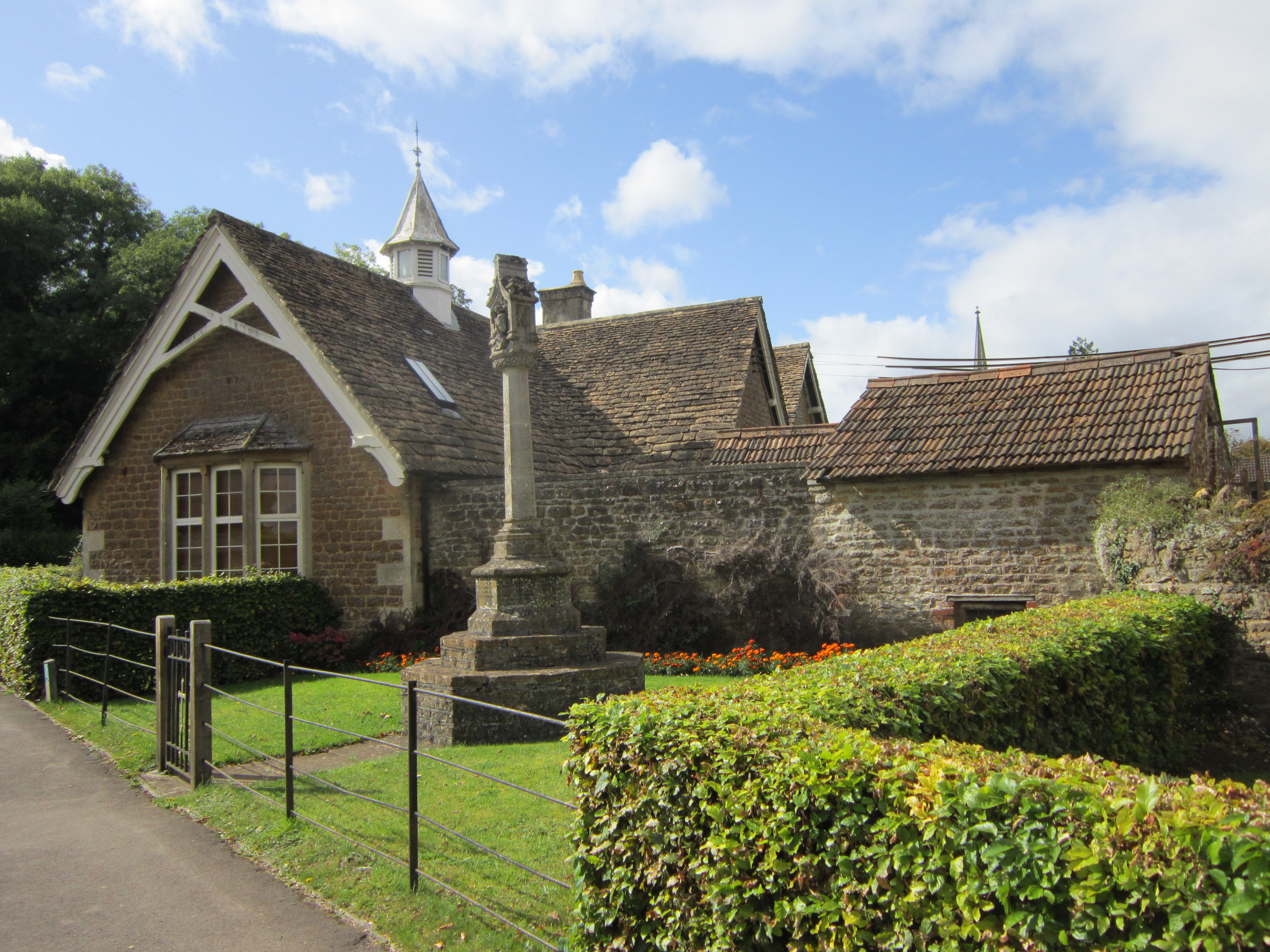
- Derry Hill war memorial, behind the former village school which is in Bowood Estate style

- Location within Wiltshire
- OS grid reference: ST961709
- Civil parish: Derry Hill & Studley
- Unitary authority: Wiltshire
- Ceremonial county: Wiltshire
- Region: South West
- Country: England
- Sovereign state: United Kingdom
- Post town: Calne
- Postcode district: SN11
- Dialling code: 01249
- Police: Wiltshire
- Fire: Dorset and Wiltshire
- Ambulance: South Western
- UK Parliament: Chippenham

Derry Hill is a village in the English county of Wiltshire, in the civil parish of Derry Hill & Studley. It has an elevated position at the northern edge of the Bowood House estate, about 3 miles (5 km) south-east of the centre of the town of Chippenham.

== Geography ==
Derry Hill lies to the south of the A4 road between Chippenham and Calne. The old London to Bristol road turned left after the Soho Inn, along what is now the village's Church Road, to join the Devizes road; then the old road descended Old Derry Hill. The modern section of the road, avoiding the steep descent, was built between 1787 and 1810, and is now part of the A4.

Previously, Derry Hill was in the vicinity of the Calne branch of the Wilts & Berks Canal that followed the course of the River Marden; the Wilts & Berks Canal Trust aims to restore the canal to run through the village, just north of Church Road.

The Chippenham and Calne branch of the Great Western Railway passed by the village, from its opening in 1863 until its closure to passengers in 1965.

Nearby towns: Chippenham, Calne, Devizes

Nearby villages: Studley, Lacock, Pewsham, Sandy Lane

== History ==
Derry Hill grew out of the ancient settlement of Studley. In the 18th century, there were several small settlements along the London to Bristol road, near the north-west corner of Bowood House Park; among them, a settlement known as Red Hill, possibly squatters' cottages. The original hamlet of Derry Hill, now known as 'Old Derry Hill', lies at the foot of the hill by the A4/A342 junction. Most houses now standing in the upper village were built in the 19th or 20th century, with some 19th-century ones built on 18th-century house sites.

The monumental entrance arch to the Bowood estate, at the south-west of the village opposite the Lansdowne Arms, was built in 1834–1838 for the 3rd Marquess of Lansdowne. Its asymmetric Italianate design, with tall campanile, is by Charles Barry whose many other works include the rebuilding of the Palace of Westminster. Known as the Golden Gates, it is a Grade II* listed structure, described by Historic England as "a major work of the C19 Italianate style".

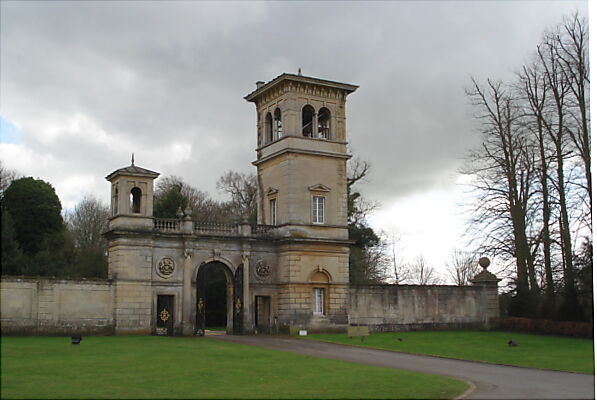
North entrance to the Bowood estate, known as the Golden Gates

The village traditionally provided houses for the Bowood estate workers. The estate's Christ Church helped the village develop in the early 19th century. In 1843, a school was built, again with help from the Bowood estate; previously, classes for the village children were held in various places around the village. Street lighting was installed in 1878.

The main development has taken place since the early-1970s, when a new housing estate, consisting of about 220 houses, was built in the fields immediately to the north of village—between the old road, leading to the Devizes road, and the present A4 road. Until then, the village was essentially one road; as a result, the population grew sharply, requiring the school's extension. Further stages of development took place around the village in the 1990s.

A small building called the Well House was restored by the Wiltshire Historic Buildings Trust in 2002–2003.

In late-2006 a housing development of 25 new homes commenced on village land adjacent to the A4 national route, and a small number of large, individual new homes were also built during 2005–2006.

The western end of the village, including estate houses, the pub and the Golden Gates, was made a Conservation Area in 1986.

== Amenities ==
The village has a shop, a Church of England parish church, a primary school, a pre-school, and a pub known since 1838 as the Lansdowne Arms (its building dating back to 1843).

A new village hall with sports facilities was built in 2000, and named the Lansdowne Hall in memory of the 8th Lord Lansdowne, who had died in 1997. It replaced a smaller building provided in 1873 as a school by the Lansdownes.

== Governance ==
Derry Hill lies within the parish of Derry Hill & Studley, created by renaming Calne Without parish, effective in May 2025. The parish includes the nearby village of Studley, and extends south through the Bowood estate to take in the small village of Sandy Lane. At county level the unitary authority is Wiltshire Council. The village is in the Chippenham parliamentary constituency.

== Religious sites ==
=== Church of England ===
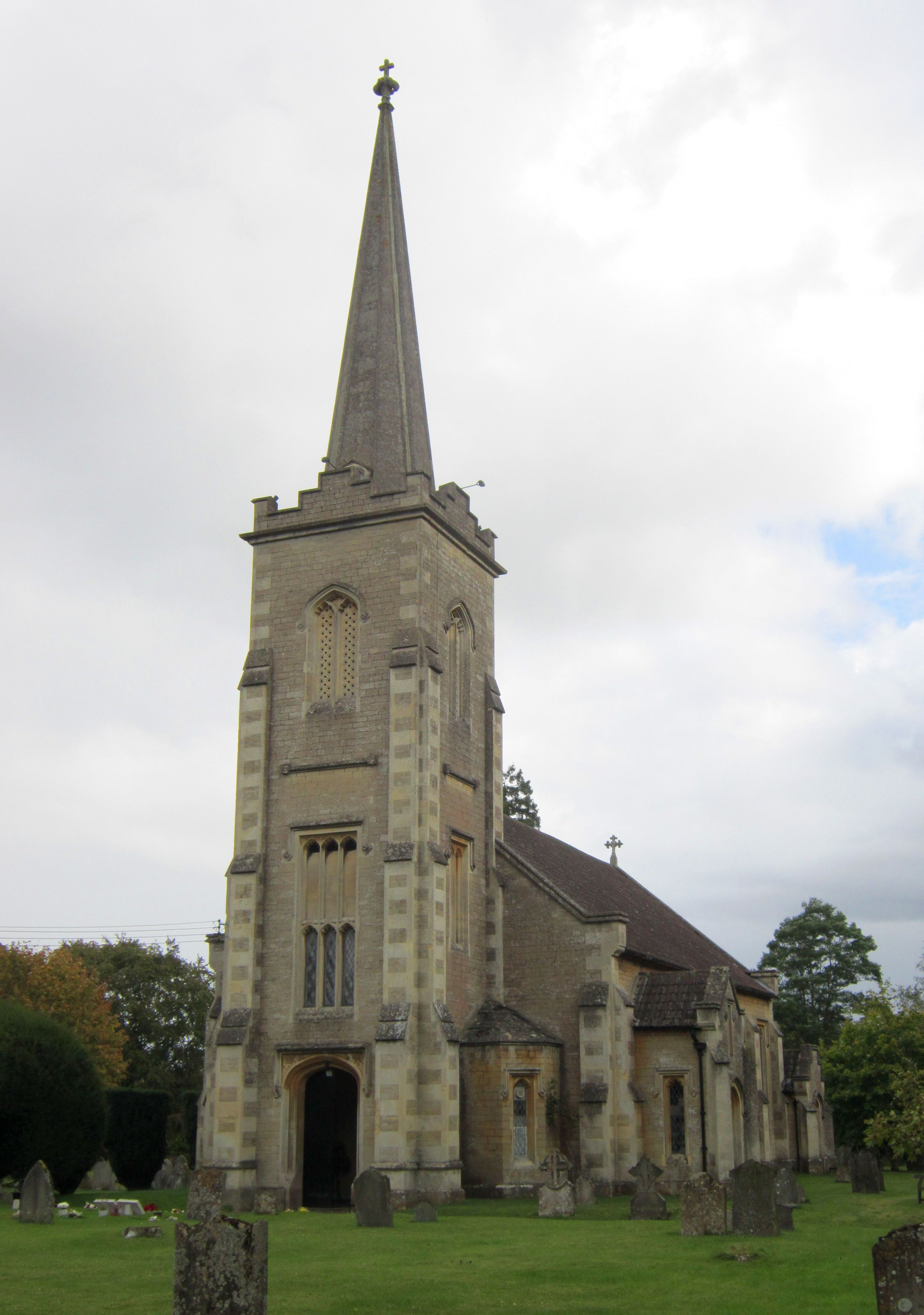
Christ Church

Christ Church was built in the west of the village in 1839–1840 to a design by T. H. Wyatt and D. Brandon. It is in the Late Perpendicular Gothic style, in dressed stone, and decorated inside. There were three banks of pews (556 seats) in a wide nave with a small sanctuary. The west tower with a needle spire was provided by the 3rd Lord Lansdowne at a cost of £111. Later, c.1862, an organ was provided. Before the choir stalls were built in 1953–1954, the choir had sung from the gallery. Other improvements to the church in the 20th century included re-seating the nave in 1936, and replacing the stone roof tiles with slate, together with other general repairs, in 1961–1962.

The church was used regularly by the Lansdowne family for weddings and funerals when their private chapel was too small. Tombs in the churchyard include those of the 5th Marquess of Lansdowne (d.1927) and his wife Maud (d.1932).

Derry Hill was anciently part of the extensive Calne parish. In 1841 a chapelry district was created for the new church, its area taken from the west part of Calne parish and parts of the parishes of Bremhill and Chippenham, together with detached parts of Corsham and Bishop's Cannings parishes and the extra-parochial areas of Bowood and Pewsham. The population of the new district was estimated to be between 1400 and 1500. At first the district included Sandy Lane village, but in 1864 that southern part was transferred to Chittoe parish.

In 1994, the Derry Hill vicarage was united with that of Bremhill and Foxham, with one vicar covering both parishes. Today the church is covered by the Marden Valley team ministry, alongside St Mary's and Holy Trinity at Calne, and the churches at Bremhill, Foxham and Blackland. The parish registers from 1840 (baptisms and burials) and 1842 (marriages), other than those in current use, are held in the Wiltshire and Swindon Record Office.

=== Others ===
A small Baptist chapel was built in ironstone on Studley Lane in the west end of the village in 1814, and continues in use as Little Zoar Strict Baptist Chapel.

A Primitive Methodist chapel at the side of the former main road, at the bottom of the hill, has an 1857 date-stone. Built in brick with stone quoins and window surrounds, by 2004 it had been converted to a house.

== Primary school ==
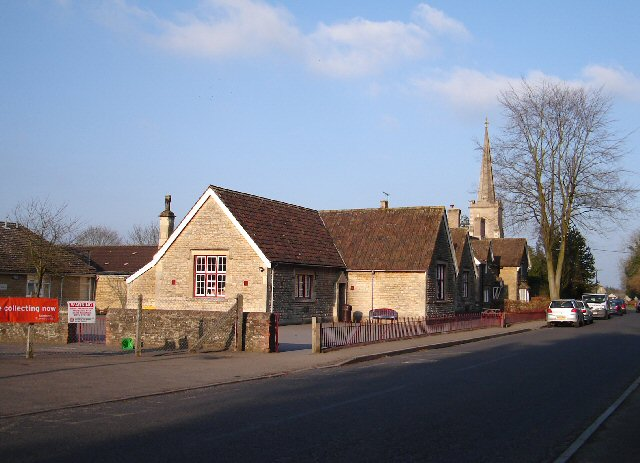
Derry Hill Primary School

A school aided by the National Society was built at Rag Lane in 1843, and until 1892 there was a second school at Buck Hill. The Rag Lane school was replaced by a new larger building (with teacher's house) to the west of the church in 1872. The school was taken over by Wiltshire County Council in 1905, and in 1906 the attendance was 152. Children of all ages were educated until 1930, when those over 11 transferred to Calne. Numbers fell, with 61 attending in 1955, then increased following housebuilding; an extension was completed in 1999. Today Derry Hill C of E Primary School has voluntary aided status.

In 2011, a teacher at the school was jailed for possessing and making indecent images of children.
