= Bowood House =

Country house in the United Kingdom

Coordinates: 51.4287°N 2.0377°W

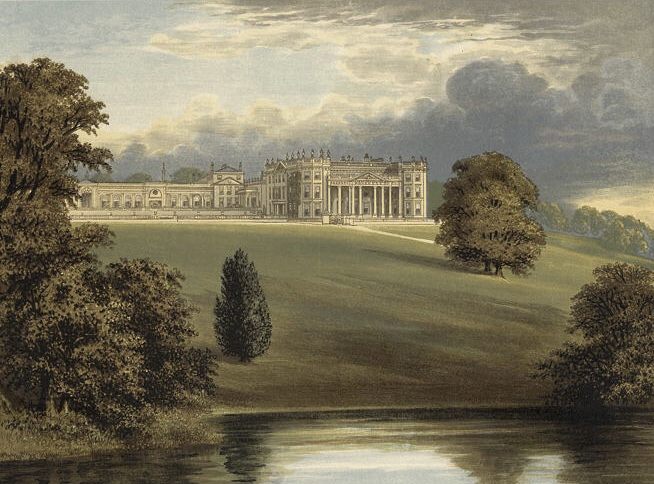
Bowood House from Morris's County Seats (1880). The block on the right is the "Big House", which has been demolished. The wing on the left, starting with the short tower, remains.

Bowood is a Grade I listed Georgian country house in Wiltshire, England, that has been owned for more than 250 years by the Fitzmaurice family. The house, with interiors by Robert Adam, stands in extensive grounds which include a garden designed by Lancelot "Capability" Brown. It is adjacent to the village of Derry Hill, halfway between Calne and Chippenham. The greater part of the house was demolished in 1956.

Since 1754 the estate has been the seat of the Earls of Shelburne, created Marquess of Lansdowne in 1784. The ninth and present Marquess is Charles Petty-Fitzmaurice. Notable guests have included Founding Father Benjamin Franklin and Mirabeau, an early leader of the French Revolution, among others.

== History ==
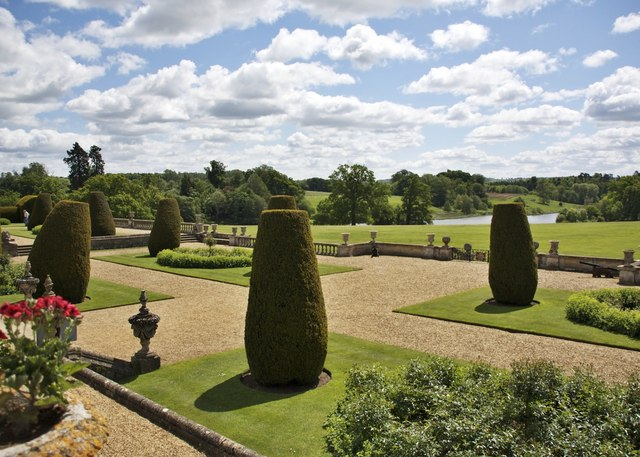
Italianate terrace gardens at Bowood

The first house at Bowood was built circa 1725 on the site of a hunting lodge, by the former tenant Sir Orlando Bridgeman, 2nd Baronet, who had purchased the property from the Crown. His grandfather Sir Orlando Bridgeman, Lord Chief Justice of the Common Pleas, had been granted the lease by Charles II. Bridgeman got into financial strife, and in 1739 under a Chancery decree, the house and park were acquired by his principal creditor, Richard Long. In 1754 Long sold it to the first Earl of Shelburne, who engaged the architect Henry Keene to extend the house.

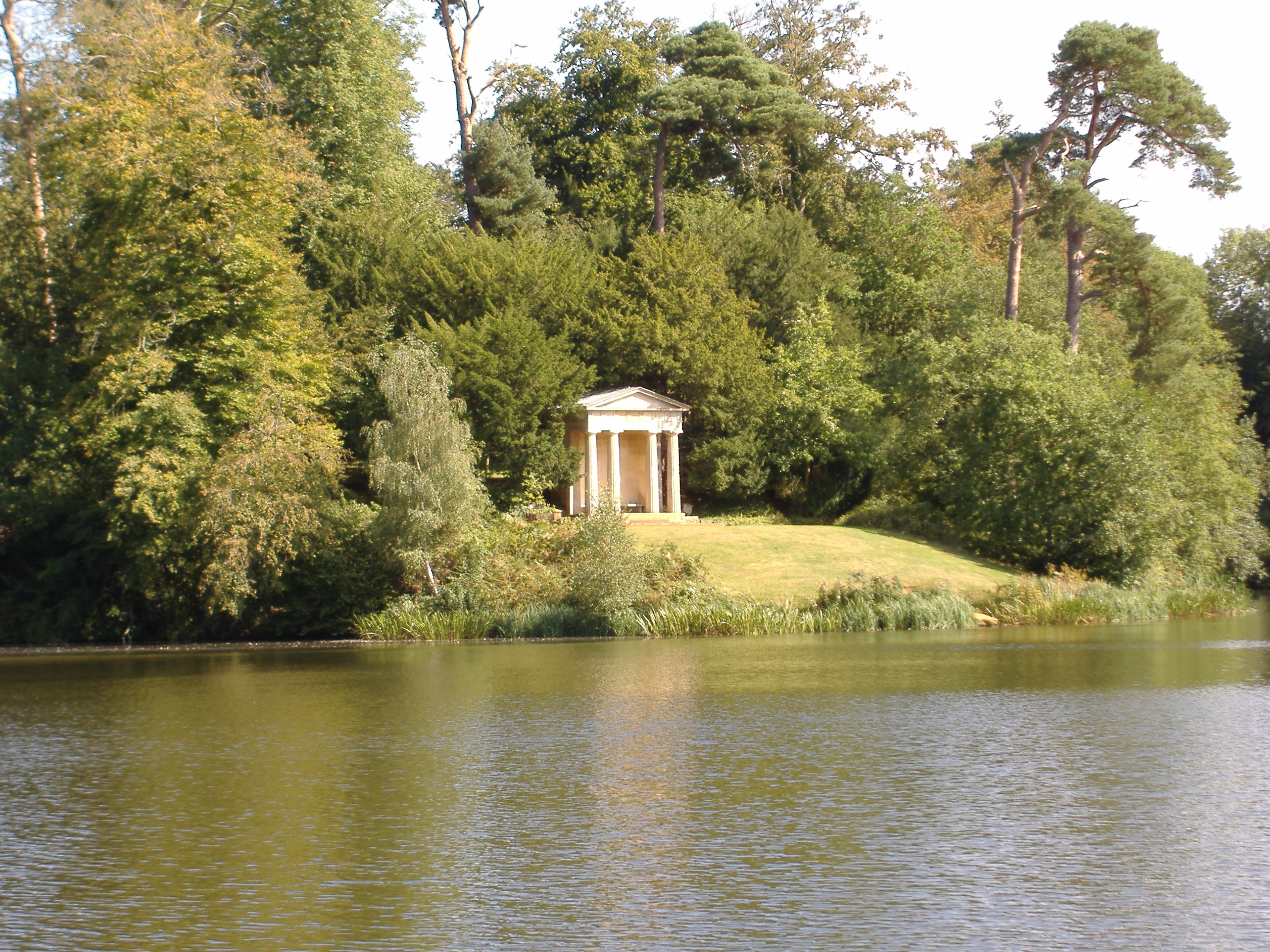
The Doric Temple folly in the landscape gardens designed by Lancelot "Capability" Brown

William Petty, 2nd Earl of Shelburne, who served as Prime Minister from 1782 to 1783, was created Marquess of Lansdowne to negotiate peace with America after the War of Independence. He furnished Bowood and his London home, Lansdowne House, with superb collections of paintings and classical sculpture, and commissioned Robert Adam to decorate the grander rooms in Bowood and to add a magnificent orangery, as well as a small menagerie for wild animals where a leopard and an orangutan were kept in the 18th century. Adam also built a fine mausoleum in the park for the first earl. Adam commissioned Benjamin Carter to sculpt chimney-pieces for the house.

In the 1770s the two parts of the house at Bowood (the "Big House" and the "Little House") were joined by the construction of an enormous drawing room.

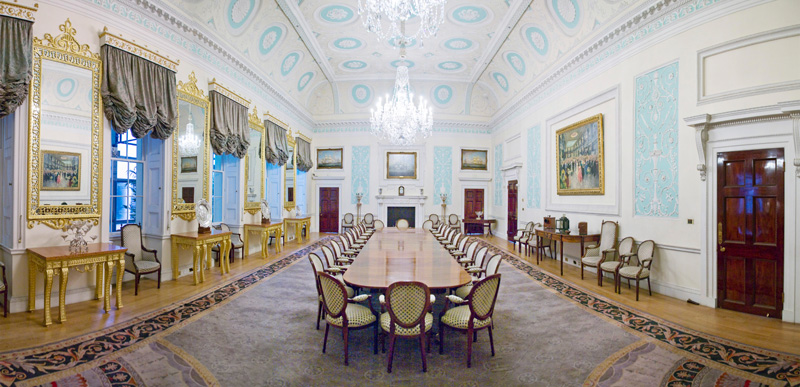
The Adam Room, as reinstalled at Lloyd's building, London

In World War I, the 5th Marchioness set up an auxiliary Red Cross hospital in the orangery. During World War II, the Big House was first occupied by a school, then by the Royal Air Force. Afterwards it was left empty, and by 1955, it was so dilapidated that the 8th Marquess demolished it, employing architect F. Sortain Samuels to convert the Little House into a more comfortable home. Many country houses were knocked down at this period. Before it was demolished, the Adam dining room was auctioned and bought by the Lloyd's of London insurance market, which dismantled it and re-installed it as the Committee Room in its 1958 building. The room was subsequently moved in 1986 to the 11th floor of its current building, also on Lime Street in the City of London. A portico from the house was re-erected at Roath Court, Cardiff.

The mausoleum was designated as Grade I listed in 1960, and the remaining parts of the main house were given the same status in 1972.

== 21st century ==
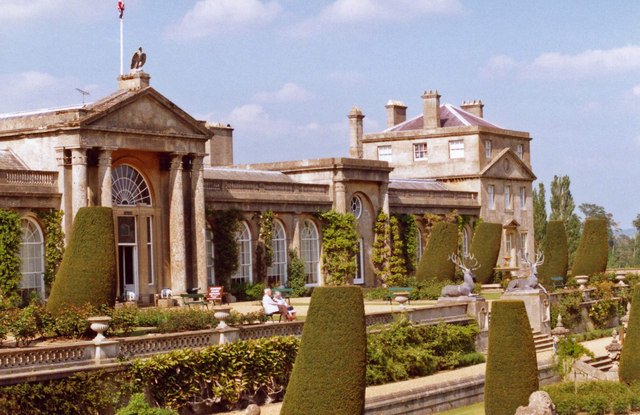
Bowood House, the Little House

The remaining house is still large, and the front wing is open to the public with rooms, paintings and sculpture on display. One of the rooms was the laboratory of Joseph Priestley, who discovered oxygen there on 1 August 1774. In the year 2000, Bowood House was designated an ACS National Historic Chemical Landmark in recognition of the importance of Priestley's discovery.

The lake was formed at the sacrifice of a village called Manning's Hill, which to this day remains submerged. In 2007, divers found the remains of two cottages and stone walls under the water.

On the grounds are an adventure playground for children aged 12 and under, a large waterfall, and many gardens incorporating 2 miles (3.2 km) of rhododendron walks in May and June, and carpets of daffodils, narcissi and bluebells in spring.

== Park and gardens ==
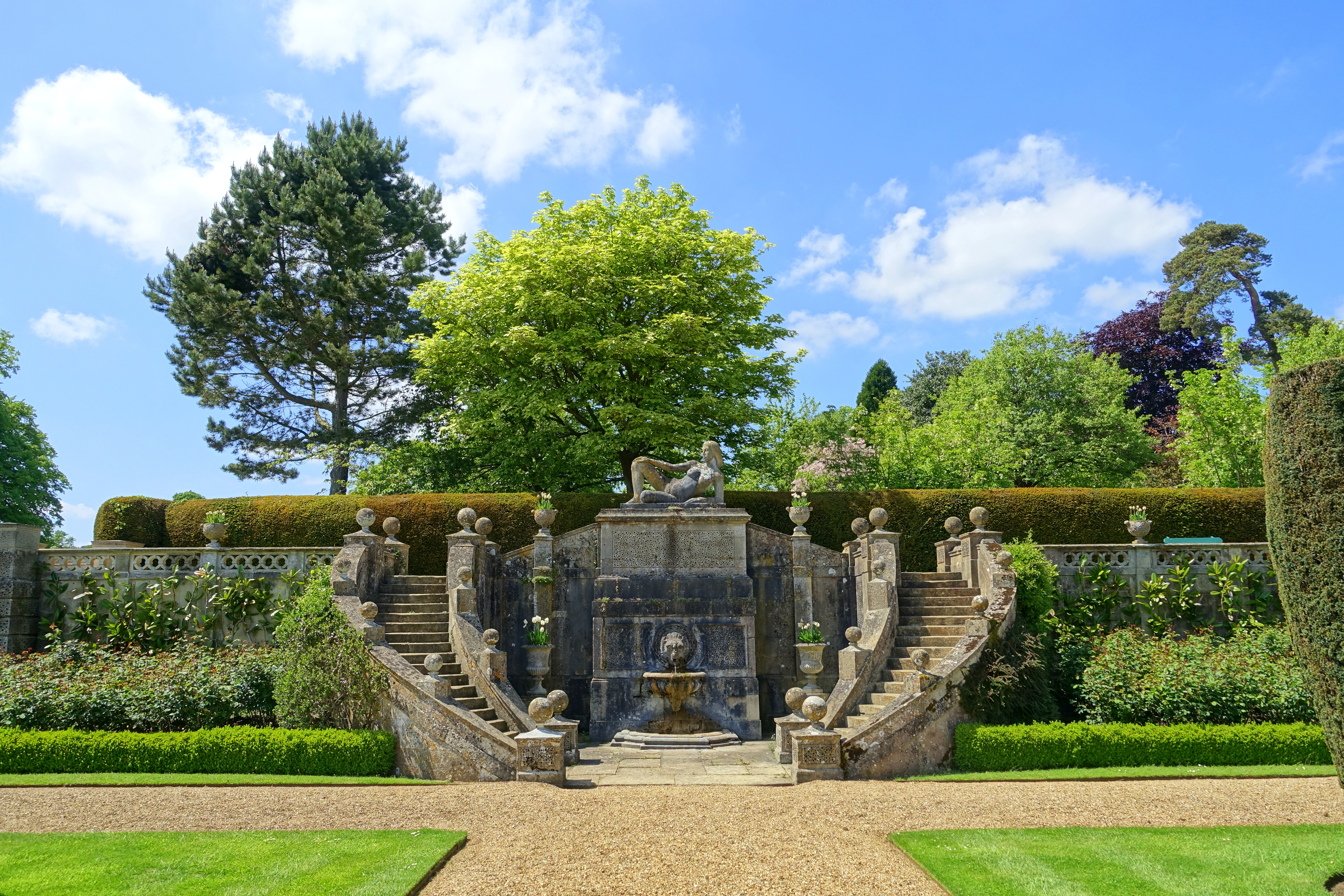
Stairway on the Terrace Gardens

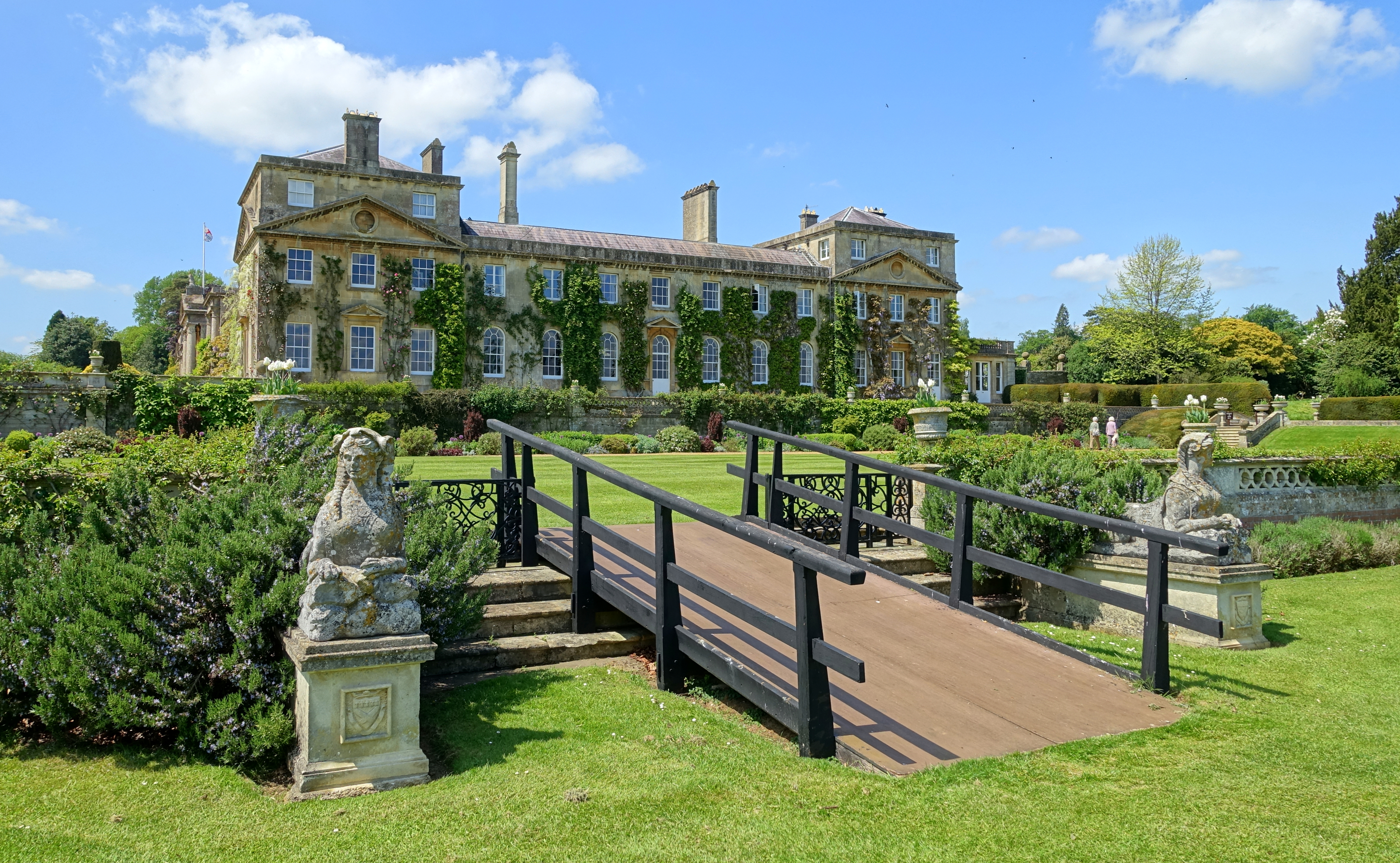
Side view of Bowood House

Bowood was laid out over 2,000 acres (8 km^{2}) in the 1760s. It replaced an earlier, more formal garden of avenues and wildernesses. Brown's design encompasses a sinuous lake (almost 1 km long), with lawns sloping gently down from the house, and drifts of mature trees. Submerged in the lake are foundations of cottages forming the Mannings Hill hamlet, rediscovered by divers in 2007 in shallow but heavily sedimented water.

Brown planted an arboretum of rare trees in the Pleasure Grounds behind the walled garden, and these were added to in the mid-19th century when a pinetum was begun. It was at about this time that the Doric Temple folly, originally situated by Brown in the Pleasure Grounds, was moved to its present position beside the lake.

In 1766, Lady Shelburne visited the landscape garden created by Charles Hamilton on his Surrey estate, Painshill Park. Hamilton was then asked to improve on Capability Brown's design. Working with Josiah Lane, the artisan stonemason who had built a cascade and grotto at Painshill Park, in the 1780s Hamilton added a cascade, grottoes and a hermit's cave to the lakeside.

The Italianate terrace gardens on the south front of the house were commissioned by the 3rd Marquess. The Upper Terrace, by Sir Robert Smirke, was completed in 1818, and the Lower, by George Kennedy, was added in 1851. Originally planted with hundreds of thousands of annuals in intricate designs, the parterres are now more simply planted.

In 1987 the formal garden, pleasure ground, park and woodland were listed as Grade I on the Register of Historic Parks and Gardens of special historic interest in England. A golf course was laid out towards the west of the park in the late 1990s and a hotel was opened nearby on the Home Farm site in 2009.

== Lansdowne residents ==
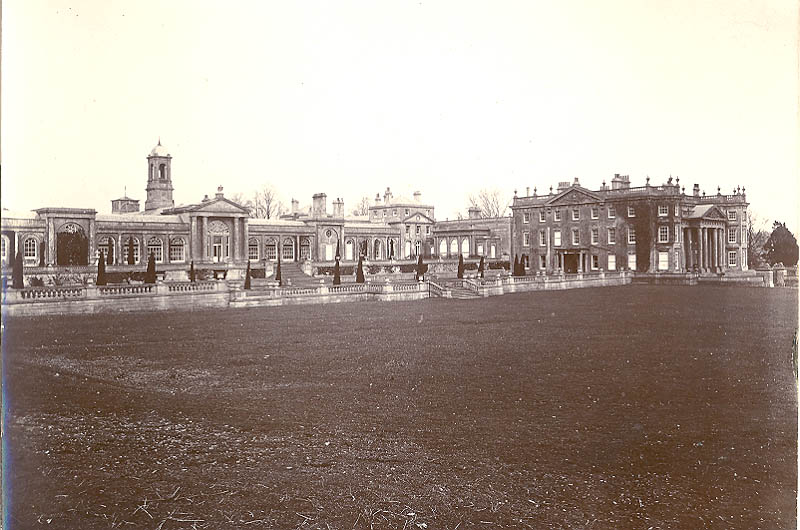
Bowood House in 1905; today only the orangery wings on the left remain, as the rest was part of the Destruction of country houses in 20th-century Britain

Bowood House is the stately home of the Lansdowne family and has been the residence of:

- John Petty, 1st Earl of Shelburne (1706–1761)
- William Petty Fitzmaurice, 2nd Earl of Shelburn & 1st Marquess of Lansdowne (1737–1805)
- John Henry Petty Fitzmaurice, 2nd Marquess of Lansdowne (1765–1809)
- Henry Petty-Fitzmaurice, 3rd Marquess of Lansdowne (1780–1863)
- Henry Charles Petty-Fitzmaurice, 4th Marquess of Lansdowne (1816–1866)
- Henry Charles Keith Petty-Fitzmaurice, 5th Marquess of Lansdowne (1845–1927)
- Henry William Edmund Petty-Fitzmaurice, 6th Marquess of Lansdowne (1872–1936)
- Charles Hope Petty-Fitzmaurice, 7th Marquess of Lansdowne (1917–1944)
- George John Charles Petty-Fitzmaurice, 8th Marquess of Lansdowne (1912–1999)
- Charles Petty-Fitzmaurice, 9th Marquess of Lansdowne (b. 1941)
- Simon Henry George Petty-Fitzmaurice, Earl of Kerry (b. 1970)

== Bibliography ==
- Turner, Roger (1999). Capability Brown and the Eighteenth Century English Landscape, 2nd ed. Chichester: Phillimore.
