= Calstone Wellington =

Village and former parish in England

Coordinates: 51.414°N 1.965°W

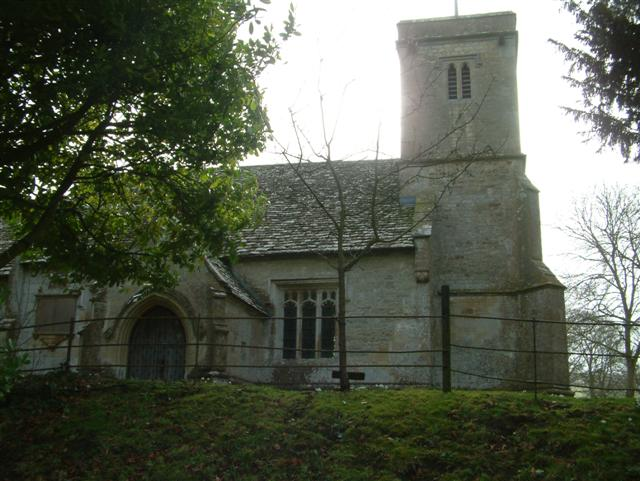
- Church of St. Mary, Calstone

- Location within Wiltshire
- OS grid reference: SU025684
- Civil parish: Cherhill
- Unitary authority: Wiltshire
- Ceremonial county: Wiltshire
- Region: South West
- Country: England
- Sovereign state: United Kingdom
- Post town: CALNE
- Postcode district: SN11
- Dialling code: 01249
- Police: Wiltshire
- Fire: Dorset and Wiltshire
- Ambulance: South Western
- UK Parliament: Chippenham
- Website: www.calstone.org

Calstone Wellington is a small village and former parish, now part of Cherhill parish, in Wiltshire, England. The village lies about 2.5 miles (4 km) south-east of Calne and has a 15th-century church.

== Geography ==
Anciently, there was a distinction between Calstone (which was a tithing of Calne parish and had no central settlement or church) and the small Calstone Wellington parish (which had a village and St Mary's church). In 1890, both were absorbed into the newly created Calne Without parish. Today, Calstone Wellington has two farms, the church and a few houses. The hamlet of Theobald's Green, which had been in the north of Calstone Wellington parish, remains a small settlement.

The southern boundary of Calstone Wellington was a Roman road. The eastern boundary followed a prehistoric ditch, while in the north the boundary with Cherhill passed through Oldbury Camp, the site of an Iron Age hillfort. In the west the boundary followed the minor road from Quemerford to Bishops Cannings.

The source of the River Marden is at Ranscombe Bottom near Calstone Wellington, and most of the land is chalk downland. The Calstone and Cherhill Downs is a biological SSSI, notified in 1971.

== Name ==
The name 'Calstone' may have developed from Calne east tun, meaning that the village was a rural extension of the neighbouring town of Calne. In about 1600, a small manor of Calstone was given the name of Calstone Wellington, in which 'Wellington' was the name of the lords of the manor in the 13th and 14th centuries.

== History ==
The Ridgeway, an ancient road dating from the Bronze Age, meets the early medieval Wansdyke near Calstone Wellington.

Calstone was probably part of the large royal estate of Calne which was held by the kings of England in the 10th century, and perhaps also before that. By the time of the Norman conquest of 1066, most of this royal estate had been granted away from the Crown as a series of smaller estates, including Calstone, Calstone Wylye, the future Calstone Wellington, and the future Blunt's. The Domesday survey in 1086 recorded three landholdings at Calestone, with altogether 62 households and four mills. The 'black land' of Calstone was held by the Crown until 1194, when it was granted to a new owner and became the manor and parish of Blackland.

What later became the manor of Calstone Wellington was held in 1086 by Estrild, who held it of Ernulf de Hesdin. The overlordship appears to have descended with the manor of Keevil in the Hesdin and FitzAlan families, and was held by Edmund of Woodstock, 1st Earl of Kent, when he died in 1330. Ralph de Wilington held the manor in 1228; the Wiltshire Victoria County History traces its later ownership in the Wilington family – including John de Wilington, 1st Baron Wilington (d. 1338) – and from 1396, by marriage, the Beaumonts and Bassets. In 1584 it was bought by Stephen Duckett (c.1548–1591), whose father Lionel had bought Calne manor and the adjacent Calstone manor in 1572.

Lionel Duckett was a wealthy London merchant who supported early voyages to Africa which paved the way for the slave trade in later centuries; he was Lord Mayor of London in 1572–1573. Stephen and seven other Duckett descendants were returned as MP for the rotten borough of Calne, the small number of electors being under the influence of the lord of the manor. Stephen's son John (1580–1648), MP and Royalist, lived at Calstone House until it was destroyed by fire during the Civil War. In 1763, Thomas Duckett sold a wide expanse of land – including Calstone, the former Calstone Wylye, and Calstone Wellington – to William Petty, 2nd Earl of Shelburne (from 1784 Marquess of Lansdowne and Viscount Calne and Calston). These lands remained part of the family's Bowood landholdings until the 20th century.

In 1377, Calstone had 79 poll-tax payers. By 1475, a fulling mill was operating in the village. It later became a corn mill. In 1716, Calstone Wellington parish contained only four families, and in 1841 the population was 28. Notes to the 1901 census state that the former parish had nine houses.

The house now called Calstone House began in the 17th century as a farmhouse which by 1728 was known as East Farm. It was remodelled in the 18th century and enlarged in the 19th, and the site ceased to be used as a farm in the late 20th century.

In the early 18th century, the Rev. George Millard founded a charity school at Calstone Wellington, supported by the SPCK and with places for six children, but due to the low population of the village vacant places sometimes had to be filled by poor children from Calne. In 1843, a cottage in the parish was still used as a school. A National School was in operation in 1846, attended by pupils from the surrounding area including Blackland, and in 1860 the school moved into a new building (with teacher's house) to the west of Manor Farm. Pupils of all ages attended, although by 1936 their number had fallen to 13. The school closed in 1962.

In the early 19th century, before enclosure, the arable fields of Calstone Wellington were scattered in the open fields of Calstone and Blackland. After enclosure, which took place in 1813, most of Calstone Wellington was a compact area of some 260 acres (1.1 km^{2}) around Manor Farm, but it also included other detached parts.

In 1827, a meeting house was certified for the use of Wesleyan Methodists, and in 1866 they built a chapel at Theobald's Green which remained in use until c.1960. In about 1882 a reservoir to supply water to Calne was created by damming the River Marden in the village.

In 1908, ploughing with oxen came to an end on Manor Farm. In 1958, heavy horses were still at work on the farm. The Marquesses of Lansdowne began to sell their farms in 1954, retaining Sprays Farm which in 2000 belonged to the 9th Marquess. The National Trust bought parcels of land in the 1980s and 1990s to add to their holdings around Cherhill Down.

== Governance ==
On 25 March 1835, as a result of the Poor Law Amendment Act 1834, the Calne Poor Law Union was formed, consisting of the parishes of Calne, Blackland, Bowood, Bremhill, Calstone Wellington, Cherhill, Compton Bassett, Heddington, Highway, Hilmarton, and Yatesbury. These parishes had had a population at the 1831 census of 8,973, of which Calstone Wellington's was the smallest. In 1883, there was a tidying up of parish boundaries, in which 7 acres (2.8 ha) of the parish were transferred to Cherhill, ten to Blackland, and other detached parts to Calne, while at the same time about 20 acres (8.1 ha) lying to the north-west of Calstone Village was transferred to Calstone Wellington from Calne and Blackland. In 1885, Calstone Wellington amounted to 284 acres (1.15 km^{2}).

In 1881 the parish had a population of 45. On 26 March 1890 the whole of Calstone and Blackland, including Calstone Wellington, became part of the new civil parish of Calne Without. Boundary changes which came into effect in May 2025 transferred this area to Cherhill parish.

== Church ==
By 1301 a church had been built at the village of Calstone, although what was to become Calstone Wellington remained for a time part of the ecclesiastical parish of Calne.

The present St Mary's parish church, which had that dedication by 1763, was rebuilt in the 15th century of stone rubble and ashlar and has a chancel, a nave, a north porch, a south vestry, and a west tower. The timber roofs of the nave and porch also date from the 15th century. A west gallery was built in the 18th century, and in 1884–1885 the church was carefully restored by Ewan Christian, when the vestry was added, the chancel was re-roofed, narrow windows in the nave and chancel were replaced by larger windows in a 15th-century style, and the gallery was removed. John Wordsworth, Bishop of Salisbury, led the reopening ceremony in late 1885.

The church had two bells in 1553. Another made by John Wallis in 1603 was the only bell in the tower until 1885, when two new bells cast by John Taylor & Co. of Loughborough were added. All were still in use in 2000. The parish registers now held in the Wiltshire and Swindon History Centre begin in 1760 and run up to 1963 for baptisms and burials, 1980 for marriages.

In 1881, the ecclesiastical parish – by then known as Calstone Wellington – was united with the benefice of Blackland. In 1962, it was moved into a new union with Heddington, and then in 1973, together with the parishes of Cherhill, Yatesbury, and Compton Bassett, it became part of a new benefice called Oldbury.

== Representation ==
Following the Great Reform Act, the parliamentary borough of Calne lost one of its two members of parliament and its boundaries were changed to bring in parts of Calstone Wellington and Blackland. Calne was abolished as a constituency with effect from the 1885 election, after which Calstone Wellington was included in the Chippenham county division.
