= Comerford =

Comerford, Commerford, Comberford or Quemerford is an Irish surname, of English origin. Notable people with the surname include:

== People ==
Comerford

- Andy Comerford (born 1972), Irish hurling manager and player
- Ann Comerford, Irish camogie player
- Bella Comerford (born 1977), British triathlete
- Charles Comerford (1894–1962), American football player
- Cristeta Comerford (born 1962), Filipino-American chef
- Eric Comerford (1912–1989), Australian footballer
- Evan Comerford (Dublin Gaelic footballer) (born 1998), Irish footballer
- Evan Comerford (Tipperary Gaelic footballer) (born 1994), Irish footballer
- Frank D. Comerford (1879–1929), American politician, judge, and author
- Gerald Comerford (c.1558–1604), Irish barrister, judge and statesman
- Jane Comerford (born 1959), Australian singer
- Jim Comerford (1913–2006), Australian trade unionist and writer
- John Comerford (1773–1832), Irish miniature painter
- Joseph Comerford (1958–2000), British engineer
- Maire Comerford (1892–1982), Irish republican
- Martin Comerford (born 1978), Irish sportsperson
- Nicholas Comerford (c. 1554–1599), Irish Jesuit priest
- Phelim Comerford, Irish rugby player
- Tim Comerford, American politician
- Tommy Comerford (1933–2003), British organized crime figure
- Tony Comerford (1898–1970), American football and basketball coach
- Vincent Comerford, Irish historian
- Frank Comerford Walker (1886–1959), American political figure

Commerford

- Kalindi Commerford (born 1994), Australian field hockey player
- Shaun Commerford (born 1981), Zimbabwean cricketer
- Thomas Commerford (1855–1920), American actor
- Thomas Commerford Martin (1856–1924), American electrical engineer and editor
- Tim Commerford (born 1968), American musician

== Locations ==
- Frank D. Comerford Airport, airport located in Walpole, New Hampshire, US
- Frank D. Comerford Dam, New Hampshire/Vermont border, US
- Comerford House, the original location for the Galway City Museum
- Comerford Reservoir, on the Connecticut River
- Comerford Theater, historic movie theater in Pennsylvania

== See also ==
- Quemerford, village in Wiltshire where the surname originated
