= Goatacre =

Village in Wiltshire, England

Coordinates: 51.491°N 1.973°W

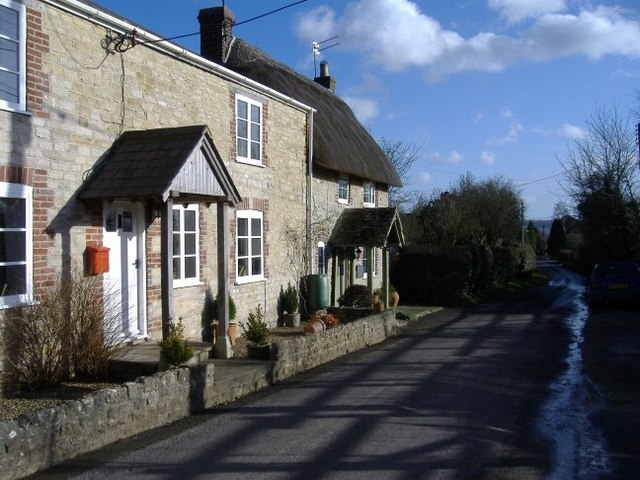
- A house in Goatacre

- Location within Wiltshire
- OS grid reference: SU020769
- Civil parish: Hilmarton
- Unitary authority: Wiltshire
- Ceremonial county: Wiltshire
- Region: South West
- Country: England
- Sovereign state: United Kingdom
- Post town: Calne
- Postcode district: SN11 9
- Dialling code: 01249
- Police: Wiltshire
- Fire: Dorset and Wiltshire
- Ambulance: South Western
- UK Parliament: Chippenham

Goatacre is a village in the English county of Wiltshire, about 4 miles (6 km) north of Calne and 1 mile (1.6 km) south of Lyneham on the A3102 road. It is in the parish of Hilmarton and the closest major town is Swindon, some 12 miles (19 km) to the northeast. The hamlet of New Zealand is nearby, to the northwest.

== History ==
The first recorded reference to "Godacre" occurs in 1242. The name occurs in 1348 as Gatacre and in 1408 as Gotagre, and is derived from the Old English word gat-aecre meaning, literally, goat-acre.

The land was generally part of the Hilmarton estate, and was acquired by the Poynder family, owners at Hilmarton, in the mid 19th century. The Poynders built or rebuilt several buildings, including the farmhouse (in the centre of the village) and Corton House (to the west).

The village has no Church of England presence, the nearest church being St Laurence at Hilmarton, one mile to the south. Quakers were active from the 17th century, and had a burial ground to the east of the village from 1678. A small Primitive Methodist chapel was erected on the site of the burial ground in 1876, and replaced in 1909 by a larger red brick building by the main road, at the turning for New Zealand; this remained in use until 1994 and is now a private house. An independent, later Congregational, chapel was built in the village c. 1824 and closed in 1917.

== Amenities ==
Goatacre has a cricket club, founded in 1928; their team won the Cricketer National Village Knockout competition in 1988 and 1990, and in 2017 won promotion to the Premier One division of the West of England Premier League, the region's top tier of recreational cricket.

The village hall was extended in 2013 and is home to Goatacre Cricket Club and Goatacre Sports and Social Club. There are also facilities for playing football, including a pitch and changing facilities shared with the cricket club.
