= Cherhill =

Village and civil parish in Wiltshire, England

Coordinates: 51.430°N 1.947°W

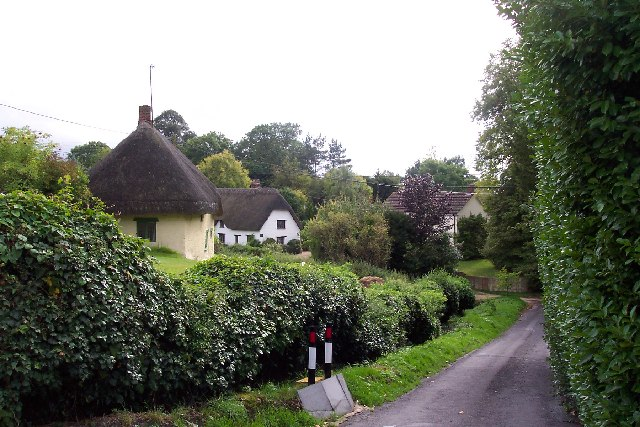
- The Street, Cherhill

- Location within Wiltshire
- Population: 727 (in 2011)
- OS grid reference: SU038701
- Civil parish: Cherhill
- Unitary authority: Wiltshire
- Ceremonial county: Wiltshire
- Region: South West
- Country: England
- Sovereign state: United Kingdom
- Post town: Calne
- Postcode district: SN11
- Dialling code: 01249
- Police: Wiltshire
- Fire: Dorset and Wiltshire
- Ambulance: South Western
- UK Parliament: Chippenham
- Website: cherhill.org

Cherhill is a village and civil parish in Wiltshire, England. The village is about 2 1/2 miles (4 km) east of the town of Calne, on the A4 road towards Marlborough. The parish includes the village of Yatesbury and the hamlets of Blackland, Theobald's Green, Calstone Wellington and Calstone.

Cherhill has a population of around 700 with a mixture of housing ranging from thatched cottages (some dating from the 14th century) to newly built detached houses. The River's Brook rises in the northeast of the village and flows west towards Quemerford, where it joins the River Marden.

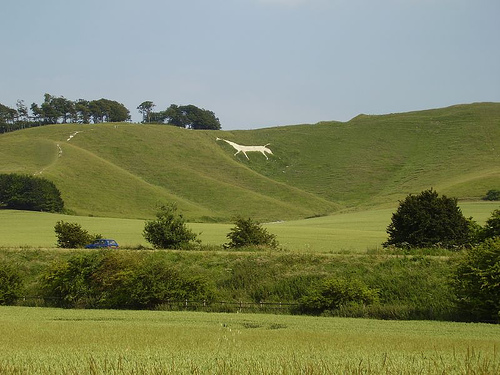
Cherhill White Horse, seen from the village

Cherhill is located in the western foothills of the North Wessex Downs National Landscape. Cherhill Down, a hill to the southeast of the village, is known for the Cherhill White Horse cut into the chalk hillside in 1780, the Lansdowne Monument obelisk, and the crop circles that appeared in the fields at the bottom of the hill. The area around the horse and obelisk is owned by the National Trust. On a clear day, the 840 ft (260 m) summit offers fine views, up to 25 miles, with the water tower at Tetbury in Gloucestershire visible. Atop the tall hill to the north of the village, opposite to Cherhill Downs, it is said to be possible to see the Severn crossings to South Wales, 38 miles (61 km) to the west.

== Location ==
Cherhill lies on an old coaching road, now the A4, which runs from central London to Bristol. Its nearest railway station is Chippenham on the Great Western Main Line, which is a stop for services between London Paddington and Bristol Temple Meads. The nearest motorway junction is junction 17 of the M4 north of Chippenham, 15 miles (24 km) from Cherhill. The village is served by the Wigglybus scheme, which runs from Cherhill and other surrounding villages into nearby Calne and connects to further transport links.

== History ==
John Marius Wilson's Imperial Gazetteer of England and Wales (1870–1872) says of Cherhill:

CHERHILL, a parish in Calne district, Wilts; near Wans Dyke, 2½ miles E by S of Calne r. station, and 7 NNE of Devizes. It has a post office under Chippenham. Acres, 1, 817. Real property, £2, 574. Pop., 364. Houses, 88. The property is all in one estate. An ancient square camp with double works, called Oldbury, is on the summit of a chalk hill; and the figure of a horse, 157 feet long, cut out of the turf about 1780, and visible for many miles, is on the side of the same hill. The living is a rectory in the diocese of Salisbury. Value, £300. Patron, the Bishop of Salisbury. The church is old but very good; and there is a Primitive Methodist chapel.

The Lansdowne Monument, or Cherhill Monument, is a 125-foot stone obelisk erected in 1845 by the Third Marquis of Lansdowne on Cherhill Down in honour of his ancestor Sir William Petty.

The civil parish increased in size in 1934, when Cherhill gained some land from Calne Without and absorbed the whole of Yatesbury parish. There was a further increase in 2025 when a large rural area south of the A4 was transferred from Calne Without, including the hamlets of Blackland, Theobald's Green, Calstone Wellington and Calstone.

=== Cherhill Downs, White Horse and Oldbury hillfort ===
Near the top of Cherhill Down stands Oldbury Camp or Oldbury Castle (not to be confused with sites having similar names in Somerset and Kent), which began as a Bronze Age enclosure and was enlarged in the Iron Age to become a hillfort.

The Cherhill White Horse was cut out of the hillside in 1780. It has been restored several times due to chalk being washed away and weeds growing on it. The horse is visible from miles around and has become a landmark synonymous with the village and local area.

From here it is possible to see the route of a Roman road heading toward the nearby Wansdyke trade route. The top of the hill is popular with ramblers, dog walkers and power kiters, owing to the powerful winds in action.

=== The Cherhill Gang ===
The Cherhill Gang was a notorious group of highway men who operated in the 18th century on the London to Bath main road (A4) which passes through the village – they were noted for their robbery technique of attacking the carriages of rich Londoners while completely naked, thus shocking passengers into handing over their money and also making it harder to identify them. A painting depicting one such attack can be seen in the Black Horse pub, on the A4 main road in the village.

=== Sundial ===
At one of the village's bus shelters is a millennium project of a sundial. Consisting of a vertical sarsen stone inside a face of Roman numerals, it symbolises the passage of time.

== Parish church ==
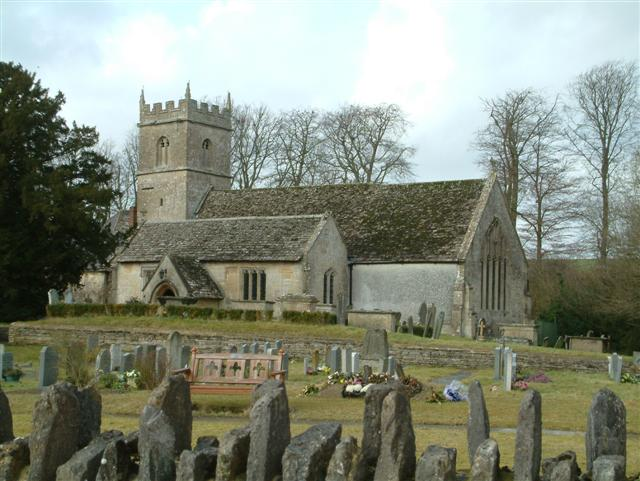
St James' Church

The Church of England parish church of St James has 12th-century origins. Most of the building, including the tower, is from the 15th century. A west gallery in Gothic style was added in 1840, and restoration in 1863 was by S.B. Gabriel. The church was designated as Grade II* listed in 1960.

Cherhill was a dependent church of St Mary's, Calne until 1842. The ecclesiastical parish was enlarged in 1879 when 204 acres were transferred from Calne. Since 1973 the parish has been part of the Oldbury Benefice.

== Governance ==
The Parish Council has a mostly consultative role, while the Wiltshire Council unitary authority is responsible for all significant local government functions. The parish forms part of the Chippenham parliamentary constituency.

== Amenities ==
Cherhill has a primary school, built at Middle Lane in 1961 to replace a small school on The Street which was built in 1846 or 1847.

The village hall was built in 1977, next to the old school. In 2015 a new building was proposed, on a larger site immediately east of the village boundary.

Cherhill Cricket Club play in the Wiltshire League. The village has a pub, the Black Horse.

== Bibliography ==
- Plenderleath, Rev. W. C., On the White Horses of Wiltshire and Its Neighbourhood (Wilts Archaeological Magazine, vol. 14 for the year 1872, pp. 12–30)
- Plenderleath, Rev. W. C., White Horses of the West of England (London, Allen & Storr, 1892)
- Plenderleath, Rev. W. C., Plenderleath's Memoranda of Cherhill (2001)
