= Calstone =

Former tithing and manor in Wiltshire, England

Coordinates: 51.421°N 1.970°W

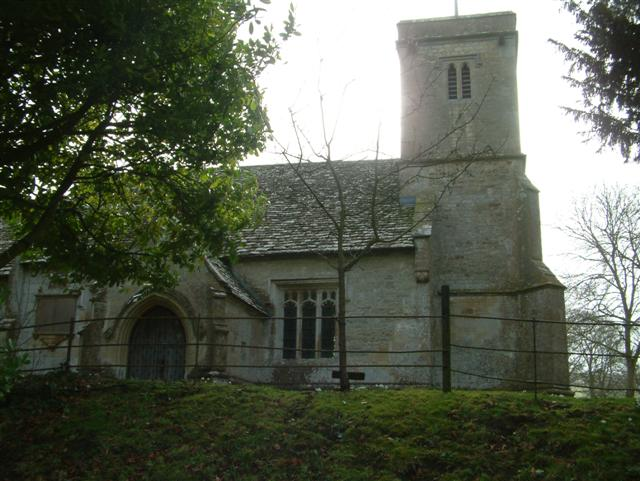
- Church of St. Mary, Calstone

- Location within Wiltshire
- OS grid reference: SU022691
- Civil parish: Cherhill
- Unitary authority: Wiltshire
- Ceremonial county: Wiltshire
- Region: South West
- Country: England
- Sovereign state: United Kingdom
- Post town: Calne
- Postcode district: SN11
- Dialling code: 01249
- Police: Wiltshire
- Fire: Dorset and Wiltshire
- Ambulance: South Western
- UK Parliament: Chippenham
- Website: www.calstone.org

Calstone is a former tithing and manor in Wiltshire, England, lying southeast of Calne and adjacent to Calstone Wellington, in the civil parish of Cherhill.

The area was almost certainly part of the large Calne estate held by the king in the 10th century or earlier. By 1066, three estates had been granted away: one which became Calstone manor, another which became Calstone Wellington manor, and a third which was later called Blunt's. The Domesday survey in 1086 recorded three landholdings at Calestone, with altogether 62 households and four mills. The remainder, later called the 'black land' of Calstone, was kept by the Crown until 1194 when it was granted to a new owner and became the manor and parish of Blackland.

Calstone village was divided between Calne and Calstone Wellington parishes. A church had been built at Calstone by 1301, presumably on the Blunt's estate; from 1600 the ecclesiastical parish was called Calstone Wellington, and the village later took this name also. Since at least 1889, the name Calstone has not been used for the settlement on Ordnance Survey maps.

The Wiltshire Victoria County History lists the landowners, including the Barons Zouche from the early 14th century to the 1550s, and from 1572 Sir Lionel Duckett (1511–1587). He was a wealthy London merchant, Lord Mayor of London in 1572–1573, who supported early voyages to Africa which paved the way for the slave trade in later centuries. His son Stephen and seven other Duckett descendants were returned as MP for the rotten borough of Calne, the small number of electors being under the influence of the lord of the manor. In 1763, Thomas Duckett sold much land, including Calstone, to William Petty, 2nd Earl of Shelburne (from 1784 Marquess of Lansdowne and Viscount Calne and Calston). These lands remained part of the family's Bowood landholdings until 1954, when the Marquesses began to sell off farms, while retaining some property in the area.

An estate later called Calstone Wylye was detached from Calstone manor in the 12th century, and reunited with Calstone when it was bought by Stephen Duckett in 1585.

In the 19th century, Calstone Wellington was recognised as a civil parish, while Calstone remained a tithing of Calne. In 1890, both Calstone Wellington and Calstone were absorbed into the newly created Calne Without parish. Boundary changes which came into effect in May 2025 transferred this area to Cherhill parish.

For the history of the church and its parish, see Calstone Wellington.
