= New Zealand, Wiltshire =

Hamlet in Wiltshire, England

Coordinates: 51.497°N 1.984°W

New Zealand
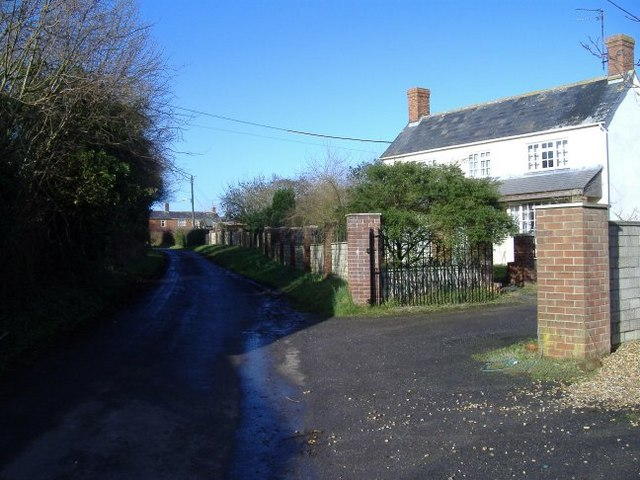
- New Zealand

- Location within Wiltshire
- OS grid reference: SU012776
- Civil parish: Hilmarton
- Unitary authority: Wiltshire
- Ceremonial county: Wiltshire
- Region: South West
- Country: England
- Sovereign state: United Kingdom
- Post town: Calne
- Postcode district: SN11 9
- Police: Wiltshire
- Fire: Dorset and Wiltshire
- Ambulance: South Western
- UK Parliament: Chippenham

New Zealand is a hamlet in the civil parish of Hilmarton in Wiltshire, England. Nearby villages are Goatacre, Hilmarton and Lyneham; the nearest town is Calne, approximately 4 miles (6 km) to the southwest.

Today the hamlet is close to the southern boundary of MoD Lyneham, which was opened as RAF Lyneham in 1940.
