= Calstone and Cherhill Downs =

Protected area in Wiltshire, England

Coordinates: 51.42179°N 1.93380°W

Calstone and Cherhill Downs (grid reference SU047692) is a 128.6 hectare biological Site of Special Scientific Interest in Wiltshire, notified in 1971, including downland at Calstone Wellington and Cherhill. It provides one of the best examples in Wiltshire of unimproved downland.

The site forms part of the North Wessex Downs Area of Outstanding Natural Beauty. The site lies towards the western edge of the Marlborough Downs, has a narrow plateau of the Middle and Upper Chalk and descends steeply to the north and more gently to the south. The south-facing slope has a complex structure of narrow, steep-sided dry valleys and coombes and has a mixture of grasses, sedges and forbs. Here grow a typical calcareous community including glaucus sedge, sheep’s-fescue, meadow oat-grass, heath-grass and common quaking-grass, together with cowslip, salad burnet, rock-rose, betony, field fleawort, bastard-toadflax, round-headed rampion, small scabious, devil’s-bit scabious, horseshoe vetch, kidney vetch and chalk milkwort. Orchids found here include, early purple orchid, burnt orchid, fragrant orchid, bee orchid and frog orchid, the last three all being common here.

The site is also excellent for invertebrates, hosting the small blue, chalkhill blue, Duke of Burgundy and marsh fritillary, as well as the rare wart-biter bush cricket and the uncommon bug Sehirus dubius The lime-loving heath snail Helicella itala is also found here. There is a dewpond that holds water all year round; newts are found here as well as the Emperor dragonfly and the azure damselfly Coenagrion puella.
