= Carol Gould =

Carol Gould may refer to:

- Carol Gould (writer) (1953–2021), American writer and broadcaster based in the United Kingdom
- Carol Gould (athlete) (born 1944), retired long-distance runner from England
- Carol C. Gould, Hunter College and CUNY Graduate Center
- Carole Gould, British domestic violence law campaigner
