= Hilmarton =

Village in Wiltshire, England

Coordinates: 51.476°N 1.972°W

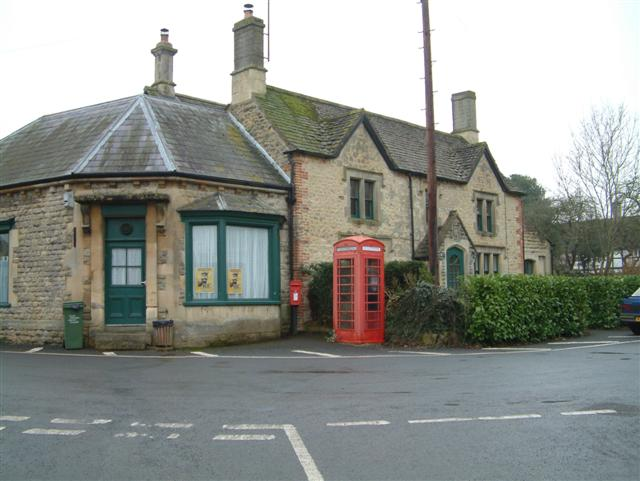
- Former Post Office, Hilmarton

- Location within Wiltshire
- Population: 746 (in 2011)
- OS grid reference: SU020752
- Civil parish: Hilmarton
- Unitary authority: Wiltshire
- Ceremonial county: Wiltshire
- Region: South West
- Country: England
- Sovereign state: United Kingdom
- Post town: Calne
- Postcode district: SN11
- Dialling code: 01249
- Police: Wiltshire
- Fire: Dorset and Wiltshire
- Ambulance: South Western
- UK Parliament: Chippenham
- Website: www.hilmartonparish.co.uk

Hilmarton is a village and civil parish in North Wiltshire, in the west of England. The village lies on the A3102 between the towns of Calne and Wootton Bassett, and 2 miles (3.2 km) south of Lyneham. The parish includes the village of Goatacre and the hamlets of Catcomb, Clevancy, Highway and New Zealand.

Cowage Brook, a tributary of the River Marden, crosses the parish in a southwesterly direction and forms part of its western boundary.

== History ==
There is evidence of Roman presence within the parish, including a Romano-British well at Corton, in the northeast. A settlement of 21 households was recorded at Helmertone in the Domesday Book of 1086.

By the 14th century there were a number of scattered hamlets, with Hilmarton and Goatacre the largest. Others assessed for taxation in 1334 were Clevancy, Corton, Witcomb, Littlecott and Beversbrook; by the 20th century these five had few buildings other than farms. The ground-level remains of the medieval settlement at Littlecott are a Scheduled Ancient Monument.

The manor was bought in 1813 by Thomas Poynder, and on his death in 1856 passed to his sons: Thomas Henry Allen (died 1873) and then William Henry (died 1880). The elder Thomas enlarged the estate, purchasing farms as they became available, including Catcomb, Goatacre, Lower Littlecott, Beversbrook and Cowage. By 1880 the estate extended to some 3,500 acres (1,400 ha). The Poynders built or rebuilt several farmhouses, cottages for estate workers, a school and almshouses; in most cases the architect was Henry Weaver. Thomas H.A. Poynder also bought the Hartham Park estate, some 10 miles (16 km) to the east near Corsham.

On William Poynder's death in 1880, the estate passed to his nephew John Poynder Dickson, army officer, later Member of Parliament, Baron Islington, and Governor of New Zealand 1910–1912. By royal licence he took the surname Dickson-Poynder in 1888; he lived at Hartham. Dickson-Poynder divided and sold the Hilmarton estate in 1914, when several of the farms were bought by their tenants.

Cowage Farm in the west of the parish was transferred from Compton Bassett parish in 1883, and in 1890 Hilmarton absorbed the small parish of Highway, to the south.

=== Poynder buildings ===
Buildings erected or remodelled by the Poynder family include the following, all now Grade II listed.

Hilmarton Manor, formerly Hilmarton Lodge, near the Calne road about half a mile south of the village. Mid 19th century, two storeys in Tudor cottage style. Built as a shooting lodge then enlarged; rear wing added c. 1910. The house was sold after the death of Lord Poynder in 1936. Since the Manor has had a number of owners. In 2000 the French Laerriere family ran the Hilmarton Manor Press from the site. Later in 2011 the manor was sold and new owners completed a number of restorations to the building. As of August 2017 it was sold again to the Harris Family.

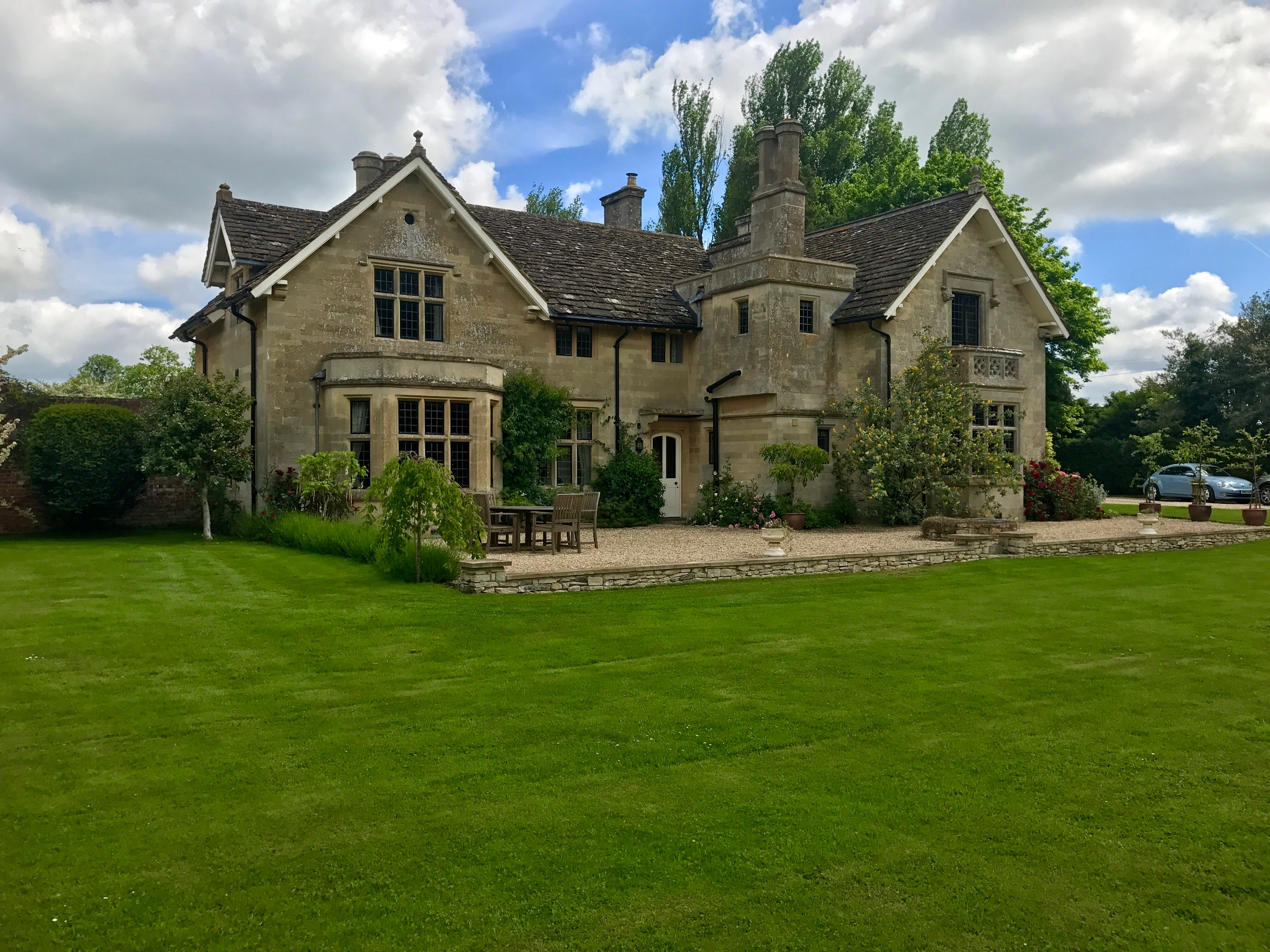
Hilmarton Manor, front view, June 2017

Manor Farmhouse, south of the church, is a 17th-century timber-frame building, with a large east wing added c. 1860 for the Poynder estate.

School, c. 1860, east of the church. Two parallel ranges with their gables to the street; thin octagonal tower with open bell-stage.

Row of five single-storey almshouses, 1877, near the school. Built and endowed by William Poynder to provide for elderly estate workers.

Well house, Compton Road, c. 1900. Six timber posts carrying conical roof of stone slates.

== Religious sites ==
=== Parish church ===
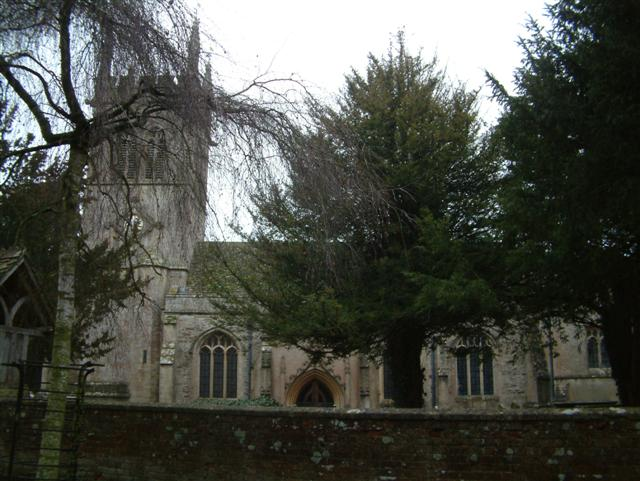
Parish Church

The church at Hilmarton is first mentioned in 1291. The north arcade of the parish church of St Laurence has four bays which survive from the late 12th century. 15th-century work is evident in the nave roof and the fine stone screen. Much of the tower was rebuilt in 1840, and the churchyard gate is of similar date. General restoration in 1879–81 at the expense of William Poynder and superintended by G.E. Street included the building of the organ chamber, and stained glass by Clayton and Bell. The wooden screen in the tower arch is by C.E. Ponting, 1896.

A war memorial window of 1920, on the north side, is by Morris & Co. A Lady Chapel was added in the 1950s, and has the altar from St Peter's at Highway. The church was designated as Grade I listed in 1960. The tower has six bells, ranging in date from the 15th century to 1874. Today St Laurence's is part of the Woodhill benefice, a group of four parishes.

A rare 1611 edition of the King James Bible was rediscovered in the church in 2011; it is no longer kept there.

=== Others ===
St Peter's church at Highway was a chapelry of Bremhill. In 1866-7 the 12th-century church was almost entirely rebuilt to designs of William Butterfield. Highway was transferred to Hilmarton parish in 1952, the name of the benefice becoming 'Hilmarton and Highway'. The church was confirmed as redundant in 1971 and became a private dwelling.

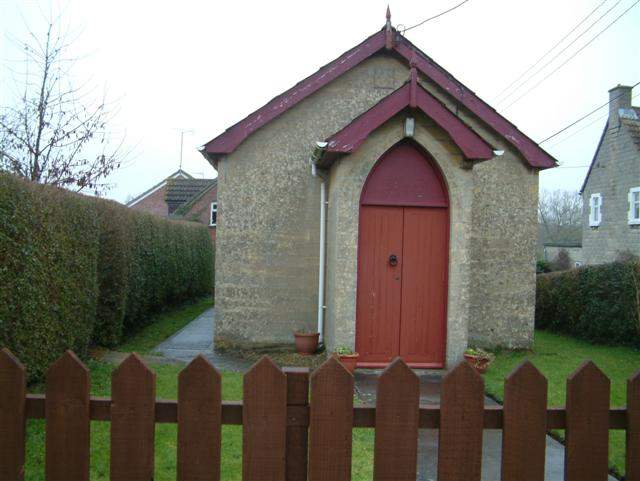
Hilmarton Chapel

A small Baptist chapel was built in Church Road in 1924, replacing a Strict Baptist chapel of 1848 elsewhere in the village. It continues in use as an independent chapel, affiliated to the Fellowship of Independent Evangelical Churches.

At Goatacre, a small Primitive Methodist chapel was erected on the site of a Quaker burial ground in 1876, and replaced in 1909 by a larger red brick building near the main road, which remained in use until 1994 and is now a private house. A small corrugated iron chapel at Clevancy was built by Independents in 1881 and used by Baptists for much of the 20th century.

== Amenities ==
The village school continues as Hilmarton Primary School, its buildings having been extended in 2002; there were 107 children attending in 2011.

In 2018 the pub (The Duke Hotel) in Hilmarton was sold by the Arkells brewery and closed for a while. It reopened in August 2021 following alterations and the lifting of COVID-19 restrictions. The pub was built in the 1850s and has a former brewery building of c. 1860.
