= Oldbury =

Oldbury may refer to:

== People ==
- Oldbury (surname)

== Places ==
- Oldbury, Shropshire, a village near Bridgnorth, England
- Oldbury-on-Severn, a village in Gloucestershire, England
  - Oldbury nuclear power station, under decommissioning since 2012
- Oldbury-on-the-Hill, a village and former civil parish in Gloucestershire, England
- Oldbury, Warwickshire, a hamlet in Hartshill parish, Warwickshire, England
- Oldbury, West Midlands, a town in the Metropolitan Borough of Sandwell, England
  - Oldbury Railway, a former branch line
  - Oldbury railway station
  - Oldbury United F.C.
- Oldbury, Western Australia, a district south of Perth, Australia
- Oldbury Naite, a village in South Gloucestershire, England

== Other uses ==
- Oldbury Court Estate, a park in Bristol
- Oldbury Hillfort, an Iron Age hillfort on Cherhill Downs, Wiltshire
- Oldbury Camp, an Iron Age hillfort near Ightham, Kent
  - Oldbury rock shelters, Palaeolithic rock shelters
- Oldberry Castle, sometimes called Oldbury Castle, an Iron Age hillfort in Somerset
