= Highway, Wiltshire =

Hamlet in Wiltshire, England

Coordinates: 51.469°N 1.940°W

Highway
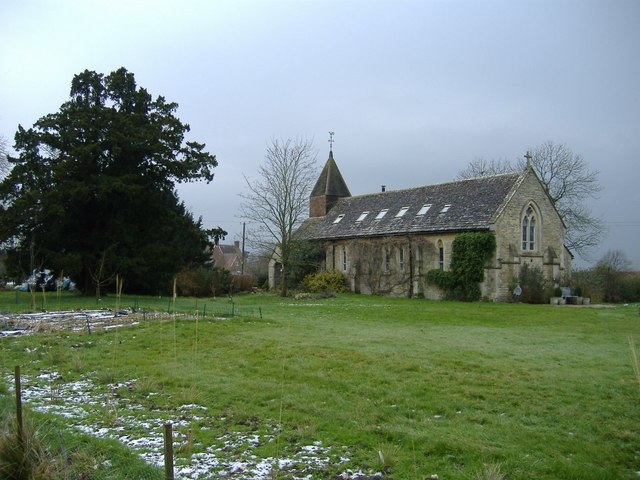
- Former Church of St Peter, Highway

- Location within Wiltshire
- OS grid reference: SU043745
- Civil parish: Hilmarton
- Unitary authority: Wiltshire
- Ceremonial county: Wiltshire
- Region: South West
- Country: England
- Sovereign state: United Kingdom
- Post town: Calne
- Postcode district: SN11
- Dialling code: 01249
- Police: Wiltshire
- Fire: Dorset and Wiltshire
- Ambulance: South Western
- UK Parliament: Chippenham

Highway is a hamlet and former civil parish, now in the parish of Hilmarton, in Wiltshire, England. The hamlet lies about 1 1/2 miles (2.4 km) southeast of Hilmarton village and 3 1/2 miles (6 km) northeast of the town of Calne.

== History ==
A settlement of 15 households was recorded in the Domesday Book of 1086, and at this time most of the land was held by Malmesbury Abbey. In 1219 the manor (together with Bremhill and Foxham) was transferred to the Bishop of Salisbury, and by this time Highway was probably a chapelry of Bremhill, northwest of Calne. In 1881 the civil parish had a population of 88.

The manor passed through various hands, including (from 1628) Sir John Glanville of Broad Hinton, a member of parliament who served as Speaker and as King's Serjeant. In 1936 the estate was inherited by Raymond Anthony Addington, 6th Viscount Sidmouth, and continues today as the family seat.

Highway was a large village, with a population of 148 recorded at the 1831 census. The village declined as Calne grew, with most inhabitants having left by the early 20th century. Today Highway is a hamlet consisting of the manor house, a farm, the former church and a small number of houses.

The only listed building is Stratton Cottage, formerly two cottages and now a house, which dates from the 17th century.

== Church ==
Highway was a chapelry of St Martin's, Bremhill. St Peter's church was a 12th-century building but was too small for the 19th-century population, and was almost entirely rebuilt in 1866–67 to designs of William Butterfield at the expense of Archdeacon Harris, vicar of Bremhill. The new building had a simple rectangular plan with a south porch and was constructed in stone with a roof of stone slates; the western bell-turret was in timber and roofed in shingles.

Highway was transferred to Hilmarton parish in 1952, the name of the benefice becoming 'Hilmarton and Highway'. The church was confirmed as redundant in 1971 and became a private dwelling, described by Pevsner in 1975 as "recently converted".

== Local government ==
The parish of Highway was a detached part of Potterne and Cannings hundred, surrounded by Kingsbridge hundred. On 26 March 1890 the parish was abolished and merged with Hilmarton.
