= Calne Town Hall =

Municipal building in Calne, Wiltshire, England

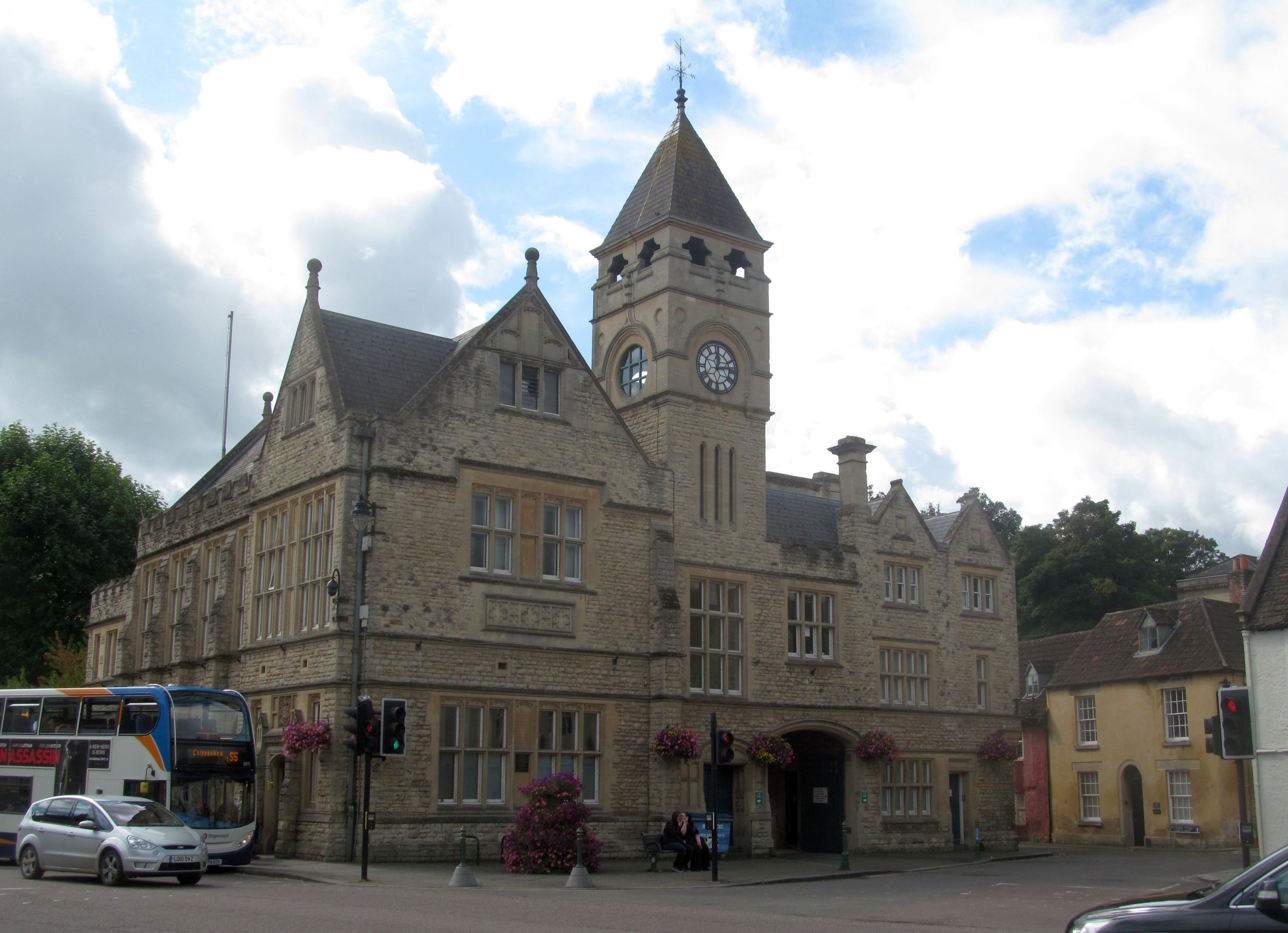
- Calne Town Hall

- Shown in Wiltshire
- 51.4377°N 2.0052°W
- Location: The Strand, Calne

History
- Built: 1886

Site notes
- Architect: Bryan Oliver
- Architectural style: Gothic style

Listed Building – Grade II
- Official name: Town Hall
- Designated: 8 July 1976
- Reference no.: 1270827

Calne Town Hall is a municipal building in The Strand, Calne, Wiltshire, England. The town hall, which is the meeting place of Calne Town Council, is a grade II listed building.

== History ==
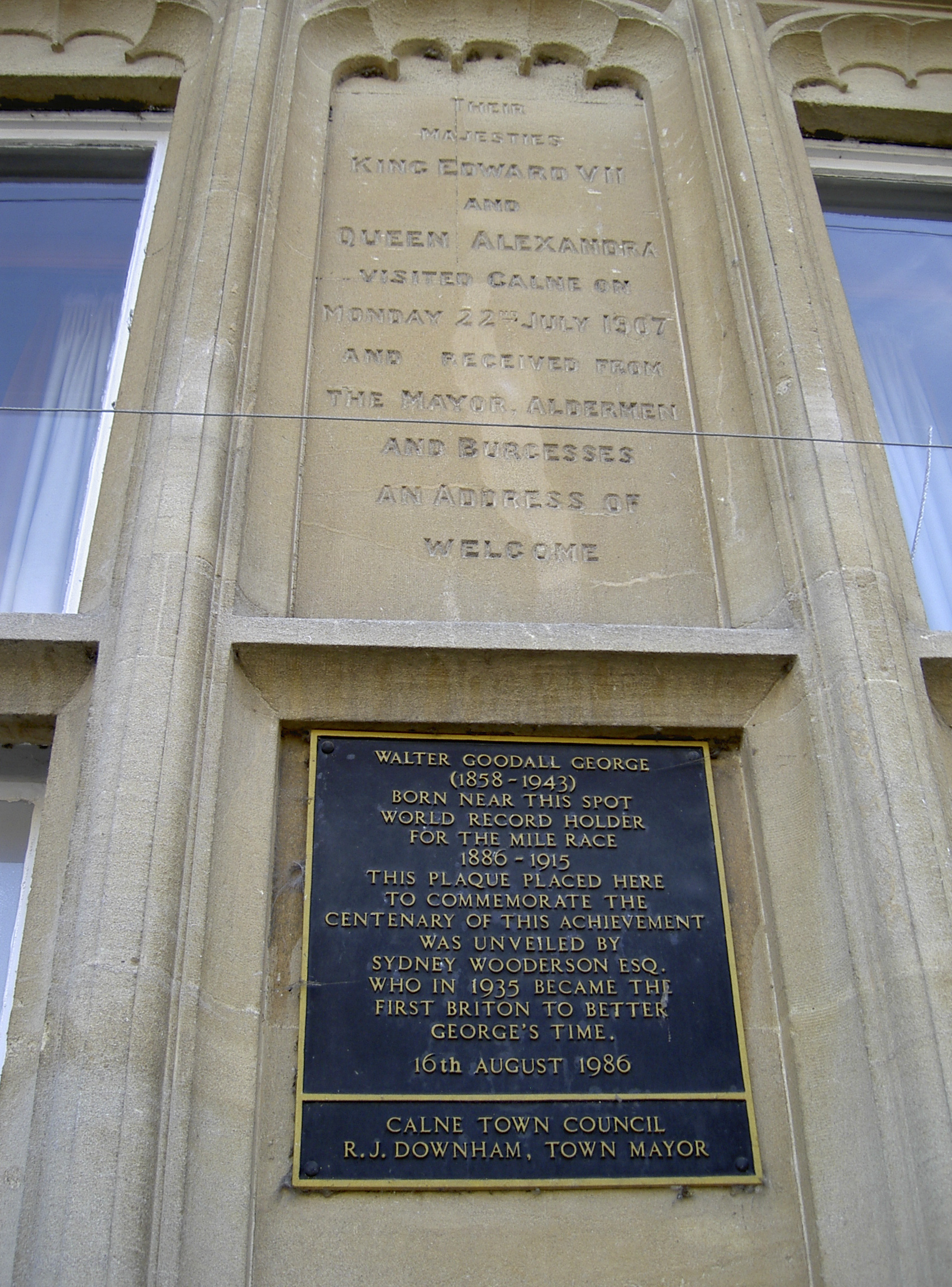
Plaque recording the world record set by local athlete Walter Goodall George

The first town hall in Calne was established in 1829 when a corn store on Market Hill was converted to form a market house with a meeting room on the first floor for civic leaders. The room became the office of the new borough council when the area was designated a municipal borough in 1835. In the early 1880s civic leaders decided to demolish the old market house and to create a dedicated town hall: the site selected in The Strand had been occupied by the old town mill.

The new building, which was designed by Bryan Oliver in the Gothic style, was built in limestone rubble and was opened in 1886. The design involved an asymmetrical main frontage with five bays facing onto Cox's Hill; the left-hand bay featured a pair of three-light windows on the ground floor, a carved panel and pair of two-light windows on the first floor and a large gable containing a small three-light window above. The second bay featured a doorway on the ground floor, a nine-light window on the first floor and a clock tower (containing a quarter-chiming clock by John Smith of Derby) with a pyramid-shaped roof above. The third bay featured a carriageway with a three-light window above, while the two right-hand bays featured a combination of four-light and three-light windows with two smaller gables above. Internally, the principal rooms were a panelled council chamber on the left-hand side of the building, a public hall (subsequently referred to as the "Large Hall ") at the rear of the building and a corn exchange. The public hall was also used as a courthouse from an early stage.

King Edward VII and Queen Alexandra visited the town and received an address from civic leaders in front of the town hall on 22 July 1907. A small building behind the town hall was home to the fire service until 1966 when it moved to Wenhill Heights. The building continued to serve as the headquarters of the Calne Borough Council for much of the 20th century but ceased to be the local seat of government after the enlarged North Wiltshire Council was formed in 1974. The town hall subsequently became the meeting place of Calne Town Council.

In August 1986, a plaque was unveiled by the athlete, Sydney Wooderson, on the town hall to commemorate the achievement of the local athlete, Walter Goodall George, who had broken the world mile record in 1886. The Prince of Wales called in at the town hall on his way to visit an environmental project at a local farm on 25 March 1988 and Queen Elizabeth II entered the building and signed the visitors' book on 7 December 2001.

== Sources ==
- A Guide to Calne Town Hall (PDF). Calne Town Council.
