= Yatesbury =

Village in Wiltshire, England

Coordinates: 51.444°N 1.906°W

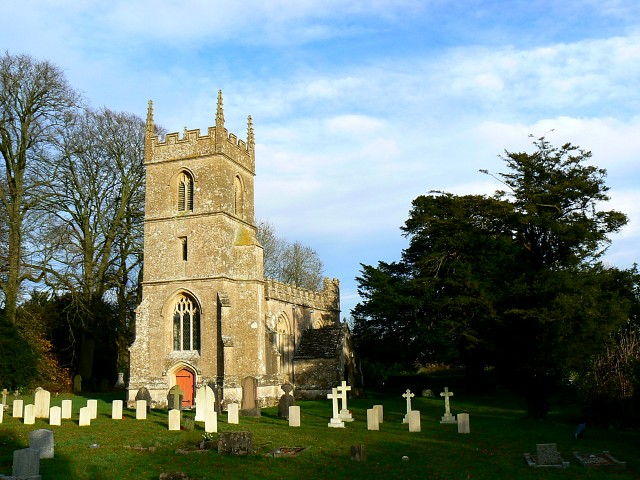
- Church of All Saints, Yatesbury

- Location within Wiltshire
- OS grid reference: SU066716
- Civil parish: Cherhill
- Unitary authority: Wiltshire
- Ceremonial county: Wiltshire
- Region: South West
- Country: England
- Sovereign state: United Kingdom
- Post town: Calne
- Postcode district: SN11
- Dialling code: 01249
- Police: Wiltshire
- Fire: Dorset and Wiltshire
- Ambulance: South Western
- UK Parliament: Chippenham

Yatesbury is a small village and former civil parish, now in the parish of Cherhill, in Wiltshire, England. It is in the northeast of Cherhill parish, 1 mile (1.6 km) north of the A4 road approximately 4 miles (6 km) east of Calne and 9 miles (14 km) west of Marlborough.

Yatesbury was an ancient parish and in the 19th century became a civil parish, which was absorbed by Cherhill parish on 1 April 1934. In 1931 the parish had a population of 140. Yatesbury today has a population of about 150. Whilst having no shops or amenities, the village is on National Cycle Route 403. It is noted for RAF Yatesbury, which was an important training centre during World War II.

== Landmarks ==
The Church of England parish church of All Saints has 12th-century origins, and 13th-century work can be seen inside; the nave roof and tower are 15th-century. There is a canonical sundial on the south wall. The chancel was rebuilt in 1854 by C.H. Gabriel, and the church was designated as Grade I listed in 1960.

Since 1973 the parish has been part of the Oldbury Benefice, which comprises the five parishes of Calstone Wellington, Cherhill, Compton Bassett, Heddington and Yatesbury.

The nearest primary school is at Cherhill. Yatesbury had its own small school from 1856 to 1963; after the school closed the building became the village hall.

The Granary at Manor Farm, Yatesbury, was restored by the Wiltshire Historic Buildings Trust in 2006–2007.

== RAF Yatesbury ==
Opened as a Royal Flying Corps training site in 1916, the station closed three years later and returned to farmland. Pilot training resumed in 1936, then from 1939 the site was used to train many airborne wireless operators and, from 1942, radar operators. Training of radar operators, mechanics and fitters continued until 1965; in 1969 the wooden huts were demolished and the land returned again to farming, leaving several brick-built buildings and hangars.

== Notable people ==
The singer, songwriter and author Julian Cope has lived in the village for many years. He referenced the village in the song My Wall in which he collaborated with the American drone metal band Sunn 0))), as well as in his 2013 publication, Copendium.

== Popular culture ==
The music video for Doctorin' the Tardis was filmed in the Yatesbury area.
