= Blackland, Wiltshire =

Hamlet in Calne Without, Wiltshire

Coordinates: 51.416°N 1.985°W

Blackland
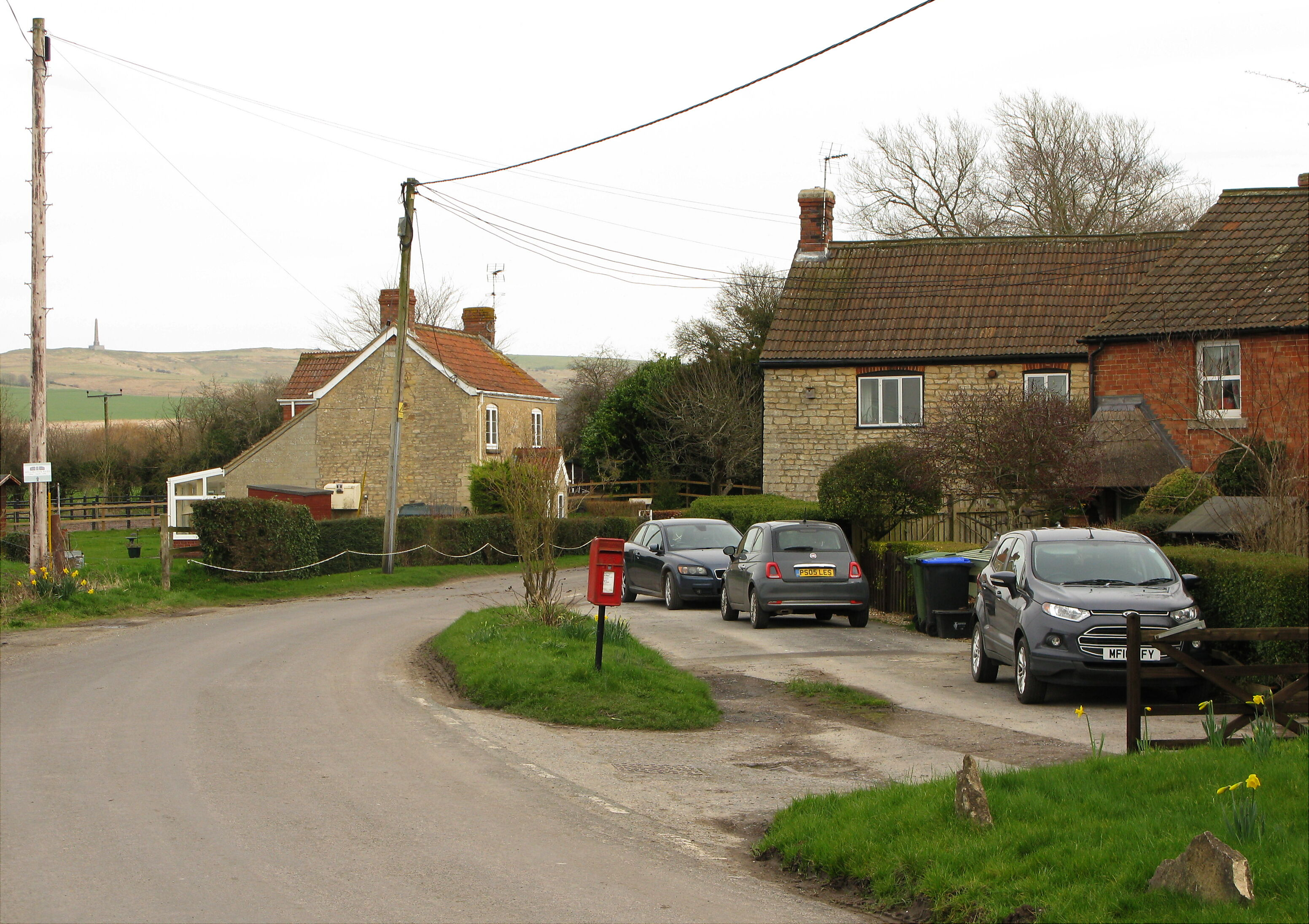
- Hamlet at Blacklands crossroads

- Location within Wiltshire
- OS grid reference: SU012686
- Civil parish: Cherhill
- Unitary authority: Wiltshire
- Ceremonial county: Wiltshire
- Region: South West
- Country: England
- Sovereign state: United Kingdom
- Post town: CALNE
- Postcode district: SN11
- Dialling code: 01249
- Police: Wiltshire
- Fire: Dorset and Wiltshire
- Ambulance: South Western
- UK Parliament: Melksham and Devizes

Blackland (sometimes Blacklands) is a hamlet and former civil parish, now in Cherhill parish, just south-east of the town of Calne, in Wiltshire, England. There is a 13th-century church and an 18th-century country house, Blackland House. In 1881 the parish had a population of 50.

== Geography ==
The former parish is south of the A4 road towards Marlborough, opposite Quemerford, an outlying area of Calne. The road was at one time the main route from London to Bath. The hamlet is about 1.9 miles (3 km) from the centre of Calne, dispersed around a crossroads; one minor road leads east to Calstone Wellington, another south over higher ground to Bishops Cannings and Devizes. The older settlement, now only the church, grand house and farm, lies further north.

The River Marden flows north-westwards across the area.

== History ==
The Blackland area was probably part of the king's large Calne estate in the 10th century or earlier. By the late 12th century Blackland was a separate manor, with its own church. The name was also adopted for a tithing which was larger than the manor, and by the early 19th century included land in Calne, Calstone Wellington and Calstone parishes. Blackland parish was abolished on 26 March 1890, all the tithing forming part of the new Calne Without parish, which also absorbed Calstone Wellington. At the 1901 census, there were 33 houses in the former Blackland parish area. Boundary changes in 2025 transferred Blackland, Calstone Wellington and Calstone to Cherhill parish.

In the late 12th century the manor was held by Richard de Canville, governor of Cyprus, who died in 1191 during the Third Crusade at the Siege of Acre. His son Gerard (d. 1214) married Nicola de la Haie (c.1150–1230) who brought Lincolnshire estates to the family. The manor (except for Blackland Farm, which was in separate ownership) was sold by a descendant, and by 1282 had been sold or given to Malmesbury Abbey, who kept it until the dissolution of 1539. The Wiltshire Victoria County History traces the later owners, including Thomas Maundrell, who built Blackland House in the 1760s.

Owners of Blackland Farm included from 1570 Thomas Goddard of Upper Upham (near Aldbourne), and from 1770 to 1957 the Petty-Fitzmaurice family, later Marquesses of Lansdowne (the owners of Bowood).

Blacklands Park Farmhouse, west of the hamlet, was built in ashlar in the mid to late 18th century. Part of a defensive moat from an earlier building is still in water.

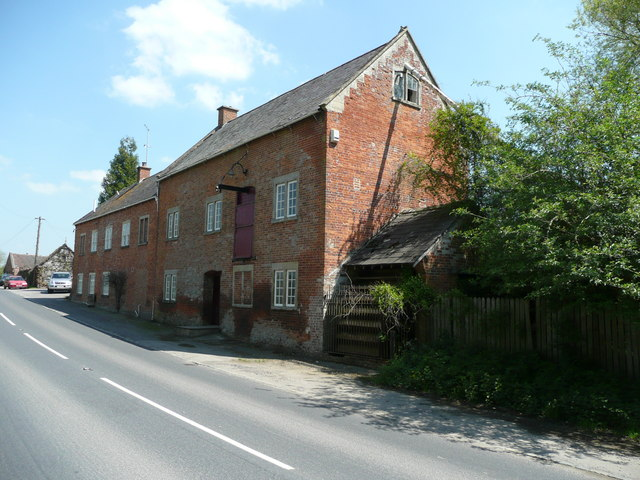
Blackland Mill

Blackland Mill stands on the River Marden downstream from the church, where there has been a corn mill probably since the 13th century, and certainly since 1728. The present substantial structure is a rebuilding of 1800-1810 in red brick with stone windows, and retains its iron waterwheel. The mill was in operation until c.1915–1920, and again from 1983 to 1993. The adjoining stable of c.1810 has a roof described by Historic England as "an exceptional example of early use of iron in roof construction" and is Grade II* listed.

A farm at Blackland Mill was bought by champion jockey Billy Higgs in 1909 and developed as a stud. It was bought in 1928 by Fred Darling, a successful trainer based not far away at Beckhampton, and after his death in 1953 was bought by the brothers G. R. and M. J. Maundrell, who continued the business until the early 1970s. As of 2022 there is still a small equestrian business on the site.

Blackland had no school. From around 1846 children could attend the school at Calstone, which remained open until 1962.

== Blackland House ==
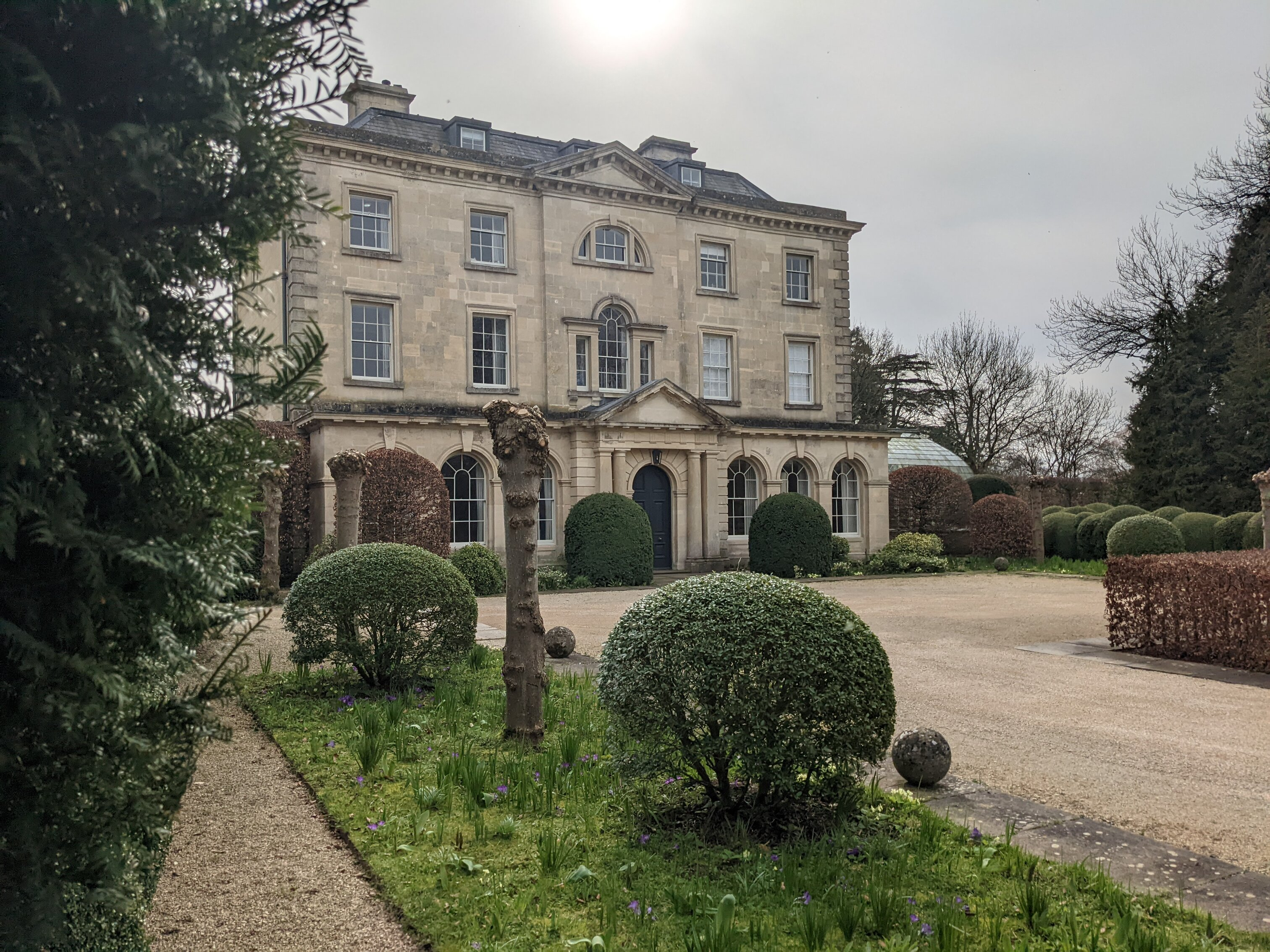
North front of Blackland House

Blackland House (or Blackland Park), opposite the church, is a three-storey ashlar house built in the 1760s for Thomas Maundrell. The formal north and south fronts have five windows; the north has a centre bay with pediment and lunette, and 1858 additions to the ground floor; on the south (garden) side the central doorway has a pair of Doric columns, and the house overlooks a small lake made by damming the Marden. On the west side the late-19th-century conservatory is described as "curvaceous" by Orbach, and to the east is a single-storey late-20th-century extension.

Owners in the 20th century included from 1973 to 1987 the fashion designer Rupert Lycett Green and his wife, the writer Candida Lycett Green. The house has 5 acres (2 ha) of gardens. The present owners, who run a floristry business from the former coach house, restored two walled gardens and planted 15,000 tulips. A collection of tulip cultivars is accredited with Plant Heritage under the National Plant Collection scheme.

Just east of the house is a two-storey stable block with a large central dovecote, built in rubble stone in the mid-18th-century. A lodge at the north-west entrance to the grounds, on the London-Bath road, was built in squared ashlar in the mid to late 19th century.

== Parish church ==
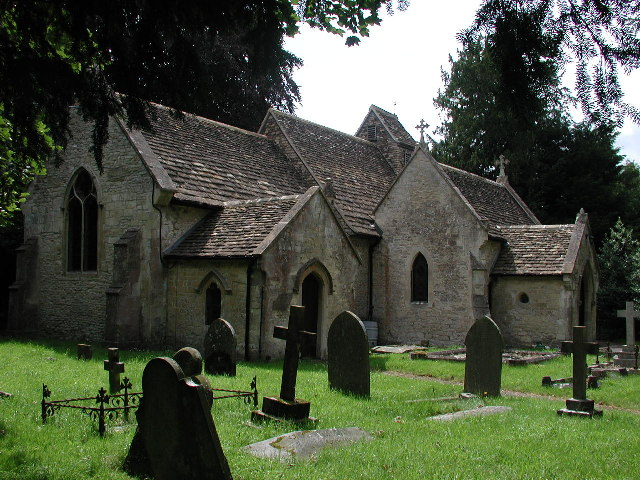
St Peter's Church

The church, which probably dates from the 13th century, is a small rubble building with a west bellcote. In the chancel two small windows are 13th century and Orbach states that two triangular-headed windows have Anglo-Saxon monolith surrounds. The two-light east window is 14th century and in that century the chancel roof was replaced and the nave rebuilt; these roofs are still in place.

The font is either 12th century (Orbach) or 13th (Historic England) on a 19th-century base. The single bell was cast in 1671 although there had been two in 1553. A north addition, with a barrel-vaulted ceiling of the late 17th century or early 18th, was until 1858 reserved for the owners of Blackland House.

A north vestry was added to the chancel in 1842 and in 1858–9 the church was "over-restored" (according to Orbach) by Henry Weaver. The work included buttressing the addition, remodelling it as an aisle and moving the porch to that side, as well as changes to the nave windows and re-fronting of the west gallery. Further restoration in 1907 by C.E. Ponting saw stained glass by Kempe & Co. installed in the east window, and a new screen, stalls, pulpit and reredos.

The church was originally dedicated to St Nicholas but by 1851 it was called St Peter's. The building was designated as Grade II* listed in 1960.

The church was probably built by the lord of the manor as a chapel dependent on St Mary, Calne, but had its own rector by 1361 and the incumbent received tithes from the manor; it later became independent of Calne and was a peculiar of the Dean of Salisbury until most aspects of that jurisdiction were abolished in 1846. The benefice was united with that of Calstone Wellington in 1881; the rector or their curate had already lived there since 1843. In 1962 the union was undone: the north and west parts of Blackland were united with Calne to form the parish of Calne with Blackland, and the rest was united with Heddington. Today the parish is part of the Marden Vale benefice, alongside St Mary and Holy Trinity at Calne, and the churches of Bremhill, Derry Hill and Foxham. The actor David Hemmings is buried at St. Peter's.
