= Shaun Commerford =

Zimbabwean cricketer (born 1981)

Personal information
- Full name: Shaun Richard Commerford
- Born: 24 March 1981 (age 45); Bulawayo, Zimbabwe
- Batting: Right-handed
- Bowling: Right-arm fast-medium

Domestic team information
- Years: Team
- 1999/2000: Matabeleland

Career statistics
Competition	FC
Matches	3
Runs scored	43
Batting average	8.60
100s/50s	0/0
Top score	21
Balls bowled	510
Wickets	5
Bowling average	50.60
5 wickets in innings	0
10 wickets in match	0
Best bowling	2/23
Catches/stumpings	0/–
- Source: ESPNcricinfo, 20 July 2021

Shaun Richard Commerford (born 24 March 1981) is a former Zimbabwean cricketer. A right-handed batsman and right-arm fast-medium bowler, he played three first-class matches for Matabeleland during the 1999–2000 Logan Cup.
