= Oldbury (surname) =

Oldbury is a surname. Notable people with the surname include:

- Derek Oldbury (1924–1994), British draughts champion
- Ede Oldbury (1888–1977), New Zealand domestic servant, storekeeper, and community leader
