= Eric Comerford =

Australian rules footballer, born 1912

Personal information
- Full name: Eric Comerford
- Born: 3 July 1912
- Died: 26 July 1989 (aged 77)
- Original team: Oakleigh
- Height: 178 cm (5 ft 10 in)
- Weight: 78 kg (172 lb)

Playing career^{1}
Years	Club	Games (Goals)
1942, 1945	St Kilda	20 (2)
- ^{1} Playing statistics correct to the end of 1945.

Eric Comerford (3 July 1912 – 26 July 1989) was an Australian rules footballer who played with St Kilda in the Victorian Football League (VFL).
