= Lansdowne Monument =

Stone obelisk in Wiltshire, England

Coordinates: 51.4228°N 1.9327°W

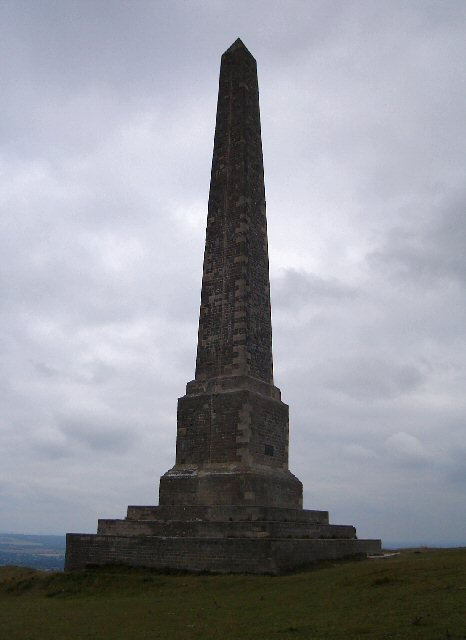
Lansdowne Monument

The Lansdowne Monument, also known as the Cherhill Monument, near Cherhill in Wiltshire, England, is a 38-metre (125 foot) stone obelisk erected in 1845 by Henry Petty-Fitzmaurice, 3rd Marquess of Lansdowne to the designs of Sir Charles Barry to commemorate his ancestor, Sir William Petty (1623–1687).

The monument is 65 years younger than Cherhill White Horse, about 330 metres away.

The monument was designated as Grade II* listed in 1986, and restored by the National Trust in 1990. In 2010 fencing was erected around the monument to protect visitors from falling masonry.

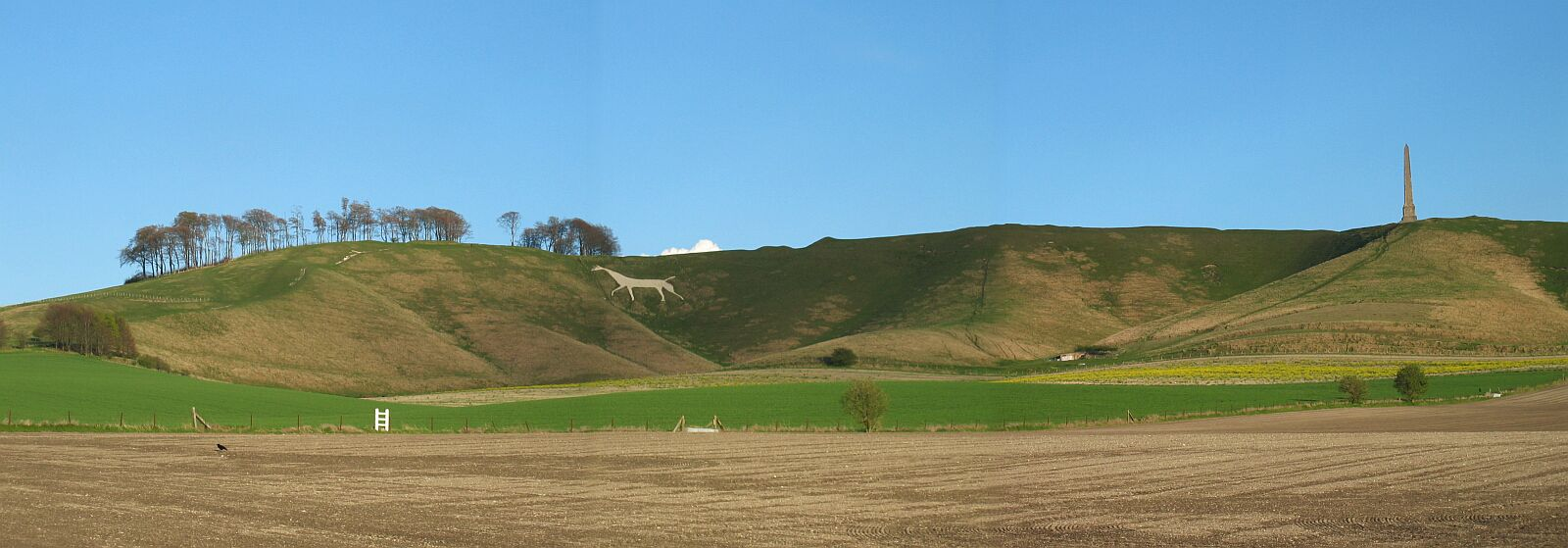
The monument and Cherhill White Horse
