= Olympiad Leisure Centre =

Leisure centre in Chippenham, England

Coordinates: 51°27′40″N 2°06′50″W

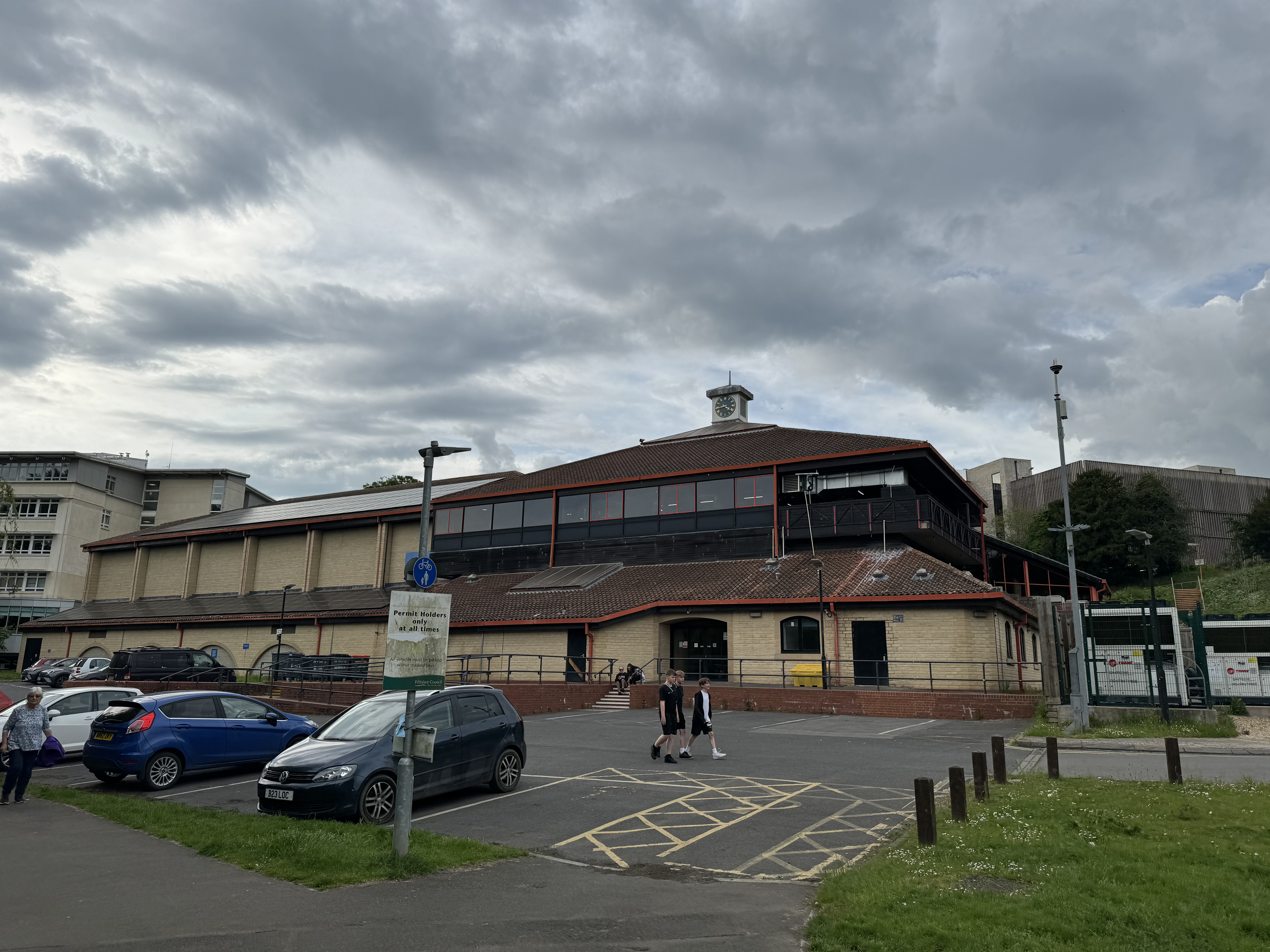
The Olympiad in 2024, seen from Monkton Park

The Olympiad Leisure Centre is a leisure centre in Chippenham, Wiltshire, England.

== History ==
The centre opened in 1989 and is owned by Wiltshire Council.

In late 2019, the swimming pool was closed to allow the water slides to be removed.

In January 2023, the sauna was closed along with saunas in six other centres in Wiltshire as a cost-saving measure due to rising energy prices.

In July 2024, the gym was refurbished and its equipment renewed.

== Facilities ==
The Olympiad Leisure Centre has a four-lane 25-metre swimming pool, sports hall, squash courts, and fitness suite.
