= Murder of Ellie Gould =

Murder of an English student

Eleanor Gould
- Born: 6 February 2002
- Died: 3 May 2019 (aged 17); Calne, Wiltshire, England
- Cause of death: Stabbing
- Occupation: Student
- Known for: Murder victim

Ellie Gould (6 February 2002 – 3 May 2019) was a 17-year-old English sixth form student from Calne, Wiltshire, who was stabbed to death on 3 May 2019 by Thomas Griffiths, a fellow student at her school, who was also 17 at the time. Griffiths stabbed Gould after she ended their relationship of three months. Griffiths was subsequently charged with Gould's murder and pleaded guilty at Bristol Crown Court, where he was sentenced in November 2019 to life imprisonment with a minimum term of twelve-and-a-half years in custody before becoming eligible for parole. Because he was under 21 at the time of sentencing, the law prevented him from receiving a whole life order.

A campaign launched by Gould's friends to have self-defence lessons taught in schools was debated in Parliament, and an education minister agreed to issue guidelines for schools wishing to hold self-defence classes. Gould's mother, Carole, subsequently campaigned to have the law changed to enable young offenders to be treated more like adults when convicted of serious crimes, such as murder. Her campaign for "Ellie's Law" led to the presentation of the Police, Crime, Sentencing and Courts Bill by Robert Buckland, the Secretary of State for Justice, to the House of Commons on 9 March 2021. Carole Gould was also appointed an OBE in the 2025 New Year Honours for her work co-founding the support group Killed Women.

== Biography ==
Born on 6 February 2002, Eleanor “Ellie” Gould was the daughter of Matthew and Carole Gould, and lived with her family in Calne, Wiltshire. At the time of her death, she was a Year Twelve Sixth Form student at Hardenhuish School in Chippenham and was studying for her A Levels. A keen horse rider, she was a member of her school's equestrian team, and participated in local equestrian events. She also competed in cross country. She had ambitions to join the mounted police and study psychology at university.

In January 2019, shortly before turning 17, Gould began dating fellow A Level student Thomas Griffiths whom she had known since they were in Year Seven. Griffiths was her first boyfriend. Gould's mother has commented that her husband "wasn't overly keen" on Griffiths "because he didn't say much", but she assumed this aspect of his character was just down to his age. As Gould's exams approached, she wanted to focus on her studies, and felt the relationship was not right for her, so ended it in early May. Gould said that she felt suffocated by Griffiths' attention, and on the night before her murder, told friends he had not taken the split well.

== Murder ==
On 3 May 2019, Griffiths, of Derry Hill, Wiltshire, was dropped off at school by his mother. After emailing his teachers to tell them he was feeling unwell, he walked to Chippenham bus station where he caught a bus back to Derry Hill, before returning home. His mother also returned home, and after hiding in the wardrobe of his bedroom so that she would not discover him absent from school, and waiting for her to depart again, he took the keys to a silver Ford Focus and drove to Gould's house. Following an argument, Griffiths attempted to strangle her, then used a knife he had taken from the family kitchen to stab her in the neck 13 times.

Griffiths spent an hour at the house attempting to clean up the crime scene, using clothes to do this which he placed in a plastic bag. He also washed his trainers in the kitchen sink, and cleaned the knife using an apron, before placing it in Gould's hand so as to make her injuries appear to be self-inflicted. He then used Gould's finger to unlock her mobile phone and, posing as her, texted one of her friends who was due to give her a lift to school, telling the friend not to collect her. After returning home to change, Griffiths put his clothes in the washing machine, then dumped the bag of bloodied items in a local woodland. A neighbour saw him returning from the woods and drove him back to school, where he was subsequently collected by his mother. Later that day, he sent text messages to friends saying that he and Gould were "going on a break [from their relationship] and see how thinks [sic] go after exams", and to Gould's phone asking her if they could meet. Gould's body was discovered by her father at 3 pm that afternoon in her kitchen.

== Arrest and legal proceedings ==
Wiltshire Police arrested Griffiths on suspicion of murder at 6 pm on 3 May, outside a friend's house in Calne, and he was taken to Melksham police station to be held for questioning. Evidence was gathered from Griffiths' mobile phone and CCTV cameras tracking his movements, and a neighbour who saw someone matching his description outside Gould's house. Griffiths also had marks on his neck that were consistent with defence wounds. He initially denied involvement in Gould's death, claiming not to have seen her that day, and also that he had arranged to go to her house so the pair could study together. Police then matched blood on his trainers with that belonging to Gould, and he was charged with her murder.

Griffiths was charged with murder on 6 May, and appeared before Salisbury Magistrates Court the following day. He appeared at Bristol Crown Court on 9 May, where a provisional trial date was set for 28 October. He did not enter a plea, and was remanded in custody. At a plea hearing on 29 August 2019, Griffiths pleaded guilty to Gould's murder, and was remanded in custody to await sentence. Recorder Peter Blair QC also lifted reporting restrictions that prevented Griffiths being named by media outlets, describing his crime as "extremely grave".

Griffiths's sentencing hearing took place on 8 November, where Richard Smith QC spoke for the prosecution and Sasha Wass QC represented the defence. The court was told that Griffiths had argued with Gould prior to her death, and that a post mortem showed pressure applied to her neck had incapacitated her. There was evidence to suggest that after the murder he had placed the knife in Gould's left hand in an attempt to make it appear as though she had inflicted the injuries on herself. It was also said that Griffiths claimed to not remember the events of what had happened, and tried to explain marks on his neck as being from self-harm, but that they were more likely to be a result of his "young victim fighting for her life".

A letter written by Griffiths to the court was read out, in which he expressed "heartfelt remorse" for his actions: "I'm so sorry. I know my apologies and explanations will never be enough but I hope in time I can show how truly sorry I am". He also claimed his "mental health was not good" at the time of the murder. Sentencing Griffiths, Judge Mr Justice Garnham described his actions as a "frenzied knife attack" and "the most appalling act" on a "vulnerable young woman in her own home where she should have been safe...The effects of your actions have not only snuffed out the life of this talented girl... but loaded pain on her friends and family". But it was ruled that the murder was not premeditated because Griffiths did not take the weapon with him. Griffiths was sentenced to life imprisonment with a minimum term of twelve-and-a-half years, before he is eligible for parole. Because of his age, the law prevented him from receiving a whole life tariff.

== Aftermath and Ellie's Law ==
Gould's funeral was held on 29 May at St Mary's Church, Calne. The service was attended by family and friends.

Following Griffiths's sentence, the case was subsequently referred to the Attorney General's office under the unduly lenient sentences scheme, but on 6 December 2019, it was announced that it could not be referred to the Court of Appeal because the law prevents people under the age of 21 from being given a whole life tariff. Speaking about the decision, Carole Gould described the legal process as a "crazy system" where those under the age of 18 "have the same starting point" as younger children: "There's a huge difference between a 10-year-old and an 18-year-old. And really, the laws need to be changed".

Gould's friends began a campaign to have compulsory self-defence lessons taught in schools, feeling that basic knowledge of self-defence would have saved her life, and that it should be taught alongside subjects like swimming and road safety. The campaign was backed by James Gray, the MP for North Wiltshire, and on 12 March 2020, the matter was debated in the House of Commons. Vicky Ford, a junior minister with the Department for Education, ruled out making self-defence lessons compulsory for schools, but agreed to issue guidelines and ask headteachers if they felt self-defence classes were "right for their schools". She said the "balance of risk" was much clearer with things such as swimming and road safety, but that teaching self-defence relied very much on the "age and maturity" of pupils and their understanding that it could only be used in emergencies.

Carole Gould subsequently campaigned for the introduction of "Ellie's Law" that would enable young offenders to be treated more like adults when convicted of serious crimes, such as murder. In August 2020, the Daily Telegraph reported that Robert Buckland, the Secretary of State for Justice, was reviewing the sentencing process, and considering a graded approach depending on the age of the offender. At the time, the case of Hashem Abedi, the brother of the Manchester Arena bomber, had also recently resulted in him not qualifying for a whole life tariff because he was 20 at the time of the bombing.

On 16 September, Buckland presented the Sentencing White Paper to the House of Commons, which includes provisions to amend the law with regard to young offenders who commit serious crimes. The paper was criticised by Gould's family because the new law would not apply in the case of a defendant who did not take a weapon to the scene of a murder, such as Griffiths. Gould's parents subsequently wrote to Gray to request their daughter's name be removed from the proposals if they were not amended. On 9 March 2021, Buckland introduced the Police, Crime, Sentencing and Courts Bill that allows the law to treat future teenage killers like adults, thus increasing the minimum sentence they can be given to as much as 27 years. Although the legislation does not apply retrospectively, it removes the right of killers such as Griffiths to have their sentences reviewed. Carole Gould described the changes as "a huge cloud that's been lifted from above our heads"

In November 2022, and along with several other women who lost female relatives as a result of male violence, Carole Gould co-founded Killed Women, a group for the families of women murdered by men, which has campaigned to strengthen domestic homicide laws. Together with Julie Devey, another co-founder whose daughter was murdered by an ex-boyfriend, Gould was appointed an OBE in the 2025 New Year Honours for her work with the group. She described the honour as "bittersweet".

== Independent review ==
In November 2021, the findings of an independent review of the case were published. The report found that Griffiths had attempted to disrupt Gould's studies in an act known as "educational sabotage". This was described as "a less known form of coercive control and economic abuse which disrupts a victim's ability to gain educational qualifications and furthers a perpetrator's power and control over them". The report also recommended that, while there were no agency failings or shortcomings, more should be done to promote the service available in Wiltshire to victims of domestic abuse and coercion.

== Documentaries ==
The Ellie Gould case was the subject of two television documentaries that aired in the UK in October and November 2020. The 31 October episode of Britain's Deadliest Kids was broadcast by Quest Red, while on 2 November, the Crime and Investigation documentary Murder At My Door covered the case. The film featured many of Gould's schoolfriends, who had co-operated with the makers, and was introduced by actress Kym Marsh. The case was also the subject of an edition of the Channel 5 documentary series Killer at the Crime Scene that aired on 5STAR on 25 August 2022.
