= Baron Wilington =

Extinct barony in the Peerage of England

Baron Wilington was a title in the Peerage of England. It was created on 14 June 1329 when John de Wilington was summoned to Parliament. The barony became extinct on the death of the second Baron on 14 April 1348.

== Barons Wilington (1329) ==
- John de Wilington, 1st Baron Wilington (d. 1338)
- Ralph de Wilington, 2nd Baron Wilington (d. 1348)
