= Nicholas Quemerford =

Irish Jesuit priest

Nicholas Quemerford (c. 1554–1599) was an Irish Jesuit priest who was one of the sixteen Waterford Jesuits of the name living in the half century between 1590 and 1640.

== Life ==
He was born in the city of Waterford in Ireland about 1544, and was educated in the Kilkenny school of Peter White. He took the degree of BA at Oxford in 1562, after he had spent at least four years in that university in pecking and hewing at logic and philosophy.

After completing his degree by determination he returned to Ireland, was ordained priest, and obtained some ecclesiastical preferment from which he was ejected on account of his religion. Repairing to the University of Louvain, he was promoted to the degree of DD on 23 June or October 1575, on which occasion his fellow-countryman, Peter Lombard, who that year was "primus in schola artium", wrote "Carmen Heroicum in Doctoratum Nicolai Quemerfordi". He entered the Society of Jesus about 1578.

He died in Spain about 1599.
