= River Marden =

River in Wiltshire, England

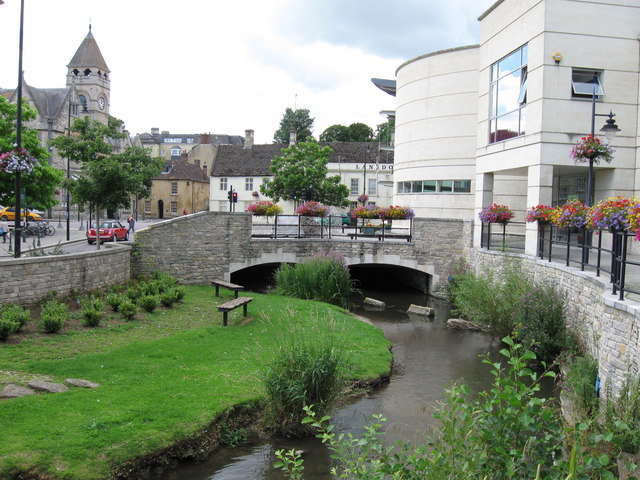
- The Marden in the Wiltshire market town of Calne

Location
- Country: United Kingdom
- Region: Wiltshire

Physical characteristics
- Source: Ranscombe Bottom
  - location: Calstone Wellington, near Calne, Wiltshire
  - coordinates: 51°24′56″N 2°0′48″W
  - elevation: 328 ft (100 m)
- Mouth: Bristol Avon
  - location: near Chippenham, Wiltshire
  - coordinates: 51°27′56″N 2°05′33″W
  - elevation: 151 ft (46 m)
- Length: 7 mi (11 km)
- Discharge
  - average: 43 cu ft/s (1.2 m^{3}/s)
  - minimum: 3.9 cu ft/s (0.11 m^{3}/s)
  - maximum: 1,529 cu ft/s (43.3 m^{3}/s)

Basin features
- Tributaries
  - left: Puddington Brook
  - right: Rivers Brook, Abberd Brook, Fisher's Brook, Cowage Brook

The River Marden is a small tributary of the River Avon in England. It flows from the hills surrounding Calne and meets the Avon about a mile upstream of Chippenham. The river has a mean flow of 43 cubic feet per second (1.2 m^{3}/s).

== Course ==
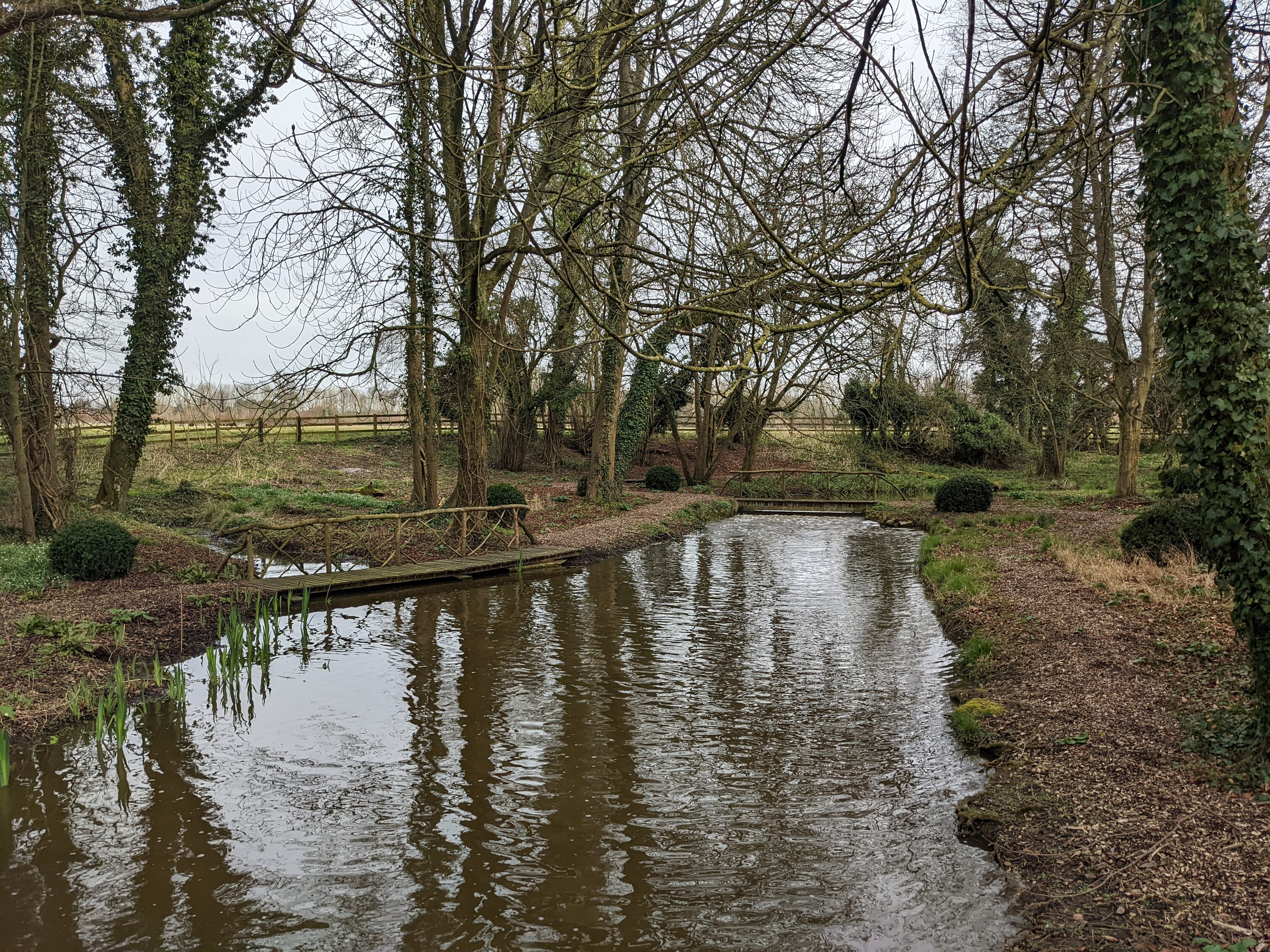
The Marden in the grounds of Blackland House, upstream of Calne

The Marden rises just north of the valley of Ranscombe Bottom near Calstone Wellington in Wiltshire. It then flows in a north-west direction through the Blackland area, where it forms a small ornamental lake at Blackland House, and on to Quemerford, where it is joined on the right bank by the Rivers Brook. In Calne, the Abberd Brook joins on the right. The river turns in a westerly direction and is joined by the overspill from Bowood Lake, part of the Bowood House estate, on the left at Studleybrook Farm. The river is then joined by the combined Fisher's and Cowage brooks before turning to the north-west, past the village of Stanley. 1.5 miles (2.4 km) later it joins the Bristol Avon to the north-east of Chippenham.

== History ==
The Domesday survey of England in 1086 records four watermills on the Marden at Calne. In the 18th century four fulling mills are recorded and one of these, Upper Mill, became a paper mill in 1768 and continued in operation until 1860. Hassell's Mill at Studley remained in operation until 1960.

A branch of the Wilts & Berks Canal, opened in 1810, paralleled the course of the Marden west of Calne. The canal was closed in 1914 following the collapse into the river of the Stanley aqueduct in 1901. Traces of the canal and its towpath survive.

== Hydrology ==
The Environment Agency gauging station at Stanley has measured the mean flow of the river as 43 cubic feet per second (1.2 m^{3}/s), with a maximum recorded flow of 1,529 cubic feet per second (43.3 m^{3}/s) on 30 October 2000 and a minimum of 3.9 cubic feet per second (0.11 m^{3}/s) on 21 August 1976.
