= Quemerford =

Suburb of Calne, Wiltshire, England

Coordinates: 51.426°N 1.987°W

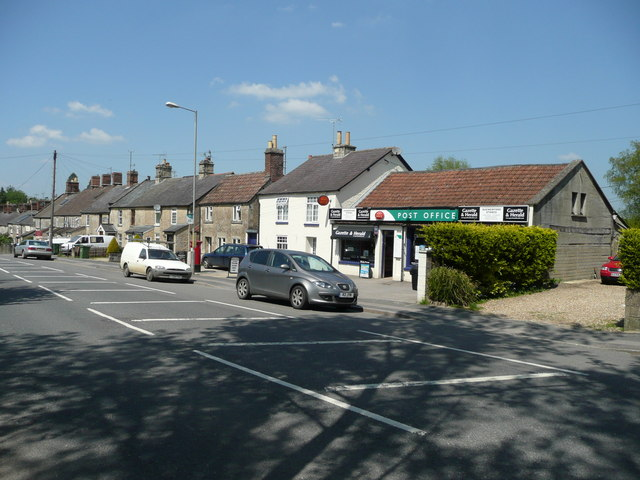
- Quemerford Post Office and Stores, 2008

- Location within Wiltshire
- OS grid reference: SU008697
- Civil parish: Calne
- Unitary authority: Wiltshire
- Ceremonial county: Wiltshire
- Region: South West
- Country: England
- Sovereign state: United Kingdom
- Post town: Calne
- Postcode district: SN11
- Dialling code: 01249
- Police: Wiltshire
- Fire: Dorset and Wiltshire
- Ambulance: South Western
- UK Parliament: Melksham and Devizes

Quemerford is a southeastern suburb of the town of Calne in the county of Wiltshire, England. It is within both the Calne and Calne Without civil parishes, and lies on the A4 road towards Marlborough, which is some 12 miles (19 km) to the east.

The River Marden flows in a westerly direction to the south of Quemerford, then turns north and passes under the A4 on its way to Calne. A tributary of the Marden, the River's Brook, passes north of Quemerford.

== History ==
According to etymologists, the name is derived from the Old English Cynemaeres-ford, meaning the ford at the royal (cyne) boundary (maere) or lake (mere). Ekwall notes the early variants of the name include Camerford (1204), Kemerford (1226-1228), Quemerford (1240-1245), Cameresford (1292), and Quemerforde (1294).

Earthworks from a medieval rural settlement, including house platforms, are found on a site south of Quemerford Farm. The site is a scheduled ancient monument. The track from the farm continues south to St Peter's church at Blackland (outside Calne parish), which dates from the late 12th century. Later there was no clear nucleus of settlement, with dispersed farmsteads (ten in 1728) east of the Marden.

The surname Comerford originated in Quemerford as a toponymic surname by the thirteenth century.

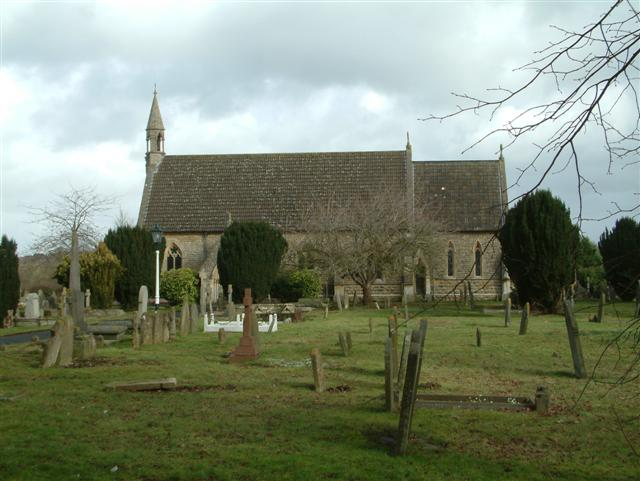
Holy Trinity church

By the mid-19th century, Quemerford had a population of 635. Holy Trinity church, a chapel of ease for St Mary's, was built in 1852–3, and its churchyard became the graveyard for Calne parish. In 1866-7 a school was built close to the church.

From 1940 to 1964, RAF Compton Bassett, a technical training camp with no airfield, was about 1 mile (1.6 km) northeast of Quemerford.

== Mills ==
The River Marden was long used as a source of power for watermills, with fulling mills recorded in the 16th century. In 1694 the Chivers family had two mills: one just south of the bridge on the London road, later known as Lower Mill or Quemerford Mill; and one about a quarter of a mile upstream, which became Upper Mill or Provender Mill.

Lower Mill was rebuilt c. 1790 as a water-powered cloth factory, with a steam engine added in 1815. The cloth industry declined and the mill was converted to a corn mill in 1841, then used for animal feed production from 1949 to c. 1980. It is now in residential use.

Upper Mill was used for corn by 1828 and greatly enlarged in 1860. A second mill was built on the same site in 1935 and both were acquired by Rank Hovis McDougall in 1943 and Dalgety & Co in 1982. Milling ceased in 1982 and the newer mill was demolished in 1986; the old mill was converted for use as offices.

== Today ==
Quemerford today is mostly an Edwardian terrace and a long line of mainly 1930s houses.

The school gained additional buildings in the 1960s and became Holy Trinity C of E Academy in 2012.

Quemerford has a pub, the Talbot Inn, and a shop with a post office.
