= Calne =

Town and civil parish in Wiltshire, England

Coordinates: 51.438°N 2.005°W

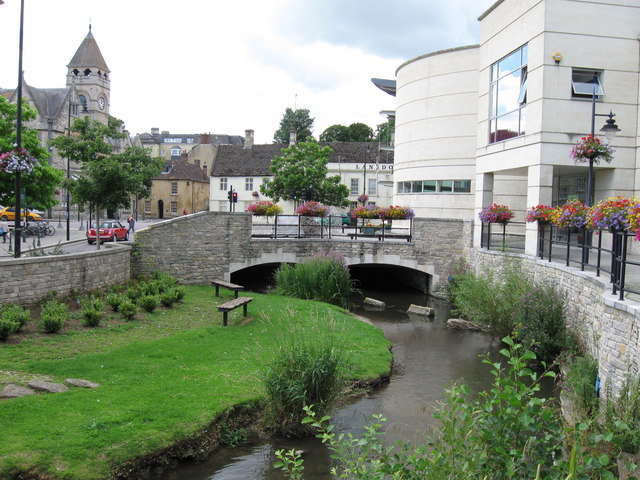
- River Marden, Calne town centre

- Flag

- Location within Wiltshire
- Population: 19,074 (2021 Census)
- OS grid reference: ST997710
- Unitary authority: Wiltshire
- Ceremonial county: Wiltshire
- Region: South West
- Country: England
- Sovereign state: United Kingdom
- Post town: CALNE
- Postcode district: SN11
- Dialling code: 01249
- Police: Wiltshire
- Fire: Dorset and Wiltshire
- Ambulance: South Western
- UK Parliament: Chippenham Melksham and Devizes
- Website: Town Council

Calne (/kɑːn/, locally /kɒln/) is a town and civil parish in Wiltshire, southwestern England, at the northwestern extremity of the North Wessex Downs hill range, a designated Area of Outstanding Natural Beauty.

Calne is on a small river, the Marden, that rises 2 miles (3 kilometres) away in the Wessex Downs, and is the only town on that river. It is on the A4 road national route 19 mi (31 km) east of Bath, 6 mi (10 km) east of Chippenham, 13 mi (21 km) west of Marlborough and 16 mi (26 km) southwest of Swindon. Wiltshire's county town of Trowbridge is 15 mi (24 km) to the southwest, with London 82 mi (132 km) due east as the crow flies. At the 2021 Census, Calne had 19,074 inhabitants.

== History ==
=== Middle ages ===
In 978, Anglo-Saxon Calne was the site of a large two-storey building with a hall on the first floor. It was here that St Dunstan, Archbishop of Canterbury met the Witenagemot to justify his controversial organisation of the national church, which involved the secular priests being replaced by Benedictine monks and the influence of landowners over churches on their lands being taken away. According to an account written about 1000, at one point in this meeting Dunstan called upon God to support his cause, at which point the floor collapsed killing most of his opponents, whilst Dunstan and his supporters were in the part that remained standing. This was claimed as a miracle by Dunstan's supporters. In 1086 Calne may already have been, as it was later, a market town on the main Bristol-London road, with 114 households and a church. 74 or more households were held almost outright by burghal tenure (as citizens of a borough), and the lordship of its large outlying land was divided between the king (of whom 45 burgesses were tenants) and the church.

In the Middle Ages the king's successor as the lord of Calne manor and, as owner of the church's revenues, the treasurer of Salisbury Cathedral, each had the right to hold a market and a fair in the town, with two triangular market places or fair grounds. A modest hospital was provided on a modest endowment from 1248 until it provided no accommodation in 1546 and was sold two years later by the Crown.

Chaveywell in Castle Park

=== Modern era ===
Reflecting the large area of the king's estate, until the late 19th century Calne had tithings at Eastmead Street, Quemerford, Whetham, Whitley, and part of Beversbrook, all now within Calne parish; and furthermore Blackland, Calstone, Stock, Stockley and Studley, all now in the surrounding parishes.

Calne suffered an epidemic between 1880 and 1890 and Chaverywell (now in Castle Park) was the only clean water source available to residents.

==== Industry ====
Calne had a significant woollen broadcloth industry in the 18th century, and evidence of this can be seen set around the triangular green by the parish church, where 24 listed buildings remain, five at Grade II* including the Tounson almshouses for the neediest poor and Georgian era clothiers' houses. Nearby are some of the 14 original mills along the Marden. St Mary's church was extended by the generous donations of rich clothiers and wool merchants in the 15th century.

Houses of the 17th and 18th centuries have external walls of stone and timber-framed walls inside. Most of the stone is limestone rubble, laid with ashlar dressings in houses of higher quality; the walls of many houses were rendered smooth. Until the 19th century, quarries beside the London road northwest and southeast of the town were sources of stone for building.

A relic of 19th century lime extraction, a kiln, exists in the grounds of St Mary's School. This solid marine deposition is chiefly one chemical, calcium carbonate, and is dug in nearby pits for its main use in cement and as fertiliser on acid ground.

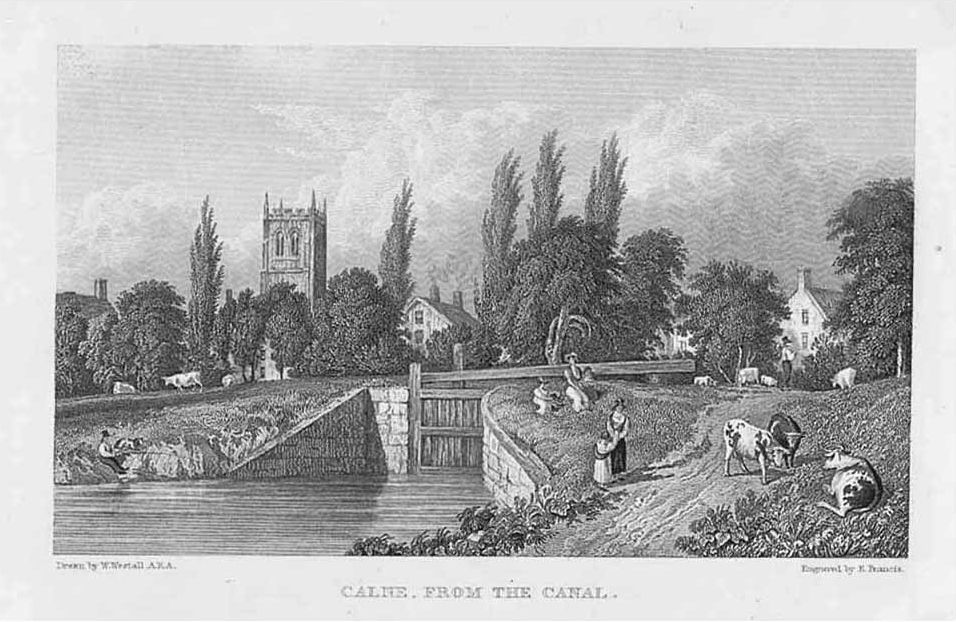
A view of Calne from the canal, 1828

==== Canal ====
The Wilts & Berks Canal linked the Kennet and Avon Canal at Semington, near Melksham, to the River Thames at Abingdon. Much of the traffic on the canal was coal from the Somerset Coalfield. As the canal passed through open country near Stanley, east of Chippenham, a short branch led through three locks to a wharf in Calne. The canal was completed in 1810 and abandoned in 1914.

==== Railway ====
Calne railway station opened in 1863, the terminus of its own branch line of the Great Western Railway running east from Chippenham, with one intermediate stop: Stanley Bridge Halt. The opening of Black Dog Halt in the early 20th century provided insufficient demand to slow a progressive decline. The branch closed as a result of the Beeching Axe in September 1965, having made the biggest loss per mile of any line in the country.

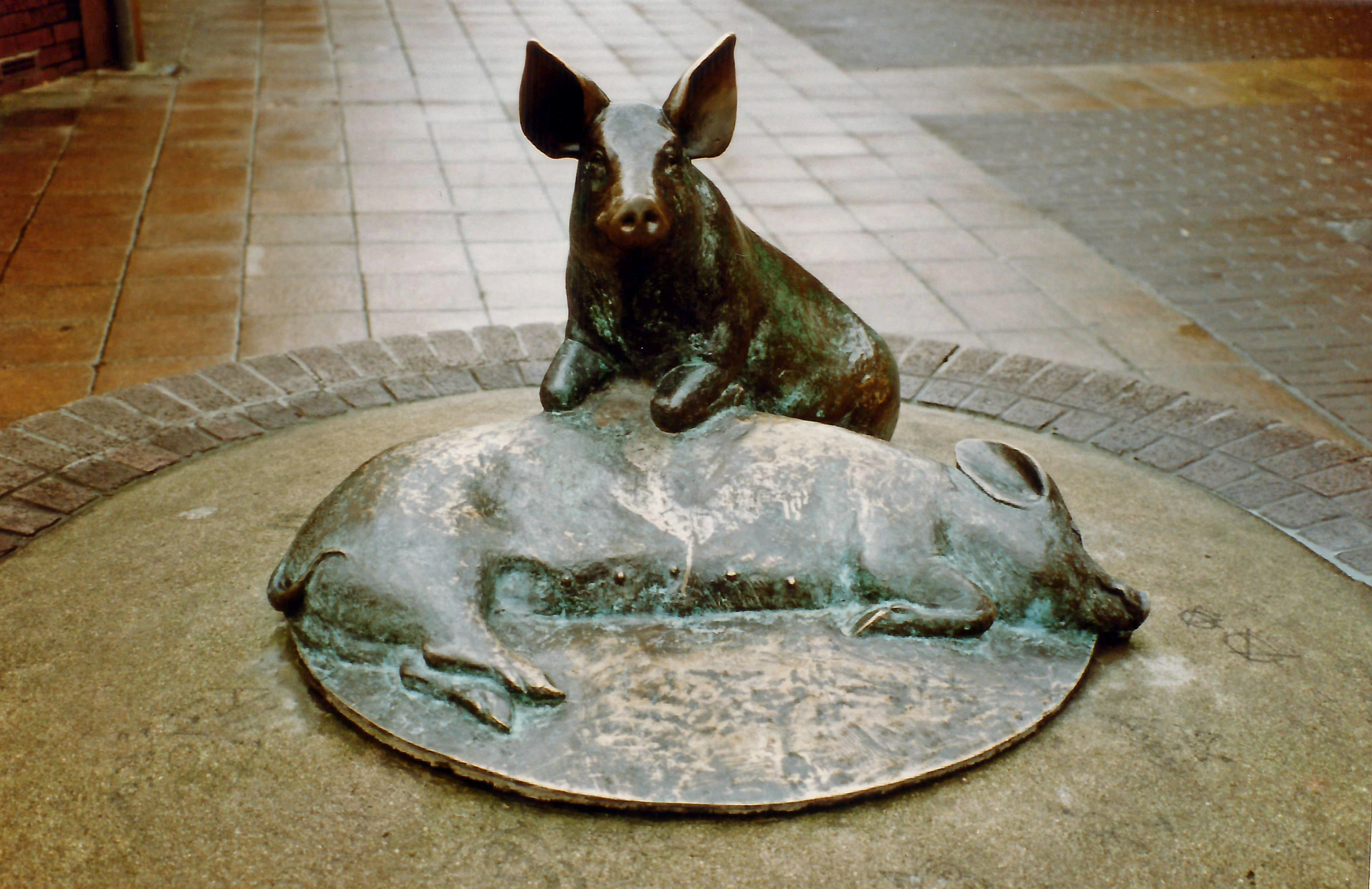
Bronze sculpture in Calne commemorating the town's longstanding pork-curing industry, by local artist Richard Cowdy

==== Wiltshire pork and ham ====
Subsequently, Calne's main industry other than being a small market town was the imposing C&T Harris pork processing factory. It is said that the pork-curing industry developed because pigs reared in Ireland were landed at Bristol and then herded across England on drovers' roads to Smithfield, London. One resting place for the pigs was at Black Dog Hill, just west of the town, and the Harris family of butchers took the pigs that were not expected to survive the onward journey.

The Harris business began in the second half of the 18th century, when widow Sarah Harris and her son John relocated from Devizes and began trading as pork butchers in Church Street (Butchers Row). Brothers John and Henry Harris, sons of John Harris, continued separately in business, at High Street and the original Church Street shop respectively. Their products included bacon and hams preserved using the Wiltshire cure method, which the family had developed.

John Harris and his wife Mary Perkins had eleven children, and three of them, Thomas, George, and Charles, expanded the family business. The businesses of Charles and Thomas merged in 1888 as C. & T. Harris & Co. C&T Harris documented their work in a company magazine between 1927 and 1939, each issue containing an article by their managing director, Sir John Bodinnar.

C&T Harris built a five-storey factory in the centre of the town in the 1930s, which at its height employed 2,000 people to process 5,000 pigs each week into bacon, pies, sausages and cooked meats. The business declined in the 1970s, due in part to competition from Danish bacon. The company (by now Farmers Meat Company Ltd) closed in 1982, and the factory was demolished over the next two years. Its site was later redeveloped as housing and the town's public library. The departed industry is celebrated by a bronze sculpture of two pigs, installed in 1979 by Calne Civic Society on Phelps Parade in the town centre.

== Economy ==
During the late 1990s and early 2000s, Calne saw rapid expansion compared to most other towns in the South West region, with a population which the district council projected to peak at around 19,000 by 2015 but which has since been surpassed. The Lansdowne Park housing development (completed in early 2007) has substantially increased the size of the town, creating a new northwestern suburb, including a new primary school, a medical centre and a small shopping area. This area has attracted professional workers from traditionally more expensive areas such as Bath, Bristol, Marlborough and as far afield as the 'silicon valley' towns of central Berkshire. The development's name reflects its proximity to the seat of the Marquess of Lansdowne, whose family have owned the nearby Bowood House country estate since 1784.

The Porte Marsh Industrial Estate on the north side of the town provides the bulk of the town's internal employment, and is home to around 100 companies in predominantly light industries and information technology. The Belgian company Deceuninck has invested considerably in this area and operates two large facilities for production and distribution. In 2006, plans to build a cement production plant on the Porte Marsh site were vigorously opposed by local residents and planning permission was refused by the council.

Aside from the completion of Lansdowne Park, smaller pockets of new housing were built. In May 2009, the 94-acre Beversbrook Sports Facility was opened. This facility is managed by Calne Town Council was built with £1.2 million funding from Hills Property, provided as part of the planning agreement for their King Edward Close development. The facility boasts fourteen age appropriate football pitches, one-ten wicket cricket square, an artificial cricket wicket, archery range, floodlit tennis courts and indoor facilities, including a badminton court.

=== Retail ===
Calne has Sainsbury's, Tesco and Iceland supermarkets, and an intermediate-sized Tesco store on the northern edge of the town and an intermediate- sized Asda Express on the southern edge. On Thursday, 19 February 2026, the long-awaited Lidl store opened on Oxford Road.

As part of the New Heart of Calne initiative, a section of the Phelps Parade was redeveloped in 2009, using part Cotswold stone and part red brick, a new glass roof section and roof lining.

== Arts and tourism ==
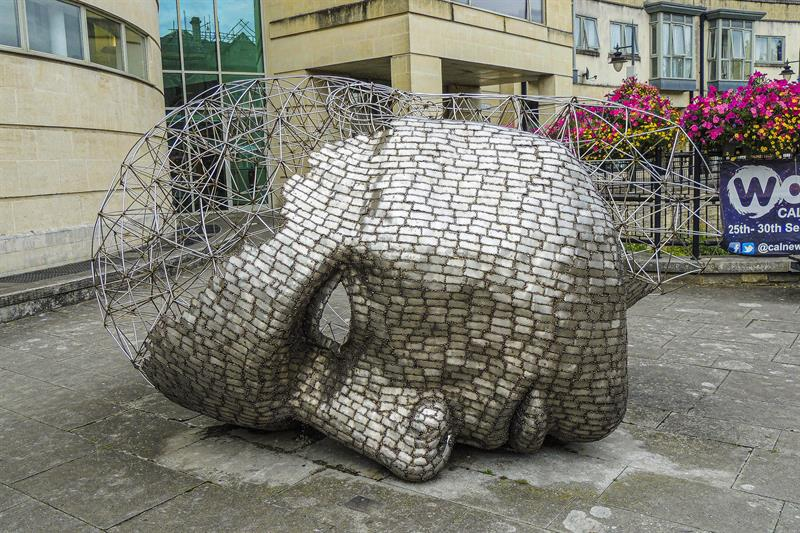
The Head, a Rick Kirby modernist sculpture in a central position outside Calne library on The Strand

The annual Calne Music & Arts Festival was established in 1975 and is run by a registered charity. It has only missed one festival year, in 2020.

In 2014, the town entered the South West in Bloom area of the Britain in Bloom competition and won a Gold Award for the first time. The award is judged on both the town council's floral displays and those of the community projects whose groups have entered in the 'It's Your Neighbourhood' category of the awards.

Calne is home to approximately twenty pieces of public art, ranging from bronze and ceramics to murals and mixed-media structures. These pieces have been documented, mapped and made available as a Public Art Trail for residents and tourists alike.

== Landmarks ==
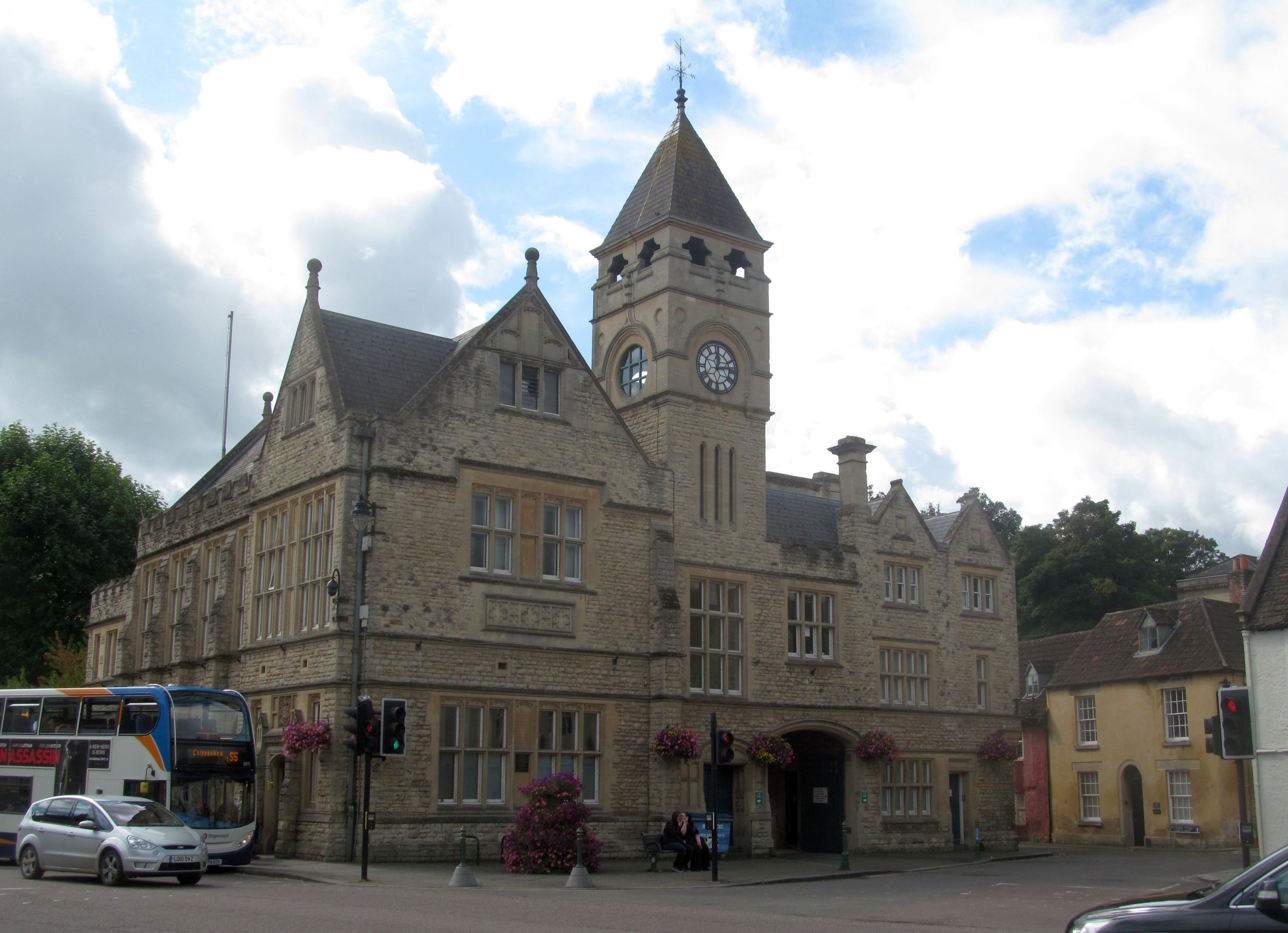
Calne Town Hall

Notable buildings in the town include St Mary's Church, Calne's only Grade I listed structure, an array of houses on The Green and Calne Town Hall.

An inn in the centre of the town – now the Lansdowne Strand Hotel – is a Grade II* listed building, dating in part from the 17th century and re-fronted in the 18th.

Of particular note is Calne Library which has won awards for its innovative design and was opened by the Queen in 2001.

Since the demolition of the Harris pork factory and the completion of the first phase of redevelopment/regeneration in 2001, Calne has seen Cotswold stone, similar to local limestone, being used together with smart red brickwork, formerly reserved for fine historical buildings.

== Transport and infrastructure ==
The town centre suffers traffic congestion, with the A4 through the town close to gridlock during rush hour, due to single-file traffic between Curzon Street and Wood Street, with eastbound traffic having priority. A northern bypass road (a re-routing of the A3102) was completed in 2000.

Calne is equidistant (12 mi or 19 km) from the M4 motorway at Junction 16 (Wootton Bassett/Swindon West) to the northeast of Calne, and the westbound M4 junction 17 just north of Chippenham to the northwest. The nearest main passenger airport is Bristol, 38 mi (61 km) to the southwest. The nearest railway stations are Chippenham, Melksham and Pewsey. Bus operators Stagecoach West, Faresaver and Swindon's Buses provide services to towns and cities such as Chippenham, Devizes, Marlborough, Swindon and Bath.

== Education ==
Bentley's School opened in the town in 1664 using an endowment left by John Bentley in 1662. In 1901 this was amalgamated with Calne Technical School as a school of science for boys aged 9–17, which became known as Calne County School and later Calne County Secondary School. Girls were admitted from 1903 and in 1908–09 new buildings were added to the nucleus of buildings dating from 1842. The school was later called the Bentley Grammar School. In 1957 it moved to a new building in the angle of the London and Melksham roads. In 1974, Wiltshire County Council closed the grammar school and the Fynemore Secondary Modern School in Silver Street and created a new school, the John Bentley Comprehensive School, on both sites. This was later called the John Bentley School, and in 2019 was renamed as the Kingsbury Green Academy. Until 1998 both sites were used. After the buildings in Silver Street were given up, new buildings were erected on the site of Bentley Grammar, and existing ones improved.

St Mary's School, Curzon Street, is an independent school for girls established in 1873.

Calne had other small schools, some based in houses, such as one in Curzon Street in which girls were trained for domestic service. Another example was a small boarding school for boys open in 1842 on the site of a former factory in Silver Street, called William Jacob's School. This was attended by Reg Birkett, the international sportsman, who played football and rugby for England in the 1870s, (Note: At the time his sports, football and rugby, had different codes regarding remuneration of players and profession, therefore he was described as dual-code.) and by Charlie Absolom who played cricket for the England cricket team in a Test match in 1879.

The nearest university is the University of Bath campus at Claverton Down in Bath, 19 mi (31 km) to the west. Bath Spa University lies 23 mi (37 km) away, between Bath and Bristol.

The closest further education institution is the Wiltshire College & University Centre site in Chippenham, 6 1/2 miles (10 km) away.

The town has five primary schools and one independent preparatory school.

- Fynamore Primary School – School Road
- Holy Trinity CofE School – Quemerford
- Marden Vale CofE (VC) Academy – William Street (formerly St Dunstan's)
- Priestley Primary School – Prince Charles Drive
- Saint Edmund's RC Primary School – Duncan Street
- St Margaret's Preparatory School – a mixed day preparatory school that shares the 25-acre (10-hectare) Curzon Street site with St Mary's

== Religious sites ==
=== Anglican ===
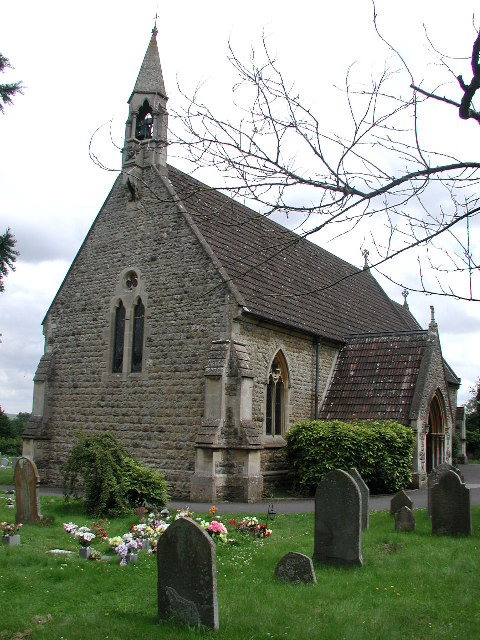
Holy Trinity, Quemerford

St Mary's church has a central position in the town and dates from the 12th century. The building was greatly expanded in the 14th and 15th centuries, and its tower rebuilt in the 17th. It is a Grade I listed building.

Holy Trinity church at Quemerford, on the London Road southwest of the town, was built in 1852–3. Its churchyard became the parish graveyard, as St Mary's was full.

=== Catholic ===
St Edmund's Catholic Church, Oxford Road, was built in 1962. The font has tiles from Stanley Abbey (which was visited by Saint Edmund Rich) and the church received stained glass from the demolished St Joseph's Church at RAF Lyneham.

=== Nonconformist ===
Calne has a long history of Nonconformism.

A Presbyterian chapel was built in Back Road c. 1695. The congregation became Unitarian after 1770, being influenced by Joseph Priestley who lived in the town from 1773 to 1780 and preached at the chapel. The chapel had been closed by the late 1830s and was re-used by the Primitive Methodists and later by the Salvation Army. It was demolished in the 1960s.

The Baptist church in Castle Street was built in the late 17th century, rebuilt in 1704 and again in 1817. The church continues in use. Particular Baptists built Zion chapel in 1836 on the street now called The Pippin; this too remains open, and is a feature of Calne's pedestrian precinct.

Wesleyan Methodists built a chapel in Back Road in 1811, and opened a larger church at Silver Street in 1867, which continues in use. Primitive Methodists used the former Unitarian chapel from the late 1830s, and moved to the former Wesleyan chapel in Back Road in 1887. In 1965 both congregations came together in the Silver Street building and the chapel in Back Road was later demolished.

The Free Church in Church Street was built in 1868 by a group who broke away from the parish church. The congregation is affiliated to the Fellowship of Independent Evangelical Churches.

There is an Evangelical church in Oxford Road. First built in the early 1930s, and rebuilt at a later date, this was an Open Brethren Gospel Hall until at least the late 1990s.

There is a non-conformist cemetery alongside the Curzon Street section of the A4 leading towards Chippenham. The cemetery was opened in 1867 and is available to people of any faith.

== Demography ==
At the 2021 Census, Calne parish had a population of 19,074. There were 19,732 in the built-up area, which extends further south to include those parts of Quemerford lying in Calne Without parish, as well as Stockley hamlet.

Earlier statistics for Calne parish are shown below. Figures from 1911 to 1961 are for the successor Metropolitan Borough which covered a slightly smaller area. In 2011 the population reached 17,274 living in 7,113 homes.

Population of Calne
Year	1801	1811	1821	1831	1841	1851	1881	1891
Population	3,767	3,547	4,549	4,795	5,128	5,117	5,194	
Year	1901	1911	1921	1931	1941	1951	1961	
Population		3,538	3,640	3,463	5,756	5,553	6,574	
Year	2001	2011	2021					
Population	13,606	17,274	19,074					

== Media ==
In local radio, BBC Radio Wiltshire and Heart West are supplemented by two Internet-only stations: Eartunes Radio (Calne's long-established community station), and White Horse Radio (music, advertiser-supported).

Local television news coverage is through BBC Points West and ITV News West Country, both Bristol-based.

== Governance ==
Following boundary changes which came into effect at the 2024 general election, the four electoral divisions covering Calne civil parish are split between two Westminster constituencies. Calne North, Calne Chilvester & Abberd, and Calne Central are within the Chippenham constituency, while Calne South (covering a southern part of the town, as well as Quemerford and a large rural area to the south) is part of Melksham and Devizes. The former is represented by Sarah Gibson and the latter by Brian Mathew, both Liberal Democrats.

At a parish level, Calne is run by Calne Town Council which has responsibility for allotments, play areas, open spaces, town events, cemeteries, tourist information and more. It elects 19 town councillors, from four wards.

Calne is within the area of Wiltshire Council, a unitary authority. It elects five of the authority's ninety-eight councillors. As of the 2025 Wiltshire Council election, Calne's councillors are:

Ward	Party	Member
Calne Central	Liberal Democrat	Ian Thorn
Calne Chilvester and Abberd	Reform	Augusta Urquhart-Nicholls
Calne North	Reform	Mike Sankey
Calne Rural	Conservative	Ashley O'Neill
Calne South	Liberal Democrat	Sam Pearce-Kearney

== Notable inhabitants ==
The first inhabitant of note was Edmund Rich (1175–1240), who became Archbishop of Canterbury. He was canonised and many educational establishments are named after him, notably St Edmund Hall, Oxford and St Edmund's College, Cambridge.

John Pym (1584–1643) lived in Calne. He was a leader of the Long Parliament and a prominent critic of Kings James I and then Charles I. He was one of the Five Members whose attempted arrest in 1642 sparked the Civil War.

Isaac Nichols, a transported convict who became the first postmaster of Sydney, New South Wales was born here in 1770.

The country estate of Bowood House, which dates from 1725, lies approximately 3 mi (5 km) southwest of the town. It is the family seat of the Marquess of Lansdowne; the current Marquess is Charles Petty-Fitzmaurice. It was at Bowood that Joseph Priestley discovered oxygen in 1774; there is a plaque in the town centre commemorating this. Jan Ingenhousz repeated Joseph Priestley's experiments and found it was sunlight which acted upon the plants to create oxygen (photosynthesis). There is a pavement display outside the Millennium Library in Calne in his honour.

Samuel Taylor Coleridge stayed from 1814 to 1816 as part of the Morgan household whilst writing his Biographia Literaria. A plaque on the house commemorates this visit.

Walter Goodall George (1858–1943) was an athlete who set numerous world records as an amateur and then as a professional. In one of his races, he set a mile record which was not surpassed for almost 30 years. George held more than 13 world records for running at the time and still holds a world record simply for holding the mile record longer than anyone else. There are two plaques in Calne to commemorate his life, one in front of the town hall and one at ground level just inside the recreation grounds.

Frederic Hicks Beaven (11 April 1855 – 22 January 1941) was Bishop of Mashonaland from 1911 – 1915 when his title was changed to Bishop of Southern Rhodesia, until his retirement in 1925.

Sarah Grand (1854–1943), a feminist activist and writer, settled in Calne in 1942 after her house in London was damaged by a German bomb. She died a year later on 12 May 1943, at age 88. She coined the phrase 'The New Woman' and advocated new rights for women, notably in marriage.

The composer Sir Michael Tippett lived in an isolated house on Derry Hill above Calne.

The singer-songwriter-author Julian Cope resided in nearby Yatesbury until 2006, and lived in Calne itself for some years before he moved with his family to the village.

The actor David Hemmings lived in the Old Mill in Calne for many years until his death in December 2003.

Clive Farahar, the books and manuscripts expert on the BBC's Antiques Roadshow, and his wife Sophie Dupré who is also a manuscript specialist, were residents in 1994.

Ellie Gould (2002–2019), a sixth form student from Calne, was stabbed to death on 3 May 2019 by Thomas Griffiths, a fellow student at her school who was also 17 at the time. Her murder led to "Ellie’s Law" which enables young offenders to be treated more like adults when convicted of serious crimes such as murder.

== Nearby places of interest ==
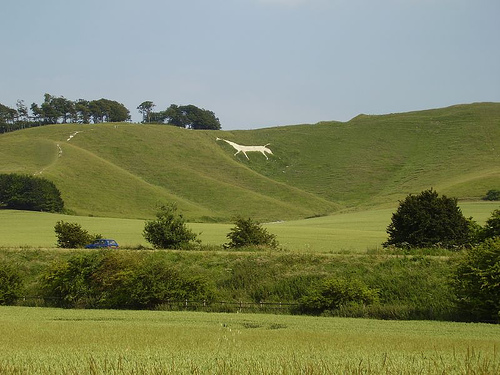
Cherhill White Horse seen from Cherhill village, 3 mi (5 km) east of Calne

In common with the surrounding villages, hotels cater to the following attractions:

- Cherhill White Horse – 3.4 mi (5.5 km) east of central Calne, carved into the south face of Cherhill Down in 1780, situated south of Cherhill village and clearly visible from the A4 Calne – Marlborough Road. Cherhill Down rises to 860 feet (260 metres).
- Lansdowne Monument – situated close to the summit of Cherhill Down, the 125 ft (38 m) stone needle provides views of Calne and the surrounding landscape. The mountains of South Wales and Cleeve Hill in the western Cotswolds can be seen on exceptionally clear days, as well as the cities of Bath and Bristol.
- Bowood House (including the 2/3 mi (1.1 km) Bowood Lake) – is 3.1 mi (5.0 km) to the west of Calne, accessible via the village of Derry Hill. Bowood House is privately owned by the Marquis and Marchioness of Lansdowne and is grade I listed.
- Avebury stone circle & Avenue (UNESCO World Heritage Site) – Europe's largest neolithic stone circle site is 7 1/2 mi (12.1 km) east of Calne on the A4361 route towards Wroughton.
- Silbury Hill, the largest neolithic structure in Europe, is situated 7 mi (11 km) east of the town on the A4 route 1/2 mi (800 m) east of Beckhampton.
- West Kennett Long Barrow – the 5,500-year-old neolithic long barrow/tomb is situated 7 1/4 mi (11.7 km) east of Calne, south of the A4 route east between Beckhampton and West Kennett.
- North Wessex Downs AONB – the range's highest summit is the Tan Hill-Milk Hill ridge near Allington, at 968 ft (295 m) above sea level, 9 mi (14 km) southeast of Calne. This area is popular with hill walkers, and several hills over 820 ft (250 m) high are situated adjacent to Calne.
- Salisbury Plain – the northernmost point of the plain is 12 mi (19 km) to the southeast of Calne, slightly to the southeast of Devizes.
- Stonehenge is 24 mi (39 km) south of the town.

Blackland Lakes is a large camping site on the southern edge of Calne which is popular with anglers and tourists alike. The 'lakes' themselves are in fact large angling pools.

== Sports clubs ==
=== Calne Town F.C. ===
Founded in 1886, Calne Town F.C. play in the Western Football League First Division at the tenth highest tier of the English league system. Their Bremhill View ground is on the north side of the town close to the A3102 bypass.

=== Calne R.F.C. ===
According to their website, the rugby club was formed in the late 1920s, in part due to the influx of Welsh to the area during the depression. The Junior Imperial League, forerunners of the Young Conservatives formed the club under the presidency of either Mr Drewett or Mr L. Taylor.

The team's first match was probably in Drewett ’s field where now stands Braemor Road. Their inaugural game against a Bath XV team was played on the Recreation Ground to which Calne returned in the late 1970s as a permanent home, which despite ground disputes and uncertainty – remains their home to date. It appears that a lack of local interest forced the club to fold in the late 1930s. In 1960 the club was re-formed as Old Bentlians; though it was not exclusively an "old boys" club it did use the pitches at Bentley Grammar School.

The club currently fields a 1st and 2nd XV, alternating home games on Saturdays, and also a junior team who play on Sundays.

=== Calne SMaRTT ===
Calne SMaRTT Running and Triathlon Team was formed in 2007. They organise an annual 10 km multi-terrain running race called the SMaRTT Smasher, on an out-and-back route along the cycle path towards Chippenham.

=== Calne Running Club ===
Formed in 1992 by Mike Tawn and Dave Balkwill, Calne Running Club has members of all abilities. They also organise the Compton Bassett 5-miler and Heddington 5k races yearly.

=== Basketball ===
As of 2011, due to the work of local sports enthusiast Shaun Preen, Calne is represented in the West of England Basketball Association (WEBBA), although home games are played at the Olympiad Leisure Centre, Chippenham, home of the 'Olympiad Flames' with which Calne basketball is officially affiliated. The club provides the local community the opportunity to participate in competitive basketball.

== Suburbs ==
Calne's suburbs and housing developments include Quemerford, Calne Marsh, Lansdowne Park, Curzon Park, Castlefields, Lickhill, Sand Pit Estate, Sands Farm Estate and Regent Park Estate.

Ordnance Survey maps published in 1959–61 show Quemerford village along the A4 east of the town, a few houses at Calne Marsh along the Swindon road on the northeastern outskirts, and Lickhill Farm standing in farmland to the northwest.

== Twin towns ==
Calne is twinned with the towns of:

- Charlieu in France
- Eningen in Germany
- Caln Township, Pennsylvania
