= Bremhill =

Village in Wiltshire, England

Coordinates: 51.457°N 2.030°W

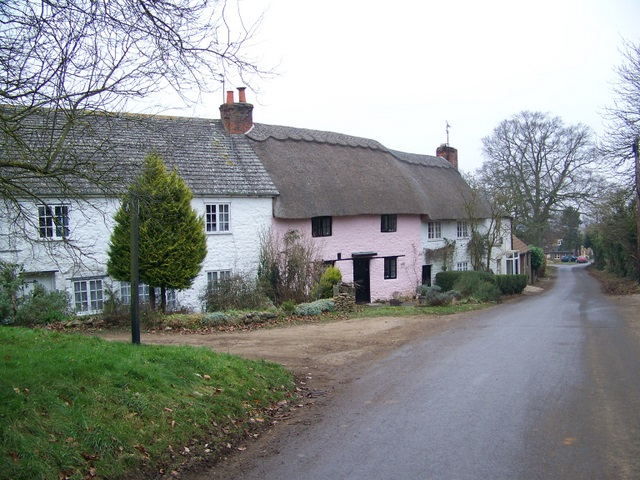

- Location within Wiltshire
- Population: 967 (in 2021)
- OS grid reference: ST980731
- Unitary authority: Wiltshire
- Ceremonial county: Wiltshire
- Region: South West
- Country: England
- Sovereign state: United Kingdom
- Post town: Chippenham
- Postcode district: SN15
- Post town: Calne
- Postcode district: SN11
- Dialling code: 01249
- Police: Wiltshire
- Fire: Dorset and Wiltshire
- Ambulance: South Western
- UK Parliament: Chippenham
- Website: Parish Council

Bremhill is a village and civil parish in Wiltshire, England. The village is about 1.6 miles (2.6 km) northwest of Calne and 4 miles (6.4 km) east of Chippenham. The name originates from 'Bramble hill'. In 2021 the parish had a population of 967.

== Geography ==
Bremhill civil parish is a rural area which stretches northeast some 5 miles (8 km) from the eastern boundary of the Chippenham built-up area. It includes the hamlets of Avon, Bremhill Wick, Charlcutt, East Tytherton, Low Bridge, Foxham, Spirthill, Stanley, Tytherton Lucas and West End, and part of the hamlet of Ratford.

The River Avon forms part of the western boundary of the parish, where it is joined by the Marden which crosses the parish from the south. The parish has many smaller tributaries of the Avon, including Pudding Brook, which joins the Marden south of Tytherton Lucas; the Cade Burna, which gives its name to Cadenham Manor; and the Cat Brook.

Bencroft Hill Meadows, in the south of the parish, is a biological Site of Special Scientific Interest.

== History ==
Æthelstan gave land at Bremhill to Malmesbury Abbey c. 935. At the time of the 1086 Domesday Book, a large population of 79 households was recorded in Breme in the ancient hundred of Chippenham.

Stanley Abbey moved to a site 2 miles (3.2 km) southwest of Bremhill in 1154 and was dissolved in 1536. Stanley is also the site of an early fulling mill, recorded in 1189.

The pathway known since the 15th century as Maud Heath's Causeway connects Bremhill with Langley Burrell, near Chippenham.

Bremhill Manor is a farmhouse from c. 1820 with a late medieval barn.

The Wilts & Berks Canal, opened in full in 1810, passed through the parish from southwest to northeast, with a junction near Stanley for its branch to Calne, which followed the Marden valley. Built largely to handle coal from the Somerset Coalfield, the canal saw a decline in traffic in the second half of the century and had fallen into disuse by the end of the century. Partial collapse of the Stanley Aqueduct over the Marden made the canal unusable and it was formally abandoned in 1914.

In 1863 a railway, the Chippenham and Calne branch line, crossed the parish, also following the Marden valley, with an intermediate stop at Stanley Bridge Halt. The line was busy in the first half of the 20th century with goods to and from the Harris pork processing factory at Calne, and later with RAF personnel. Usage declined in the 1960s and the line was closed in 1965.

== Religious sites ==
Stanley Abbey flourished between 1151 and 1536.

=== Parish church ===
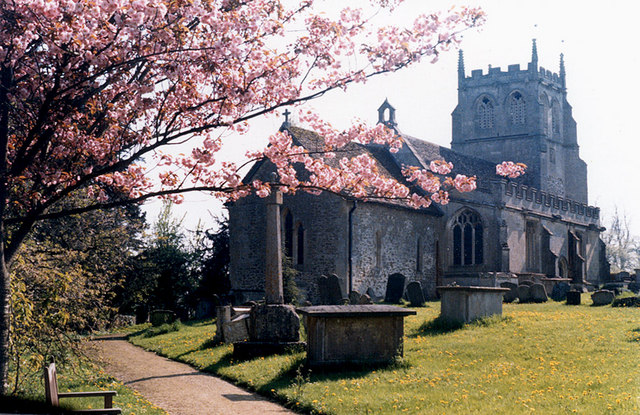
St Martin's church

The Anglican parish church of St Martin at Bremhill has Saxon origins and dates from c. 1200. The tower is probably 13th-century, with 15th-century renovation. The church was restored and the pews modified by Manners & Gill of Bath in 1849–1851, preserving the medieval pew end carvings, and William Butterfield altered the west window in 1862–63. In 1960 the building was designated as Grade I listed.

William Bowles (1762–1850), poet, was Vicar of Bremhill from 1804. He made alterations to the vicarage (a 15th-century building) in the Gothic style around 1820. Today the parish is part of the Marden Vale benefice, alongside St Mary and Holy Trinity at Calne, and the churches of Blackland, Derry Hill and Foxham.

=== Other churches ===
Elsewhere in the parish are two more Anglican churches, both Grade II* listed. St Nicholas at Tytherton Lucas is a chapel of ease belonging to St Andrew's, Chippenham, dating from the 13th century and rebuilt in 1802. The church bell is from the 12th century, making it one of the oldest in the county.

At Foxham, the church of St John the Baptist was built in 1878–81 by William Butterfield.

A Moravian church at East Tytherton is also Grade II* listed, along with its adjoining manse and former schoolroom. The house was bought by preacher John Cennick in 1742 and the Moravian community was founded in 1745; the manse and chapel were rebuilt in 1792–3 and the schoolroom added 1793–4. As of 2016 the church is still in use.

Two Wesleyan Methodist chapels, at Spirthill (1825) and Foxham (1855) are no longer in use.

== Schools ==
A small school was built next to the church at Bremhill in 1846, replacing an earlier school provided by the Marquess of Lansdowne. In the 20th century it became a voluntary controlled school; it closed in 1969 owing to low pupil numbers.

At East Tytherton a girls' boarding school was built c. 1745 near the Moravian church; from 1794 the school occupied a new building adjacent to the rebuilt church. This school closed in 1931. Also at East Tytherton, a British school opened in 1871 and became a County school in the 20th century, later named Maud Heath School. Pupil numbers declined from the 1950s and the school closed at the end of 2005. In 2016 the building was an activity centre for Girl Guides.

Foxham had a church school, provided before 1846 by the Marchioness of Lansdowne, which closed in 1930.

== Notable people ==
- Gabriel Pleydell (died c. 1591), owned the manor of Bremhill
- Sir George Hungerford (1637–1712), lived at Cadenham House, Bremhill
- William Lisle Bowles (1762–1850), vicar of Bremhill from 1804 to 1845
- Henry Drury, vicar of Bremhill from 1845
- Edward Eddrup (1823–1905), vicar of Bremhill from 1868 to 1905
