= Tytherton =

Tytherton may refer to

- East Tytherton, a hamlet in the parish of Bremhill, Wiltshire, England
- Tytherton Lucas, a hamlet in the parish of Bremhill, Wiltshire, England
