= Kellaways =

Village in Wiltshire, England

Coordinates: 51.480°N 2.073°W

Tytherton Kellaways
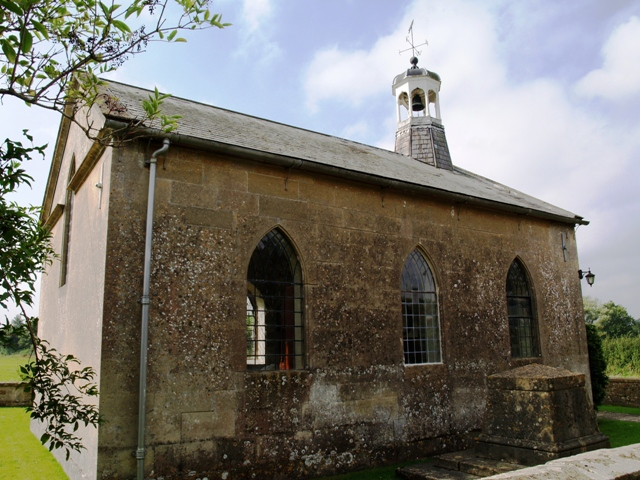
- St Giles' church

- Location within Wiltshire
- OS grid reference: ST9516275497
- Civil parish: Langley Burrell Without
- Unitary authority: Wiltshire
- Ceremonial county: Wiltshire
- Region: South West
- Country: England
- Sovereign state: United Kingdom
- Post town: Chippenham
- Postcode district: SN15 4
- Dialling code: 01249
- Police: Wiltshire
- Fire: Dorset and Wiltshire
- Ambulance: South Western
- UK Parliament: South Cotswolds

Kellaways, also known as Tytherton Kellaways, is a village and former ecclesiastical parish in the present-day civil parish of Langley Burrell Without and ceremonial county of Wiltshire, England. Its nearest town is Chippenham, which lies 2.5 miles (4.0 km) southwest from the hamlet. Historically, the name was sometimes given as Gallows.

The parish was formed on 1 April 1895 as a replacement for Avon parish. On 1 April 1934 the parish was abolished and its area was added to Langley Burrell Without. In 1931 the parish had a population of 37.

The manor house is from the 17th century and is Grade II* listed.

There was a water mill on the River Avon, marked as disused on a 1959 map. The present building, now a house, is from the late 17th and 18th centuries; nearby stands the mill-owner's house of c. 1800.

The small church of St Giles was built c. 1800, in ashlar with a slate roof and an octagonal cupola. The building replaced an earlier structure which was attached to the mill, first recorded in 1304. Today the ecclesiastical parish of Tytherton Kellaways is part of the Draycot benefice.

== See also ==
- Kellaways – West Tytherton, River Avon SSSI, Wiltshire, a site of special geological interest
