= Charlcutt =

Hamlet in Wiltshire, England

Coordinates: 51.478°N 2.024°W

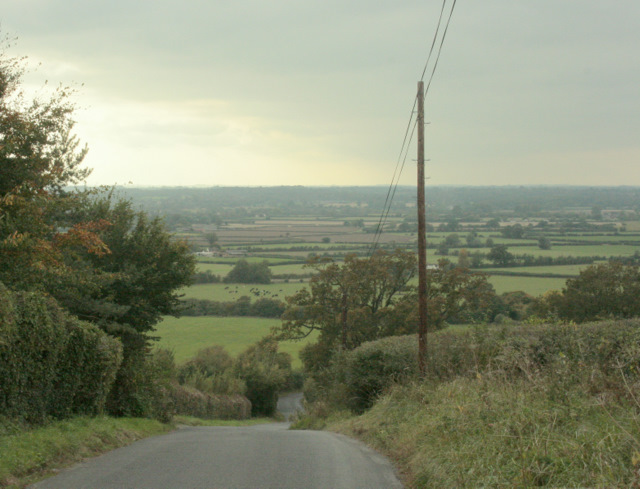
- View from the hill at Charlcutt

- Location within Wiltshire
- OS grid reference: ST984754
- Civil parish: Bremhill
- Unitary authority: Wiltshire
- Ceremonial county: Wiltshire
- Region: South West
- Country: England
- Sovereign state: United Kingdom
- Post town: CALNE
- Postcode district: SN11
- Dialling code: 01249
- Police: Wiltshire
- Fire: Dorset and Wiltshire
- Ambulance: South Western
- UK Parliament: Chippenham

Charlcutt is a hamlet in the county of Wiltshire, England, 3 miles (4.8 km) northwest of Calne. It is part of the civil parish of Bremhill.

Charlcutt is home to some twenty households spread over a distance of one mile along the ridge of the hill. Unusually, Charlcutt House is at the bottom of the hill, beneath the other dwellings. There are no religious buildings, with the nearest chapel a mile away in neighbouring Spirthill (now converted into a home).
