= Sarum College =

Theological college in Salisbury, England

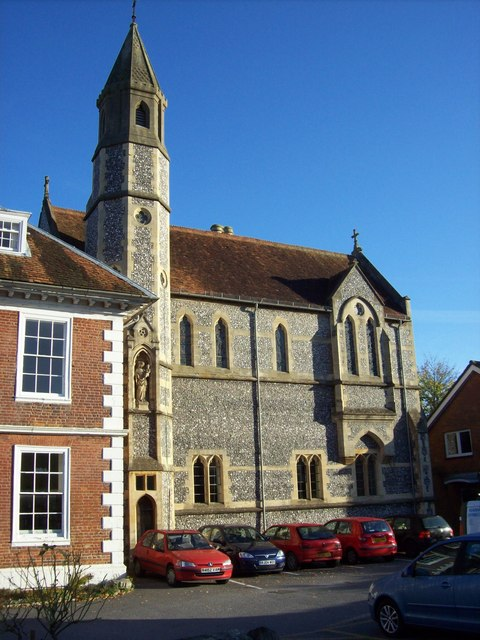
- Motto: Learning to nourish the human spirit
- Established: 1995 (previously 1860 – Salisbury Theological College; 1971 – Salisbury & Wells Theological College)
- Affiliations: University of Winchester; Durham University
- Principal: James Woodward
- Location: Salisbury, Wiltshire, United Kingdom
- Website: www.sarum.ac.uk

Sarum College is a centre of theological learning in Salisbury, England. The college was established in 1995 and sits within the cathedral close on the north side of Salisbury Cathedral.

The Sarum College education programme ranges from short courses to postgraduate level, including certificates, diplomas and master's degrees courses in Christian Spirituality, Theology, Imagination and Culture.

The onsite theological library holds a collection of more than 35,000 books and journals and is open to students and the general public.

The college is a meeting and conference centre for groups, organisations and businesses and welcomes individuals for private stays, including B&B, study breaks, sabbaticals and retreats.

== History ==
The history of theological study begins with Saint Osmund and the completion of the first cathedral at Old Sarum in 1092. After Old Sarum was abandoned in favour of New Sarum (or Salisbury, as it came to be known) and the new cathedral was built in the 1220s, several colleges were established.

There is a long-standing tradition that there was a medieval school of theology on the site of No. 19. It was at this time that Salisbury nearly became a university city to rival Oxford and Cambridge, but history took a different turn.

The main building at the front of the site was built in 1677 and has long been attributed to Sir Christopher Wren for Francis Hill, a distinguished London lawyer and deputy recorder for Salisbury. He chose a particularly striking site, at the north end of Bishop's Walk, facing directly down to the Bishop's Palace (now the Cathedral School). The house remained in the Hill family until the end of the 18th century. In February 1952 the main building was designated as a Grade I listed building.

=== Establishment ===
Walter Kerr Hamilton, Bishop of Salisbury, established Salisbury Theological College in 1860 – buying the house (then No. 87) from Charlotte Wyndham – and the first students arrived in January 1861.

In the 1870s the college expanded, with the addition of a residential wing (the Butterfield Wing) to provide accommodation for students, and then a chapel. A donation of £4,750 was given by Sidney Lear, sister of the archdeacon, for the new buildings. The extensions were designed by William Butterfield, one of the foremost church architects of his time and best known for Keble College, Oxford. The chapel was consecrated in 1881.

=== 20th century ===
Eight students of the college were killed in the First World War (1914–18) and a memorial in the chapel records their names.

In 1937 further extensions were added – consisting of study bedrooms for students, a new library (now the common room) – designed by William Randoll Blacking. These rooms are now known as the Baker Wing.

During the Second World War (1939–45) the college was taken over by the women of the Auxiliary Territorial Service and Queen Mary paid them a visit. Apparently the creepers which covered the front of the building were hastily removed, as the Queen did not like them.

=== Merger ===
In October 1971 the two theological colleges of Salisbury and Wells merged. The Wells students came to No. 19 and the Salisbury and Wells Theological College was formed. The arrival of extra students required more space and two extensions were built: a three-storey block of flats and study bedrooms at the eastern end of the Butterfield building (the East Wing) and a new chapel, refectory and library at the northern end.

=== Present ===
In 1994 the Salisbury and Wells College closed, and the following year Sarum College was established on the same Salisbury site to provide a place of ecumenical theological education. It also provided ministerial training through the Southern Theological Education and Training Scheme (STETS), which closed in 2015 after the college absorbed its functions.

== List of principals ==
Sarum College

- James Woodward (2015 to present)
- Keith Lamdin (2008 to 2015)
- Tim Macquiban (2003 to 2008)
- Bruce Duncan (1995 to 2003)

Salisbury Theological College

- Edward Eddrup (from 1861)
- John Daubeny (1868 to 1878)
- Robert Moberly (1878 to 1880)
- E. B. Ottley (1880 to 1883)
- Benjamin Whitefoord (1883 to 1907)
- Robert Abbott (1907 to 1913)
- Charles Tunnacliff Dimont (1913 to 1936)
- Brian Burrowes (1937 to 1950)
- Harold Wilson (1965 to October 1971)

Salisbury & Wells Theological College

- Harold Wilson (October 1971 to 1973)
- Reginald Askew (1973 to 1987)
- Philip Crowe (1988 to 1995)
