= Tytherton Lucas =

Hamlet in Wiltshire, England

Coordinates: 51.468°N 2.074°W

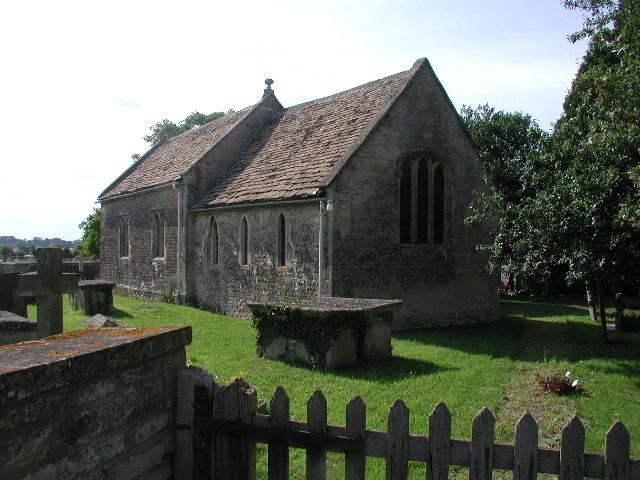
- St Nicholas' church

- Location within Wiltshire
- OS grid reference: ST950743
- Civil parish: Bremhill
- Unitary authority: Wiltshire
- Ceremonial county: Wiltshire
- Region: South West
- Country: England
- Sovereign state: United Kingdom
- Post town: Chippenham
- Postcode district: SN15 3
- Dialling code: 01249
- Police: Wiltshire
- Fire: Dorset and Wiltshire
- Ambulance: South Western
- UK Parliament: Chippenham

Tytherton Lucas is a hamlet in the civil parish of Bremhill in the ceremonial county of Wiltshire, England. Its nearest town is Chippenham, which lies approximately 2 miles (3.2 km) south-west from the hamlet. The River Avon passes to the west, and the Cat Brook and Cade Burma streams flow just to the north.

== History ==
Historically, Tytherton Lucas belonged to the Hundred of Chippenham. The hamlet is documented in the Domesday Book of 1086, which documents that Burghelm (Borel) held two hides of land and a William Hard owned four hides in Terintone or Tedlinton. In the 14th century, William Percehay, John Turpyn and Walter Scudamore held the Tytherton Knight's Fee, serving the Crown with feudal obligations. In around 1150, the tithes of Tytherton and Chippenham were granted to Monkton Farleigh Priory by Empress Matilda.

By 1650, the local chapel had fallen into a dilapidated state, and the parishioners opted to form a new independent parish with East Tytherton, Bremhill and Langley Burrell.

== Landmarks ==
The Grade II* listed Anglican church of St Nicholas is a chapel of ease belonging to St Andrew's, Chippenham, dating from the 13th century and rebuilt in 1802. The church bell is from the 12th century, making it one of the oldest in the county.

Manor Farmhouse, from the 17th century, is also Grade II* listed. Other farms are from the 17th and 19th centuries.
