= Christian Schiller =

British army officer

Louis Christian Schiller CBE MC (20 September 1895, in New Barnet, London – 11 February 1976, Kenton, London), known as Christian Schiller, was HM Inspector of Schools in the United Kingdom and a promoter of progressive ideas in primary education.

== Education ==
Schiller was educated at Tyttenhanger Lodge Preparatory School near St. Albans and then at Gresham's School, Holt, from 1909 to 1914. He became head boy there, excelled at sprinting and won a mathematics scholarship to Sidney Sussex College, Cambridge. His education was interrupted by World War I, after which he took up his place at Cambridge University and briefly read Mathematics there from 1919 to 1920. He later studied for a Teachers Diploma at the London Day Training College (1923–1924).

== War service ==
Before Schiller's intended arrival at Cambridge, World War I broke out and he volunteered for the army. He was commissioned into the Lincolnshire Regiment and spent most of the war on active service. He took part in the Battle of Mons, and in 1917 after being wounded in action received the Military Cross.

== Career ==
Leaving Cambridge without a degree, between 1920 and 1923 Schiller taught Maths at the progressive Rendcomb School, a secondary school in Gloucestershire. He joined a committee of the Mathematical Association concerned with the teaching of Geometry. In 1924, after taking his Teacher's Diploma, he was appointed an Assistant Inspector of Schools by the Board of Education and began his career in its Whitehall offices.

In 1925, he moved to Liverpool, where he rose to become District Inspector of Schools. From 1937 to 1946 he worked in Worcestershire. In 1946, following the Education Act 1944, he was appointed as the Ministry of Education's first Staff Inspector for Primary Education, based in London. He ran courses for primary teachers, often with Robin Tanner, and promoted progressive ideals and practice.

In 1955 he retired from the Ministry and took up a post as senior lecturer at the Institute of Education to teach a course in primary education. This continued from 1956 to 1963, and his students included Leonard Marsh, Arthur Razzell and John Coe. After his formal retirement in 1963, Schiller continued to lecture and advise on education and also acted as an external examiner. He was appointed CBE in the 1955 Birthday Honours.

He sat on the Plowden Committee at Goldsmiths' College and in the early 1970s influenced its new Postgraduate Primary Course.

== Publications ==
Schiller published many articles on education. He also planned a book, but it was unfinished at his death. The National Association for Primary Education has published a collection of his papers 'Christian Schiller – in his own words'.

== Family ==
On 19 August 1925, Schiller married Lyndall Handover (born 18 April 1900, Acton, London), who was educated at Godolphin and Latymer School, the Royal Holloway College, University of London, and the London Day Training College for a Teachers' Diploma (1923–1924), where she met Schiller. She taught English and French, but on her marriage gave up teaching. They had three daughters, Gerda, Meryl and Lyris, and one son, Russell.

== Collections ==
Schiller's personal papers are held in the Institute of Education (IOE) Archives. The material was transferred to the IOE in 1998. The archive contains material relating to Schiller's work, along with the papers of his wife Lyndall Schiller and papers belonging to two of his students.
