= Young Gallery =

The Young Gallery
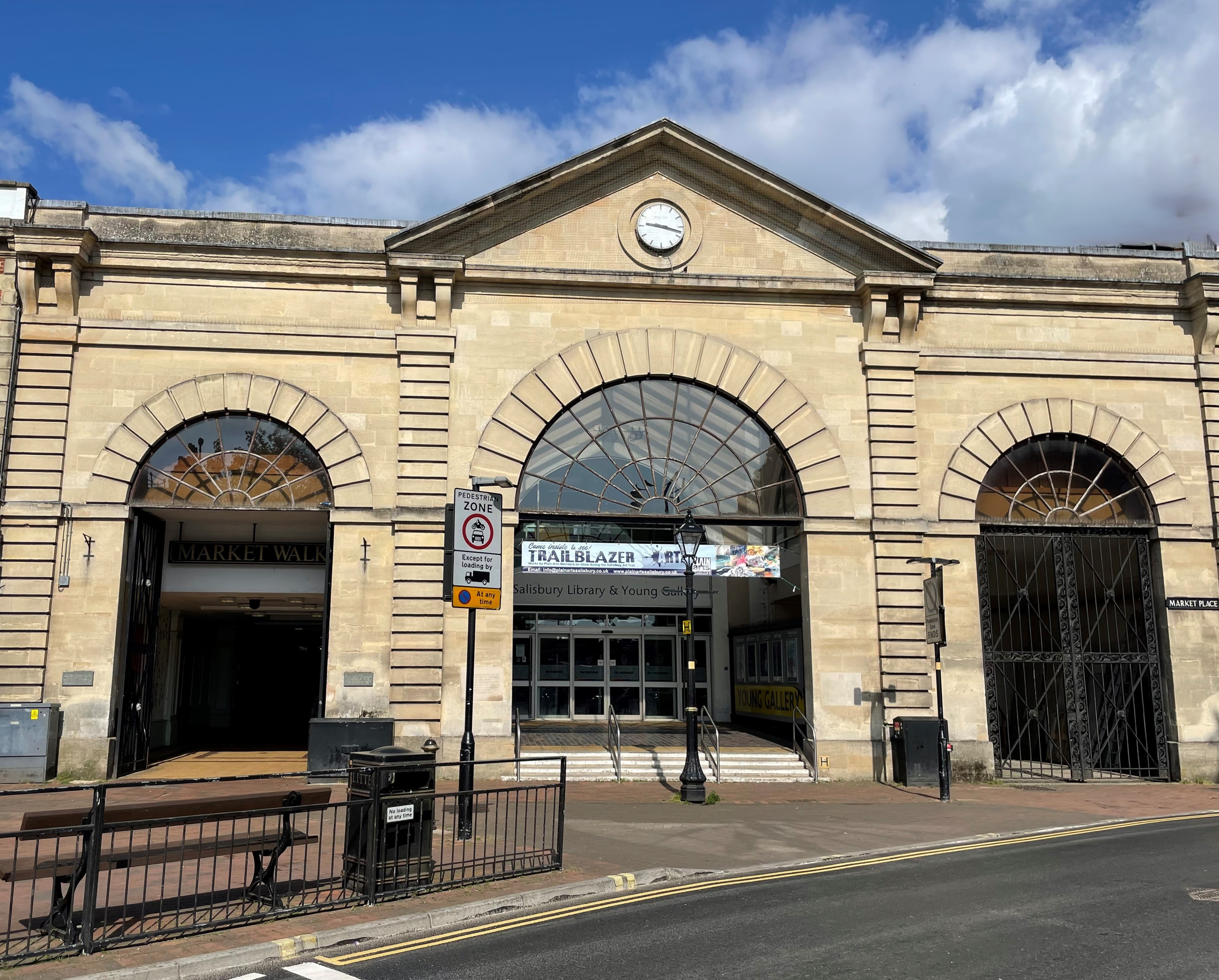
- Exterior of The Young Gallery in Salisbury
- Location: Market Place, Salisbury, Wiltshire SP1 1BL, England
- Coordinates: 51.06974°N 1.79678°W
- Type: Art museum
- Key holdings: Edgar Barclay, John Creasey, Mick Maslen, Robin Tanner, and Edwin Young collections
- Collections: Artworks
- Collection size: 4,000
- Website: www.younggallerysalisbury.org.uk

The Young Gallery is an art gallery in Salisbury, Wiltshire, England. The gallery's collections include those from Edgar Barclay, John Creasey, Mick Maslen, Robin Tanner, and Edwin Young. It also has temporary exhibitions.

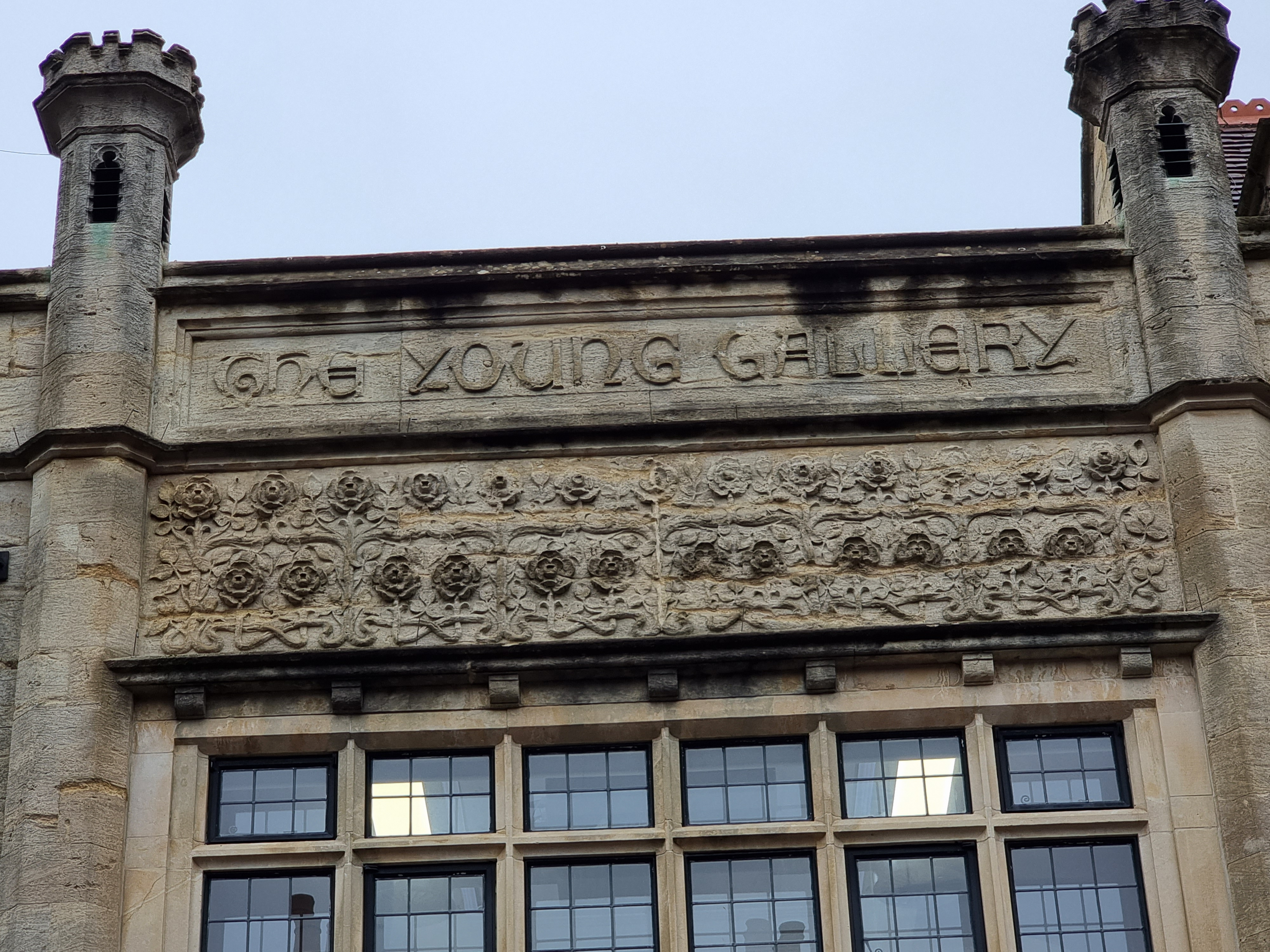
The name frieze for the original Young Gallery, commissioned in 1913, and later moved to the new Salisbury Library in 1975

The gallery is a free art museum in central Salisbury. It is housed on the first floor of Salisbury Library and holds a collection of over 4,000 objects, including books, paintings, prints, photographs, and sculptures. The collection started with over 300 watercolour paintings of scenes of Salisbury and the surrounding area by Edwin Young, after whom the gallery is named. The gallery has since acquired watercolours by artists of various periods. In addition, the gallery has around 2,000 books in more than 20 languages, as well as book jacket designs, manuscripts, and ephemera related to the crime/thriller novelist John Creasey in the 1970s. The collection has expanded to include a collection of artwork and prints. It contains original works by Edgar Barclay, William Goldsmith, Robin Tanner, as well as prints by the English artists John Constable, David Hockney, Henry Moore, and J. M. W. Turner.

In 2024, the former Edwin Young Collection and the John Creasey Museum were merged to allow the Young Gallery to renew its accreditation with Arts Council England.
