= East Tytherton =

Hamlet in Wiltshire, England

Coordinates: 51.473°N 2.051°W

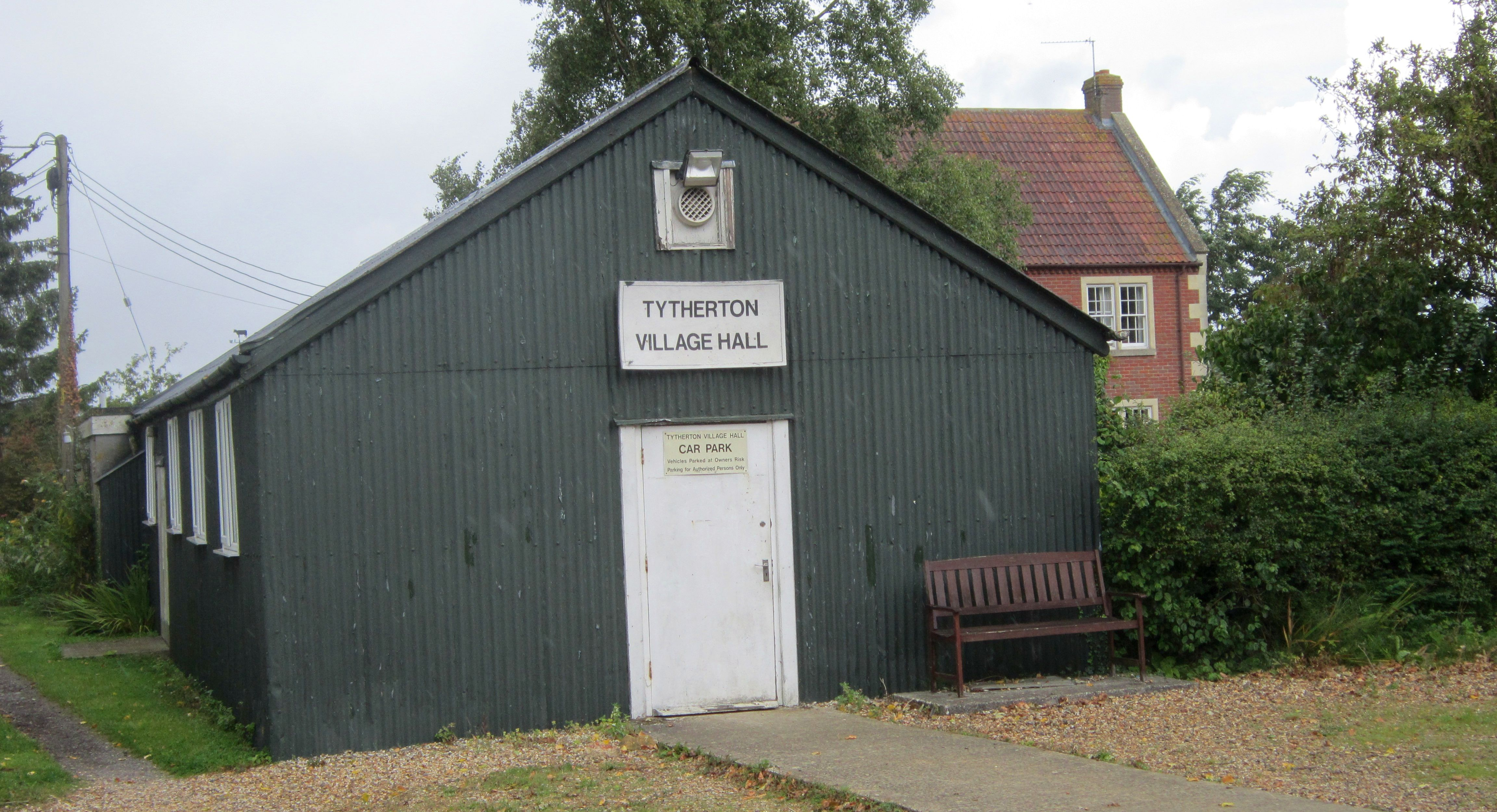
- Village hall

- Location within Wiltshire
- OS grid reference: ST966749
- Civil parish: Bremhill
- Unitary authority: Wiltshire
- Ceremonial county: Wiltshire
- Region: South West
- Country: England
- Sovereign state: United Kingdom
- Post town: Chippenham
- Postcode district: SN15
- Dialling code: 01249
- Police: Wiltshire
- Fire: Dorset and Wiltshire
- Ambulance: South Western
- UK Parliament: Chippenham

East Tytherton is a hamlet in the civil parish of Bremhill in the ceremonial county of Wiltshire, England. Its nearest town is Chippenham, which lies approximately 2.7 miles (4.3 km) south-west from the hamlet.

== Geography ==
East Tytherton is located on a minor road in a valley some 2.7 miles (4.3 km) northeast of Chippenham and a similar distance northwest of Calne, within the civil parish of Bremhill. It has a rectangular village green around which the grey stone manor and the other residences are clustered. One timber-framed house has painted brick walls and a corrugated iron roof.

== History ==
A house at East Tytherton was bought by preacher John Cennick in 1742 and a Moravian community was founded in 1745; a chapel, manse and church cottage were built for the community. Pevsner describes the Moravian settlement and "..the School House, dated 1785.." built behind the existing chapel buildings as The Single Sisters' Choir House. Early residents included Leonora Carr and 4 other ex-slaves from Antigua who lived at the Single Sisters' House in the early 19th century. Leonora is buried in the graveyard behind the house. The Sisters' Choir House was subsequently converted into a boarding school, primarily for the children of Moravian missionaries. One pupil was Thermutis Coleman whose son (Rev. Robert Francis Kilvert) wrote the descriptions of local life which were later published and broadcast on BBC Radio as "Kilvert's Diaries". The Sisters' Choir House has been a private residence (Kellaways House) since WW2.

The manse and chapel were rebuilt between 1792 and 1793, and a schoolroom was added in 1793–4. The chapel, manse and former schoolroom are red brick buildings with ashlar dressings and stone slate roofs, and are Grade II* listed. The chapel is a single-storey structure with a pair of two-storey houses attached at either end. The manse has a timber bell-cot at the east end. As of 2016, the church is still in use.

The Moravian school was built to house fifty pupils but at one time there were seventy. The school closed in 1931. Nearby, a British school opened in 1871 and became a County school in the 20th century, later named Maud Heath School (a reference to Maud Heath's Causeway). Pupil numbers declined from the 1950s and the school closed at the end of 2005. In 2016 the building was an activity centre for Girl Guides.
