= Langley Burrell =

Village in Wiltshire, England

Coordinates: 51.476°N 2.098°W

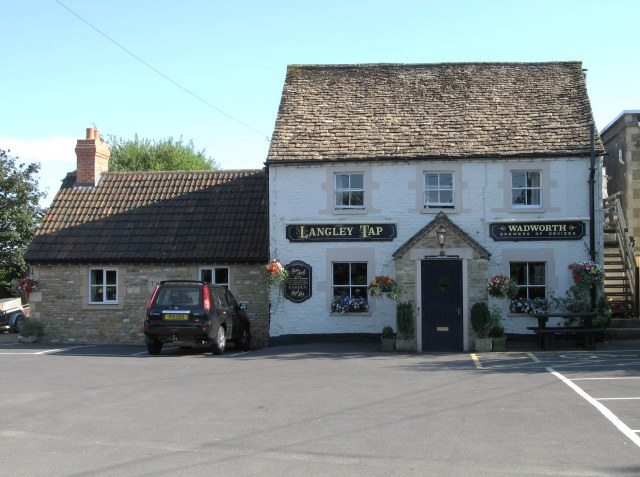
- The Langley Tap, Langley Burrell

- Location within Wiltshire
- Population: 375 (in 2011)
- OS grid reference: ST933752
- Civil parish: Langley Burrell Without
- Unitary authority: Wiltshire
- Ceremonial county: Wiltshire
- Region: South West
- Country: England
- Sovereign state: United Kingdom
- Post town: Chippenham
- Postcode district: SN15
- Dialling code: 01249
- Police: Wiltshire
- Fire: Dorset and Wiltshire
- Ambulance: South Western
- UK Parliament: South Cotswolds
- Website: Parish Council

Langley Burrell is a village in the civil parish of Langley Burrell Without, just north of Chippenham, Wiltshire, England. It is the largest settlement in the parish, which includes the hamlets of Peckingell (south of the village) and Kellaways (to the east, on the opposite bank of the Bristol Avon).

== History ==
The Domesday Book of 1068 recorded a settlement of 22 households at Langefel, tenanted by Borel.

Samuel Ashe, a lawyer and later member of parliament, bought the Langley Burrell estate in 1657. The family built Langley House and the estate continues to be owned by the Scott-Ashe family; circa 2010 the new owners of the house offered it for sale for £5 million.

Robert Ashe built a school in 1844, on the main road west of the village, later described by Nikolaus Pevsner as "earliest Victorian Gothic". In 1858 there were between 30 and 40 pupils, and after enlargement in 1902 there were 55. Children of all ages attended until 1953, and from 1956 those over 11 went to Hardenhuish School in Chippenham. Owing to low pupil numbers the school closed in 1975, with pupils transferring to East Tytherington.

The Great Western Main Line (the Wootton Bassett to Chippenham section of the London-Bristol route) was built across the parish, opening in 1841. The main road through the parish was the A420, which ran from Bristol to Swindon and Oxford. Following the building of the M4 motorway this section was reclassified as the B4069.

In 1891 the parish of Langley Burrell had a population of 1445. In 1894 the parish was abolished and split, with the rural part going to form Langley Burrell Without and the part in Chippenham Municipal Borough going to form Langley Burrell Within.

== Parish church ==
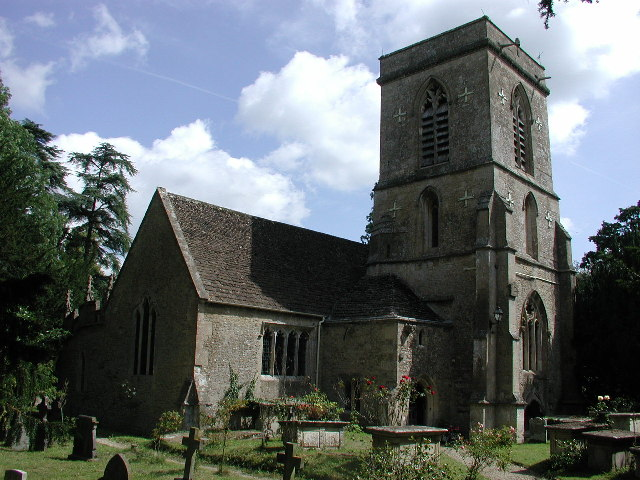
St Peter's, Langley Burrell

The Church of England parish church of St Peter dates from the early 13th century; the earliest part is the three-bay north arcade. The west end, south porch, chancel and chancel arch are c. 1300. From the same century are the three-stage tower and a pair of sedilia. In the 15th century the church was re-roofed and a small southeast chapel was added.

Interior improvements were made in the 1860s and 70s while Robert Kilvert was rector: an ornate font was added, the gallery removed, and the pews replaced. Careful restoration was supervised by C.E. Ponting (chancel, 1890) and H.W. Brakspear (nave and north aisle, 1898). Pevsner writes "... a delightful church, not neglected, but also not over-restored."

The tower has six bells, four from the 17th century and one from the 18th. The church was designated as Grade I listed in 1960. Today the church is part of the Greenways group, alongside two Chippenham churches – St Paul's and St Nicholas'.

== Notable buildings ==
The small Church of St Giles at Kellaways was erected c. 1800 to replace an earlier building, first recorded in 1304.

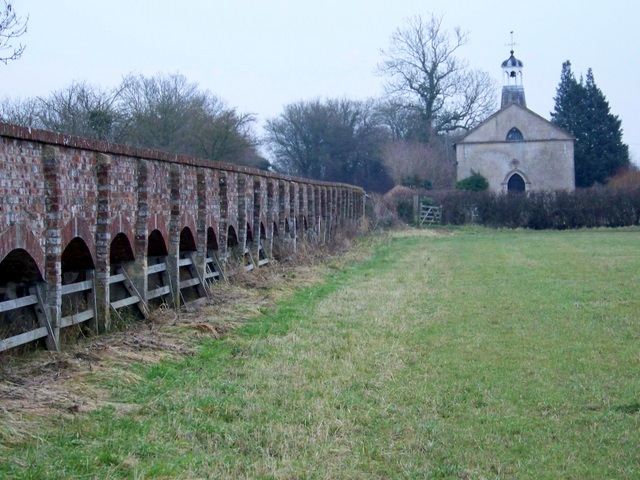
Maud Heath's Causeway and St Giles' Church, Kellaways

Wick Hill in the parish is one of the termini of Maud Heath's Causeway, a pathway which provided a route to Chippenham market, maintained by a charity established by bequest of Maud Heath in 1474. The arches which carry the path over the floodplain of the Avon – built 1812, largely rebuilt in the 20th century – are Grade II* listed.

Also Grade II* listed:

- The 17th century manor house at Kellaways.
- The Georgian parsonage. This was for many years the home of the Rev. Robert Kilvert, father of the diarist Francis Kilvert, who from 1863 to 1864 and 1872 to 1876 was curate to his father here.
- Langley House, 1780, ashlar faced, half a mile northwest of the village, near the church; replaced an earlier manor house of which the stable block survives.

== In literature ==
Heather Tanner, author, and her artist husband Robin lived nearby at Kington Langley. In their 1939 book Wiltshire Village is a thinly disguised description of village life presented as the fictional village of Kington Borel.
