= Kington Langley =

Village in Wiltshire, England

Coordinates: 51.492°N 2.108°W

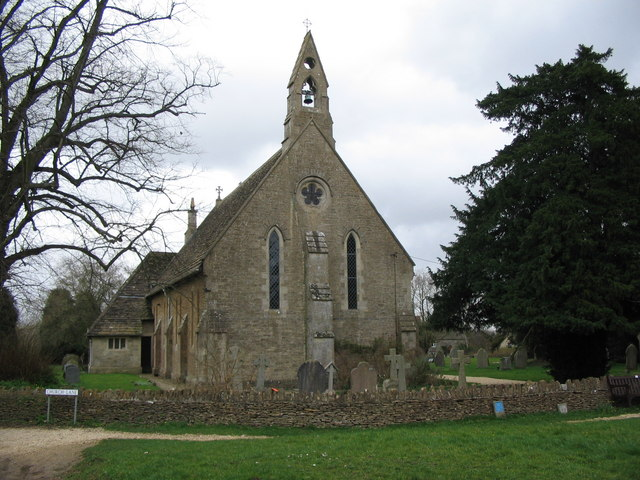
- St Peter's parish church, Middle Common

- Location within Wiltshire
- Population: 841 (in 2011)
- OS grid reference: ST926770
- Unitary authority: Wiltshire
- Ceremonial county: Wiltshire
- Region: South West
- Country: England
- Sovereign state: United Kingdom
- Post town: Chippenham
- Postcode district: SN15
- Dialling code: 01249
- Police: Wiltshire
- Fire: Dorset and Wiltshire
- Ambulance: South Western
- UK Parliament: South Cotswolds
- Website: Parish Council

Kington Langley is a village and civil parish about 2 miles (3.2 km) north of Chippenham in Wiltshire, England. The parish includes the hamlet of Bowldown.

== Geography ==
The parish covers about 1,571 acres (636 ha). The geology is mostly of the Jurassic and Cretaceous periods. It is on a high water table and the soil is composed of sand with a sub-soil of Oxford Clay. The village stands on a hill, rising to 100 metres (330 ft) towards its western end. It is an example of a 'squared' village with approaches from Chippenham, Swindon and Malmesbury. It has three greens; the largest is the Common, which is the focal point of the village.

The village is 1.5 miles (2.4 km) long and is separated from Kington St. Michael (to the west) by the A350 road which links Chippenham with the M4 motorway and Malmesbury.

== Governance ==
Kington Langley is a civil parish with an elected parish council. It is in the area of Wiltshire Council unitary authority, which performs most local government functions. The parish is part of Kington electoral division, which covers six rural parishes north of Chippenham, together with Chippenham Without to the west, and elects one member of Wiltshire Council.

== History ==
A brief history of Kington Langley is given in the relevant Wiltshire Community History page.

A settlement of 25 households at Langhelei was recorded in the Domesday Book of 1086, when the land was held by Glastonbury Abbey.

Kington Langley was part of the parish of Kington St. Michael until 1865. The Kington prefix serves to distinguish it from another nearby village, Langley Burrell. The hamlet was known as Langley Fitzurse in medieval times, although other spellings such as Langeleghe (11th century), "Langley Fearne" (c.1513), "Langley Fernhill" (1660) have been used.

=== Greathouse ===
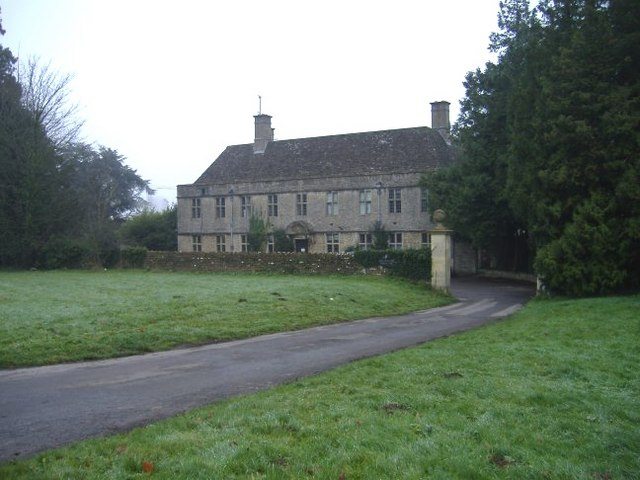
Great House, Kington Langley

The Greathouse, beside the B4069 road, was built in about 1690. In the 1699 marriage settlement of William Coleman and Elizabeth Hastings it is described as "All that capital messuage or tenement lately erected by William Coleman deceased (d. 1691) late Father of William Coleman". It is a country house of nine bays and two storeys. Between 1783 and 1832 Greathouse was leased to Isaac Salter and his son Simon Salter (1766–1832) and used as a clothing factory specialising in woollen goods. The third generation, Simon Uncles Salter and his brother Isaac, moved to old Burton Hill House, near Malmesbury, and continued the manufacture of woollen goods at a new site near the bridge.

Greathouse became a farmhouse, tenanted by Mr Anstey, and it was during this period (1875) that Kilvert visited, noting "the perishing remains of a fine old china cupboard with a shell porch corresponding to the shell porch of the house". It was restored and extended between 1907 and 1913 for Charles Garnett, a stockbroker from London, who had moved from Vasterne House, Wootton Bassett. The architect was Douglas Stewart of London, and the contractors were James Long & Son of Bradford-on-Avon. Greathouse Estate was sold in 1957 and in 1972 there was an auction of antique effects on behalf of Leonard Cheshire who used the premises until 2018. The house was designated as Grade II* listed in 1960.

=== The Manor ===
The Manor was formerly an Inn called The White Horse. It was converted to the Manor House by Walter Coleman (1778–1845) on his coming of age and inheritance of much of the land and cottages in the Tything of Kington Langley. The house was designated as Grade II listed in 1960.

=== Fitzurse manor and farm ===
This manor was on the north side of Parkers Lane and is described by Aubrey:- "In Langley is another little Mannour called Langley Fitzurse. The Hill that leades up to Langley from Kington, is to this day called Fitzurse-hill. The Estate is now Mr Bampfield Sidenham’s who bought it of the heirs of Ralph Hopton, 1st Baron Hopton. It is a very ancient-built howse with a great Hall, and moted about". There were vestiges of the moat remaining in the late 19th century, by which time the farm had been converted to Eli Holder's sawmills, on the Draycot Estate (until 1920). Most of the sawmills were demolished in the late 1930s and only the barn remained by the late 1950s.

There is no evidence that Reginald Fitzurse, one of the Knights who murdered Thomas Becket, was ever resident in Kington Langley. But Urso held land, from the Church, according to the Domesday Book. And Jordan Fitzurse was in dispute with Glastonbury Abbey in 1243.

=== School ===
A National School was built by John Darley & Sons of Chippenham in 1856/7 for 50-60 children and enlarged in 1886; after protracted negotiation and fundraising, by subscription, a school house was added in 1859–60. Land for both was donated by William Pole-Tylney-Long-Wellesley, 5th Earl of Mornington of Draycot House, Draycot Cerne. By 1919 there were around 90 pupils. Children of all ages attended until 1940 when those over 11 went to secondary schools in Chippenham.

== Churches ==
=== Parish church ===
Parishioners used to have to travel more than 1 mile (1.6 km) from Kington Langley to worship at Kington St. Michael. Until 1670, there was a chapel of ease at Kington Langley. In 1857 a church was completed and dedicated to St Peter. The building was designed by C.H. Gabriel and has lancet windows in an Early English Gothic style. In 1865 a district chapelry was created for the new church, with the same boundaries as Langley Fitzurse tithing, giving it the status of a parish church which could be used for baptisms, marriages and burials. St. Peter's is in the Diocese of Bristol.

From 1954 the vicar of Kington Langley also served the former parish of Draycot Cerne, which lost its church in 1994 when St James' was declared redundant. Today the parish is part of the Draycot benefice, which covers five neighbouring parishes.

=== Union Chapel ===
The earliest known record of Protestant Dissenters meeting for worship in Kington Langley is dated 1742. They met in private houses until 1834, when the house registered for their meetings was that of James Pinnegar, a builder. Pinnegar built Union Chapel on the Common, completing it in 1835. The name refers to its foundation as a union of Dissenters of the Baptist, Moravian and Independent traditions.

The chapel choir met in the middle of the nineteenth century at a chapel-goer's house on Sundays. The chapel also had a band that used instruments such as flutes and violas.

Union Chapel remains independent, and as of 2015 is active under the title of Union Chapel Christian Fellowship.

== Amenities ==
Kington Langley had two public houses: the Hit or Miss Inn (17th century) and the Plough Inn (17th and 18th). now both closed. The primary school continues as Langley Fitzurse CofE Primary School, with voluntary controlled status. There is a village hall, a playing field, a tennis court and a park.

== Notable people ==
- Francis Kilvert (1840–1879), diarist and grandson of Walter Coleman, Lord of the Manor.
- Harry Dolman (1897–1977), chairman and president of Bristol City F.C.
- Norris McWhirter (1925–2004), co-founder and editor of Guinness World Records
- Robin Tanner (1904–1988), artist
- Heather Tanner (1903–1993), writer and campaigner

Wiltshire Village, a 1939 book published by Collins with text by Heather Tanner and illustrations by her husband Robin, is a thinly disguised description of local village life.

== Sources ==
- Pevsner, Nikolaus; Cherry, Bridget (revision) (1975) [1963]. The Buildings of England: Wiltshire. Harmondsworth: Penguin Books. p. 281.
