= Calne railway station =

Rail station in England

Coordinates: 51.43530°N 2.00858°W

Calne
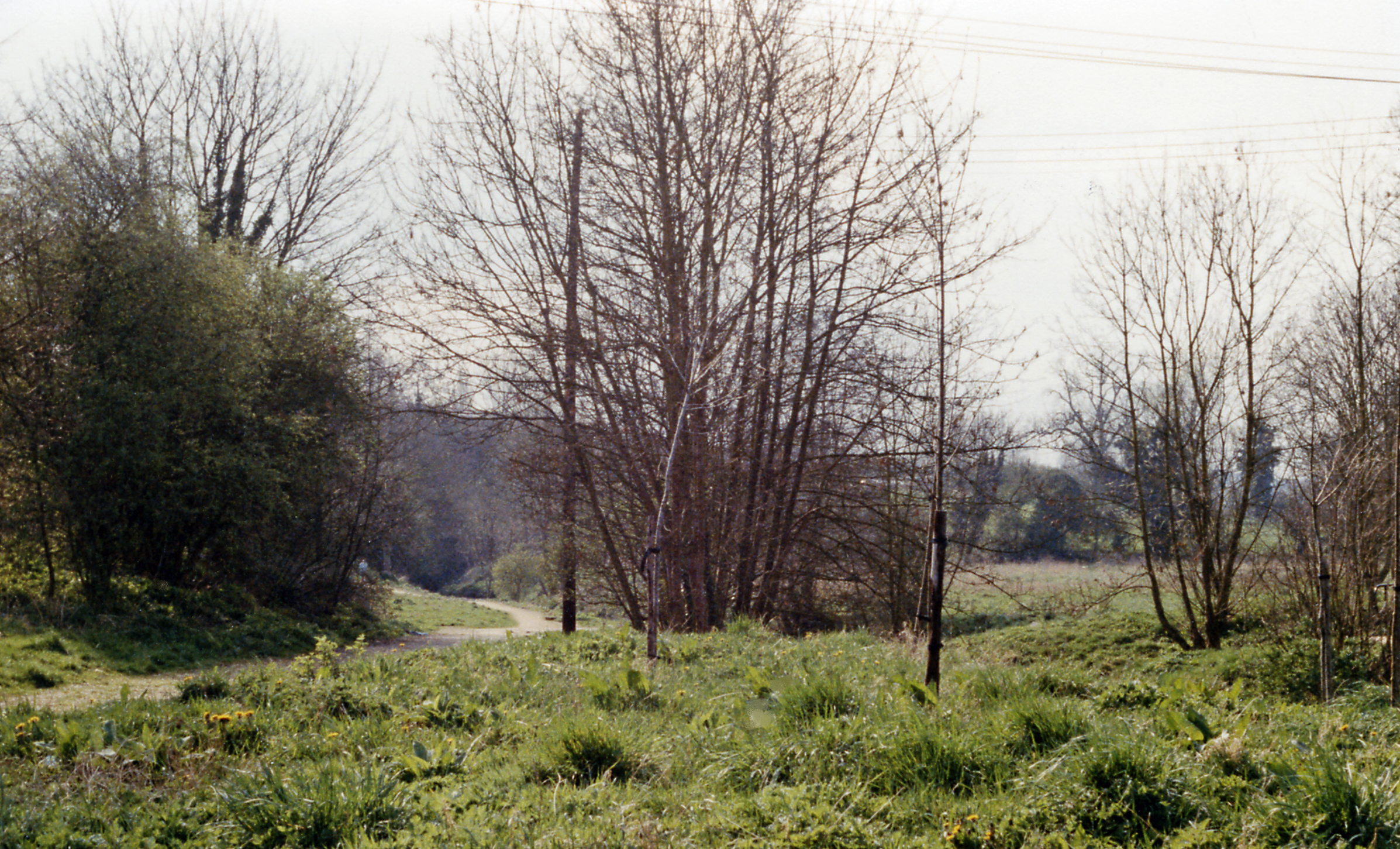
- Probable site of trackbed near Calne station, 1989

General information
- Location: Calne, Wiltshire; England
- Grid reference: ST995706
- Platforms: 1

Other information
- Status: Disused

History
- Original company: Calne Railway
- Pre-grouping: Great Western Railway
- Post-grouping: Great Western Railway

Key dates
- 3 November 1863: Opened
- 20 September 1965: Closed
Location

Calne railway station was opened on 3 November 1863 by the Great Western Railway as a terminus for their 5 miles (8.0 km) Chippenham and Calne branch line from the Great Western Main Line at Chippenham, England. It was a short distance from Calne town centre and had one platform.

The station, when first opened, had its own engine shed. In the early years, the seven sidings were usually full due to the amount of traffic arriving from the nearby Chippenham station.

Following closure in 1965 as part of the nationwide Beeching Axe, the buildings were left to be vandalised but were eventually taken down. A few years later the Station Road Industrial Estate was built on the site, which in turn was replaced by a housing development in 2014.

| Preceding station | Disused railways | Following station |
|---|---|---|
| Black Dog Halt | BR (Western Region); Chippenham and Calne Line | Terminus |
