= Heather Tanner =

British writer (1903–1993)

- Born: Heather Muriel Spackman; July 14, 1903; Corsham, Wiltshire, England
- Died: June 23, 1993 (aged 89); Kington St Michael, Wiltshire, England
- Education: Chippenham Grammar School; King's College London
- Occupations: Writer, teacher, activist
- Spouse: Robin Tanner (m. 1931)
- Writing career
- Genres: Nature writing, Topography, Commonplace book
- Subjects: Rural life, Botany, Quakerism, Social justice
- Notable works: Wiltshire Village (1939); Woodland Plants (1981)
- Movement: Arts and Crafts movement

Heather Tanner (14 July 1903 – 23 June 1993), née Heather Muriel Spackman, was an English writer and campaigner on issues relating to peace, the environment and social justice. She worked in close collaboration with her husband, Robin Tanner, at their home in Kington Langley, Wiltshire.

== Biography ==
Tanner was born as Heather Spackman at 'Rose Cottage', Priory Street, Corsham, Wiltshire on 14 July 1903. Her parents were Daisy Goold (1865–1945) and Herbert Spackman (1864–1949), who had three daughters: Sylvia, Heather and Faith (Olive). Herbert Spackman, an accomplished musician and photographer, ran a grocery and drapery store in Corsham High Street. Heather and her younger sister, Faith Sharp, edited an account of their father’s early life, A Corsham Boyhood: The Diary of Herbert Spackman 1877–1891.

Heather Tanner attended Chippenham Grammar School, where she met her future husband, the etcher and teacher Robin Tanner. In his autobiography, Double Harness, Robin recounts how, as school prefects he and Heather would smuggle secret messages to each other in the absentee registers for which they were responsible as their relationship blossomed in the early 1920s. Heather achieved a First Class degree at King's College London, which she left in 1929 to become an English teacher at The Duchess School for Girls, Alnwick Castle, Northumberland. After a brief geographical separation while Robin studied at Goldsmiths College, London, they married at Corsham Church on 4 April 1931.

Heather and Robin Tanner moved to Kington Langley, Wiltshire, after their wedding, the start of a lifelong creative collaboration and residence. In Double Harness, Robin Tanner writes that Heather’s uncle, the architect Vivian Goold, 'generously offered as a wedding gift to design a house for us and supervise its building if we could find a piece of land we liked'. The result was Old Chapel Field, completed in 1931. The house, which is still standing in the village, is a distinctive blend of arts and crafts and modernist styles. Inspired by C.F.A. Voysey, Goold came to regard the house as the finest that he had designed. Heather and Robin had great affection for the 'Voyseyish' Old Chapel Field, and lived out their lives. The Tanners were thrilled to discover that Francis Kilvert’s great-grandfather was buried in the graveyard of the Chapel from which their home took its name, and both Heather and Robin actively supported the Kilvert Society.

In the spring of 1939 the Tanners took in a young Jewish refugee from Germany called Dietrich Hanff (1920–1992). Shortly after the outbreak of the Second World War, Hanff was interned and held as an enemy alien at Bury, Lancashire. Heather campaigned against what she considered his unfair treatment in the press, and eventually she was allowed to visit him after his transfer to the Isle of Man. It was later learned that his parents and brother were deported from their native Stettin (then Germany) to Piaski, Poland and that the Germans murdered them there in gas chambers. After Hanff finally gained his freedom as the Tanners’ adopted son, 'Dieti' was to closely share their interests, to become a teacher and university lecturer and to live at Old Chapel Field for the rest of his life.

After the War, Heather worked as an examiner in English for the University of Cambridge and later at the University of London. Her moral and spiritual outlook as a Quaker was to deeply affect her outlook and support for a range of environmental and social causes. She was an active member of the Chippenham branch of the Campaign for Nuclear Disarmament (visiting the Greenham Common Women's Peace Camp and attending many Aldermaston Marches) and supporter of Friends of the Earth and Oxfam.

During the 1980s, BBC television producer Margaret Benton made a film called Look Stranger: A Vision of Wiltshire which was released in 1987. This documented and celebrated Heather, Robin and Dieti’s home life, creativity, beliefs and love of the Wiltshire countryside.

Outliving both her husband and Dietrich Hanff, Heather Tanner died at Kington St Michael on 23 June 1993.

== Works ==
The Tanners created four books, that Robin illustrated and for which Heather provided the text, collaborating so closely together that Robin wrote that 'they were essentially the production of two minds working in such close unison that it would be impossible to separate them.'

=== Wiltshire Village ===
Wiltshire Village, published in 1939, is a thinly disguised description of the village life and countryside surrounding the Tanners' home. The subject of the book, Kington Borel, takes its name from a compound of their own village, Kington Langley, and the neighbouring parish of Langley Burrell (named after the Borel family who held the estate and manor in Norman times). Heather 's text and Robin's etchings and pen drawings reflect the picturesque rural landscape of north-west Wiltshire. Featuring history, culture, crafts and wildlife, Wiltshire Village embraces much of the Tanners' aesthetic and ethical creed as the celebration of traditional rural crafts and community is underpinned by a rejection of militarism, blood sports and the conservative outlook of feudal England; a creed in keeping with that of their hero William Morris.

=== Woodland Plants ===
In many ways a companion volume for Wiltshire Village, the Tanners similarly started to collate the materials for Woodland Plants during the early years of the Second World War, although the completed project was not published until 1981. It has been suggested that the manuscript was lost under the Tanners' bed for 17 years. The Tanners were keen amateur botanists and counted their original copy of James Sowerby’s 37-volume English Botany (1790–1814) as one of their most treasured possessions. Woodland Plants is an account of local plants' uses, lore and presence in literature. Robin Tanner produced the detailed drawings from sketches made in situ, mostly within a few miles of their home, such as in the Weavern (Bybrook) valley and at Bird's Marsh and Thickwood. In an epilogue, Heather reflects upon the way that the forty-year gestation of the book enabled them to observe and reflect upon the environmental damage that took place during the intervening period, but also, more positively, the emergence of ecological awareness.

=== A Country Alphabet ===
The preface to A Country Alphabet indicates that this work was a collaborative project between Heather who wrote the text and Robin who designed the letters. 'As a drawing was finished Heather would contemplate it as she went about the daily chores, now and then scribbling an idea on the nearest piece of paper.' Their friends the publishers Frances and Nicolas MacDowall at Old Stile Press contributed creatively towards the feel of the book through their experimentation and selection of typefaces, paper and pagination when it was first published as a limited hand-printed edition in 1984. This resulted in a tactile volume both in its content with its sensory celebration of physical things and in A Country Alphabet's feel and physical appearance as an artefact in its own right.

=== A Country Book of Days ===
In the pre-Victorian genre of the "book of days", this work is a celebration of rural life and rites through the cycle of the year. Heather's twenty-five entries, set out as a commonplace book, are accompanied by Robin's woodcuts. Like A Country Alphabet, to which it is in some ways a companion volume, A Country Books of Days was originally published as a hand-printed limited edition in 1986, thus owing much not only to the style of William Morris but also to the early craft of book production exemplified by William Blake.

Two further books were published posthumously.

=== Out of Nazi Germany: An Account of the Life of Dietrich Hanff ===
Hanff's 1944 account of his escape from Nazi Germany, together with an essay by Heather Tanner based on papers that she was working on at the end of her life in 1993. Published by Impact, 1995.

=== An Exceptional Woman: The Writings of Heather Tanner ===
An Exceptional Woman: The Writings of Heather Tanner was edited by her friend Rosemary Devonald and published by Hobnob Press in 2006. It includes memories of Heather’s early life in Corsham, a fine essay on the Wiltshire countryside, and "What I Believe", outlining her Quaker philosophy.

== Bibliography ==
- Tanner, Heather. Exercises in Punctuation (London: Macmillan & Co., 1936).
- Tanner, Heather and Robin Tanner. Wiltshire Village ([s.l.]: Collins, 1939).
- Tanner, Heather and Robin Tanner. Woodland Plants (London: Robin Garton, 1981).
- Tanner, Heather and Robin Tanner. A Country Alphabet (London: Old Stile Press, 1984).
- Tanner, Heather and Robin Tanner. A Country Book of Days (London: Old Stile Press, 1986).
- Tanner, Heather and Dietrich Hanff. Out of Nazi Germany: An Account of the Life of Dietrich Hanff (London: Impact, 1995).
- Tanner, Heather. An Exceptional Woman: The Writings of Heather Tanner, ed. Rosemary Devonald (Salisbury: Hobnob Press, 2006).
