= Maud Heath's Causeway =

Pathway in Wiltshire, England

Coordinates: 51.4810°N 2.0782°W

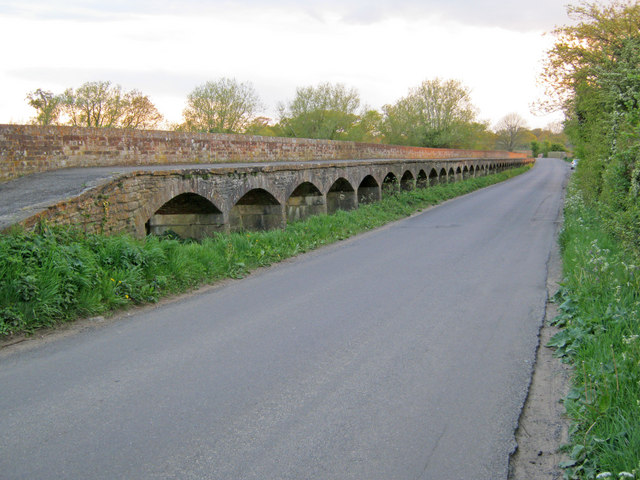
Maud Heath's Causeway at Langley Burrell Without in the River Avon flood plain

Maud Heath's Causeway is a pavement dating from the 15th century, near Chippenham in Wiltshire, England. Its route includes a 19th-century brick structure which is Grade II* listed.

The causeway is the gift of Matilda Heath or Hethe, a local property owner and philanthropist who was connected with wealthy Bristol shipping merchants. She gifted properties and land in Chippenham into a trust so that the income could be used to maintain the causeway, which was part of an alternative route east from Chippenham; travellers would have climbed up to Bremhill and joined the London road near Calne. Among them would have been John Bagot, MP for Bristol in 1467 and 1472. He inherited the manor house at Kellaways, in which Matilda lived; it is thought that she was his elderly aunt.

Research published in 2024 disproved a widely known theory that Maud was a widow who made her living carrying eggs to market at Chippenham.

On both sides of its crossing of the River Avon, just west of Kellaways, the path rises above the floodplain on sixty-four brick arches (built 1812, largely reconstructed in the 20th century) alongside an undistinguished country road between Bremhill and Langley Burrell. Since 1960, the raised section has been listed Grade II* on the National Heritage List for England.

Over five hundred years later, a charity – Maud Heath's Trust – still maintains the path out of her bequest.

A brief guide to the causeway was written by K.R. Clew in 1982.

== Monuments ==
Near the east bank of the Avon at grid reference ST 9469 7580, a three-metre high carved stone pillar with sundials, dated 1698, is inscribed "To the memory of the worthy Maud Heath of Langly Burrell Widow who in the year of Grace 1474 for the good of travellers did in Charity bestow in Lands and houses about Eight pounds a year for ever to be laid out on the Highways and Causey leading from Wick Hill to Chippenham Clift".

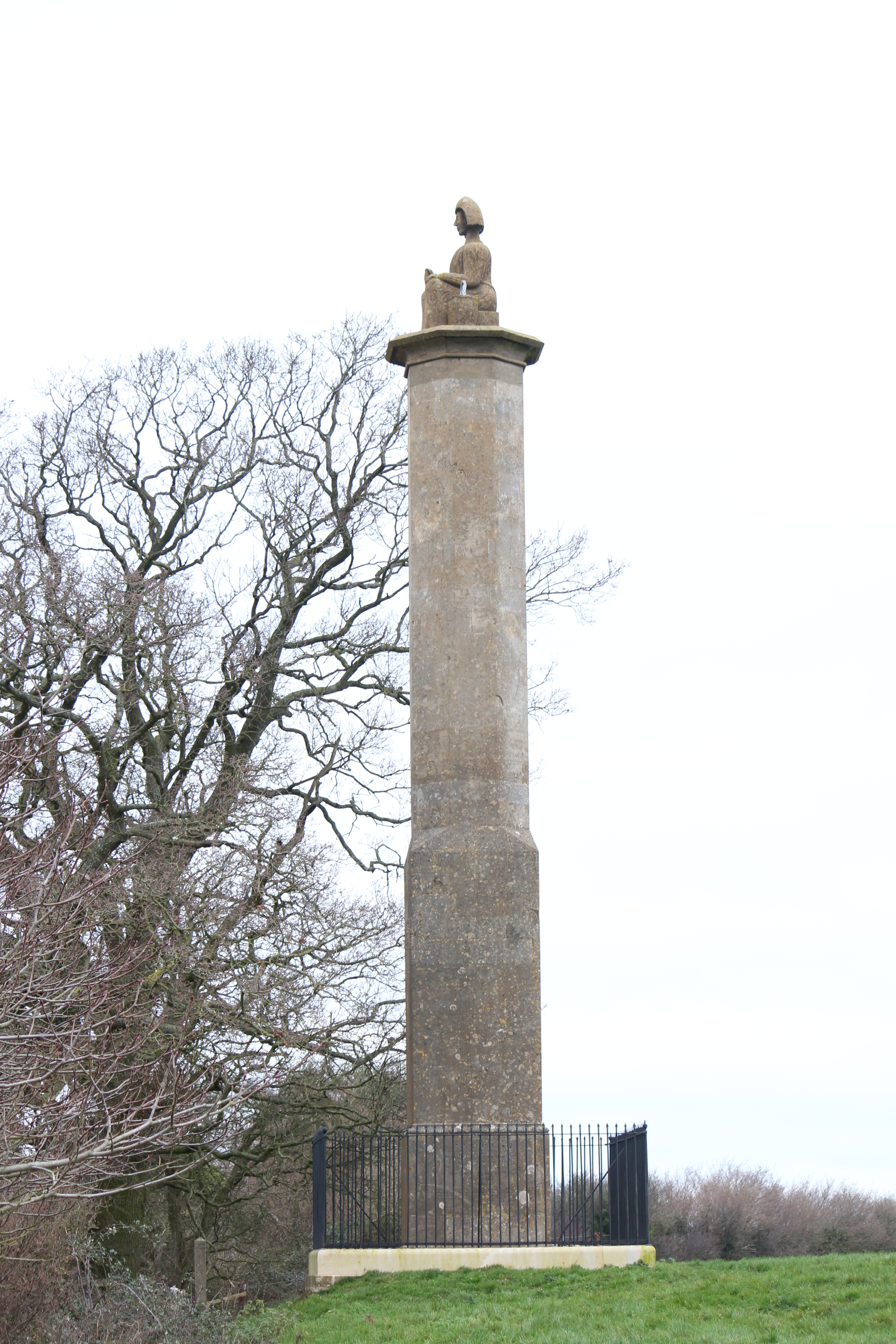
Monument to Maud Heath overlooking the Bremhill end of the causeway

A roadside marker stone near the eastern terminus at Wick Hill near Bremhill, at ST 9730 7386 about 2.1 miles (3.4 km) southeast of the Avon crossing, carries an iron plate inscribed "From this Wick-Hill/begins the praise/Of Maud Heath's gift/To these highways". Further up the hill stands Maud Heath's Monument, a statue of the eponymous lady, erected on a high column in 1838 and looking out over the river and its floodplain. The statue, in a bonnet and authentic plebeian clothes from the reign of Edward IV, was erected by Lord Lansdowne and features a poem by the critic William Lisle Bowles, who was vicar of Bremhill at the time, which reads:

'Thou who dost pause on this aerial height/ Where Maud Heath's Pathway winds in shade and light/ Christian wayfarer in a world of strife/ Be still and consider the Path of Life.'
