= Black Dog Halt railway station =

Disused railway station in Calne, Wiltshire

Coordinates: 51.4359°N 2.0275°W

Black Dog Halt
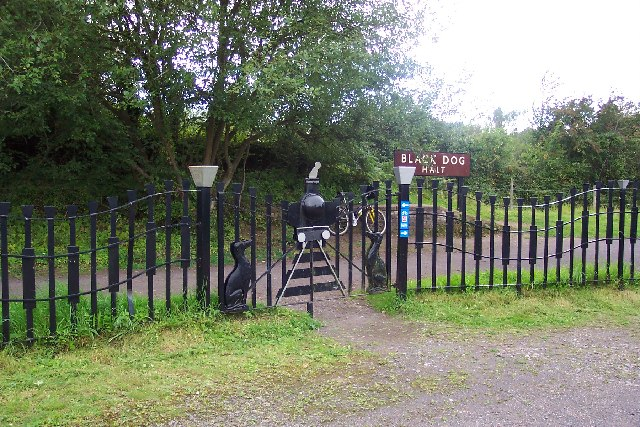
- Black Dog Halt in 2004

General information
- Location: Calne, Wiltshire; England
- Grid reference: ST981707
- Platforms: 1

Other information
- Status: Disused

History
- Original company: Calne Railway
- Pre-grouping: Great Western Railway
- Post-grouping: Great Western Railway

Key dates
- 3 November 1863: Opened as Black Dog Siding
- 8 June 1953: Renamed; Black Dog Halt
- 20 September 1965: Closed
Location

Black Dog Halt is a former railway station on the Chippenham and Calne line in Wiltshire, England. Originally created in 1863 as a private stop for Lord Lansdowne of Bowood House, it became a public request stop after the formation of British Rail. The halt was closed and demolished in 1965, and today it is part of National Cycle Route 403.

== History ==
Black Dog Halt was opened on 3 November 1863 by the Calne Railway company. Lord Lansdowne of Bowood House used the halt as a private station; use by the public was allowed, though it was not common knowledge. Lord Lansdowne had a special compartment in one of the Calne line's autocoaches. Later he was persuaded to allow the halt to be named on the timetable.

The Calne Railway company was sold to the Great Western Railway in 1892. After the formation of British Rail the halt was turned into a request stop.

In 1965 the halt was closed and soon the buildings were demolished; however, the platform remains intact. The tracks were lifted in 1967.

Today the site of the halt is being used as part of National Cycle Route 403 which runs from Chippenham to Calne. The former route of the track is also a popular route for walkers. It is possible to walk to both Calne and Bowood House from here.

Preceding station	Disused railways	Following station
Stanley Bridge Halt	BR (Western Region); Chippenham and Calne Line	Calne
