= Edward Eddrup =

Canon Edward Paroissien Eddrup (1823 – 13 November 1905) was a Church of England clergyman who spent most of his career in Wiltshire, England.

The eldest son of Edward Charles Eddrupp, Esq., of St Catherine Cree, in the City of London, he was born in Leadenhall Street. On 27 January 1841, at the age of seventeen, he matriculated at Wadham College, Oxford, and went on to graduate B.A. in 1845, and M.A. in 1847. While at the university he was a member of the Oxford Society for Promoting the Study of Gothic Architecture.

Eddrup was successively chancellor of Salisbury Cathedral, principal of the Theological College, Salisbury (from 1861), and select preacher at Oxford (1871 to 1873). By 1861 he was the prebendary of the cathedral for Durnford. According to a newspaper account, on 3 April 1868 the Bishop of Salisbury, Dr Walter Kerr Hamilton, collated Eddrup "to the Briant and Emanuel Parsons", and he was Vicar of Bremhill from 1868 until his death.

On 12 August 1856, at St George's, Hanover Square, Eddrup married Helen Annette Campbell, the only daughter of Sir John Nicholl Robert Campbell, 2nd Baronet, and they went on to have six sons and three daughters: Edward Charles Paroissien, 1857, Helen Catherine Beatrix, 1858, Lucy Maud, 1860, Herbert Osmond Hamilton, 1862, Robert Arthur Campbell, 1863, Hermann Francis, 1865, Theodore Basil, 1868, Ella Grace Elizabeth, 1871, and Ernest Clement, 1873. Lucy Maud married Edward Stroud at Newton Abbott in 1884.

Eddrup's mother, Elizabeth Eddrup (1798–1874), and his wife Helen Annette Eddrup (1833–1887), are both buried in the churchyard at Bremhill and were joined there by Eddrup himself when he died in 1905.

== Publications ==
- E. P. Eddrup, Papal Aggression: The True Light in Which to Regard and the Right Spirit in Which to Oppose It, a Sermon (printed 1851)
- Edward Paroissien Eddrup, Scripture and Science: a sermon preached in Salisbury Cathedral on Septuagesima Sunday, 1865 (Rivingtons, Oxford and Cambridge, 1865)
- A Dictionary of the Bible: its Antiquities, Biography, Geography, and Natural History, by Various Writers, ed. Dr William Smith (John Murray, 1872) — contributor
- Canon E. P. Eddrup, 'Notes on some Wiltshire Superstitions', in Wiltshire Archaeological and Natural History Magazine, vol. 22 (1885), pp. 330–334
