= Stanley Abbey =

Monastery in Wiltshire, England

- Interactive map of Stanley Abbey

Monastery information
- Other name: St. Mary of Downfront
- Order: Cistercian
- Established: 1151
- Disestablished: 1536

People
- Founder: Empress Maud

Site
- Location: Bremhill, Wiltshire, England
- Coordinates: 51°27′17″N 2°05′50″W
- Visible remains: None
- Public access: No

Stanley Abbey was a medieval abbey near Chippenham, Wiltshire, England, which flourished between 1151 and 1536.

== Foundation ==
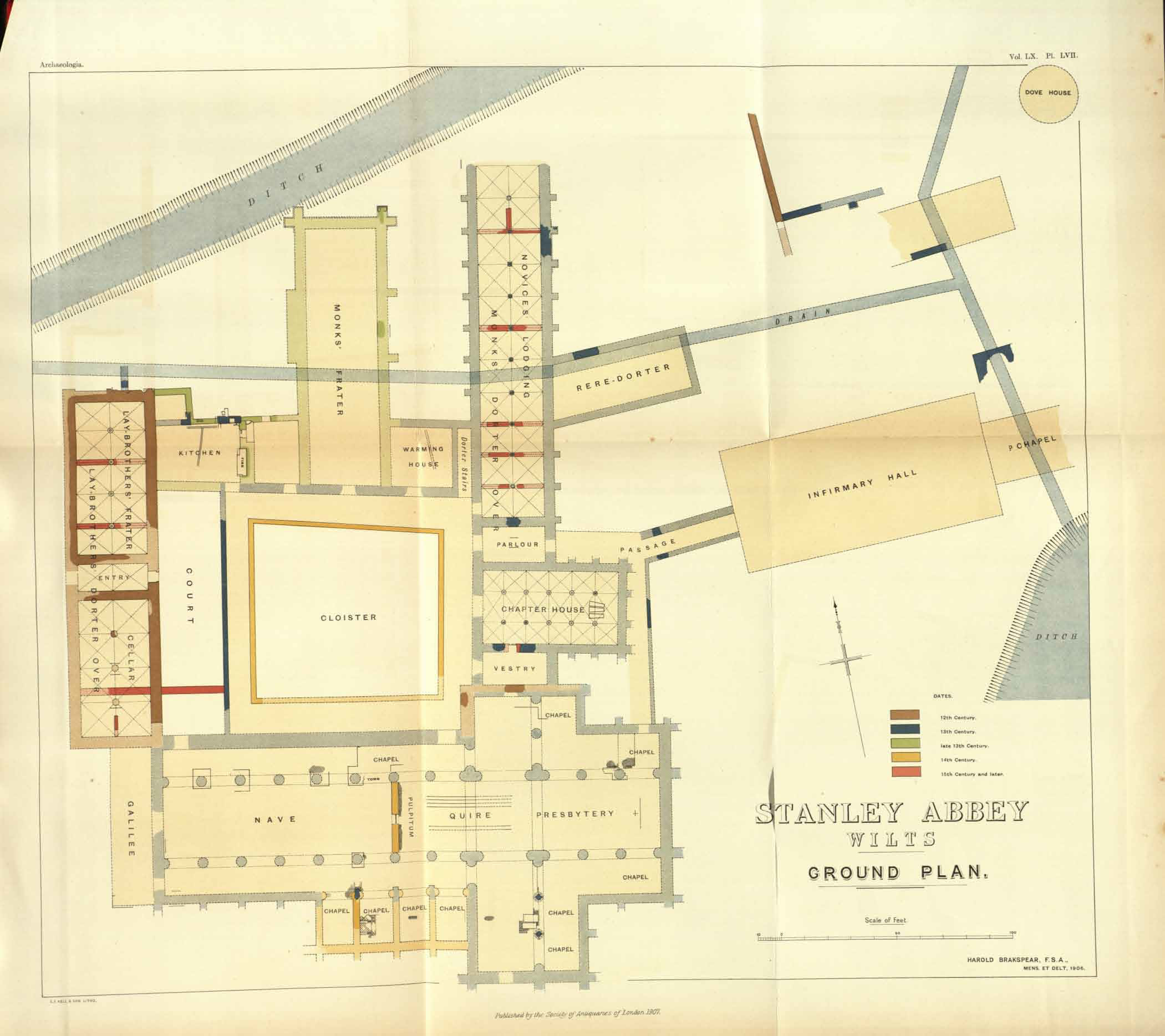
Ground plan of the abbey, from the description by Brakspear (1907)

The abbey was given by Empress Matilda in 1151 to monks from Quarr Abbey on the Isle of Wight. Originally at Loxwell, to the east of Chippenham, it moved to nearby Stanley in 1154. The abbey grew in size in the twelfth and thirteenth centuries, reaching a size of 450 acres (1.8 km^{2}) at its largest. Its influence also grew, Abbot Nicholas entertaining King John in October 1200 and in 1210 Abbot Thomas of Calstone attending the meeting of King John and the Cistercian abbots at York. In 1280 King Edward I gave stone to the abbey for a chamber to be built for his own use, and according to the abbey chronicle he made use of it in the spring of 1282. Princess Mary, the bishop of Salisbury and Edward II were all reported to have stayed at the abbey during the first years of the fourteenth century.

Its operation finally ceased as a result of the dissolution of the monasteries. The last abbot was Thomas Calne (also called Morley), and the abbey was dissolved in February 1536. Nothing now remains in situ except a green site on private property, but access may be obtained to visit it from Old Abbey Farm.

== Subsequent history ==
At the dissolution the land passed into the possession of Sir Edward Baynton, who plundered the materials to build his manor house at Bromham. In 1864 the land was sold by John Bayntun Starky to Gabriel Goldney of Chippenham.

At various times since, remains such as burial places and a blacksmith's forge, as well as coins and tiles, have been found. Harold Brakspear's 1905 excavation discovered the layout of the monastery, including the church, infirmary and a dovecote.

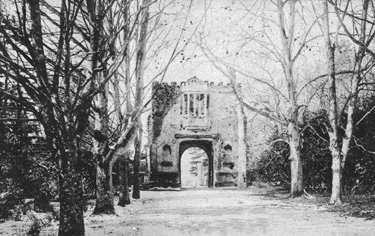
Spye Arch in the 19th century

Its original entrance now forms the gateway to Spye Park and is known locally as Spye Arch.
