= Stanley Bridge Halt railway station =

Former railway station in England

Coordinates: 51.4532°N 2.0677°W

Stanley Bridge Halt

General information
- Location: Chippenham, Wiltshire; England
- Grid reference: ST953726
- Platforms: 1

Other information
- Status: Disused

History
- Original company: Great Western Railway
- Pre-grouping: Great Western Railway
- Post-grouping: Great Western Railway

Key dates
- 3 Apr 1905: Opened
- 20 Sep 1965: Closed
Location

Stanley Bridge Halt was a railway station on the Great Western Railway's branch line from Chippenham to Calne. Facilities were a wooden platform with a GWR pagoda shelter.

The halt closed in 1965.

| Preceding station | Disused railways | Following station |
|---|---|---|
| Chippenham | BR (Western Region); Chippenham and Calne Line | Black Dog Halt |
