= St Andrew's Church, Chippenham =

St Andrew's Parish Church, Chippenham
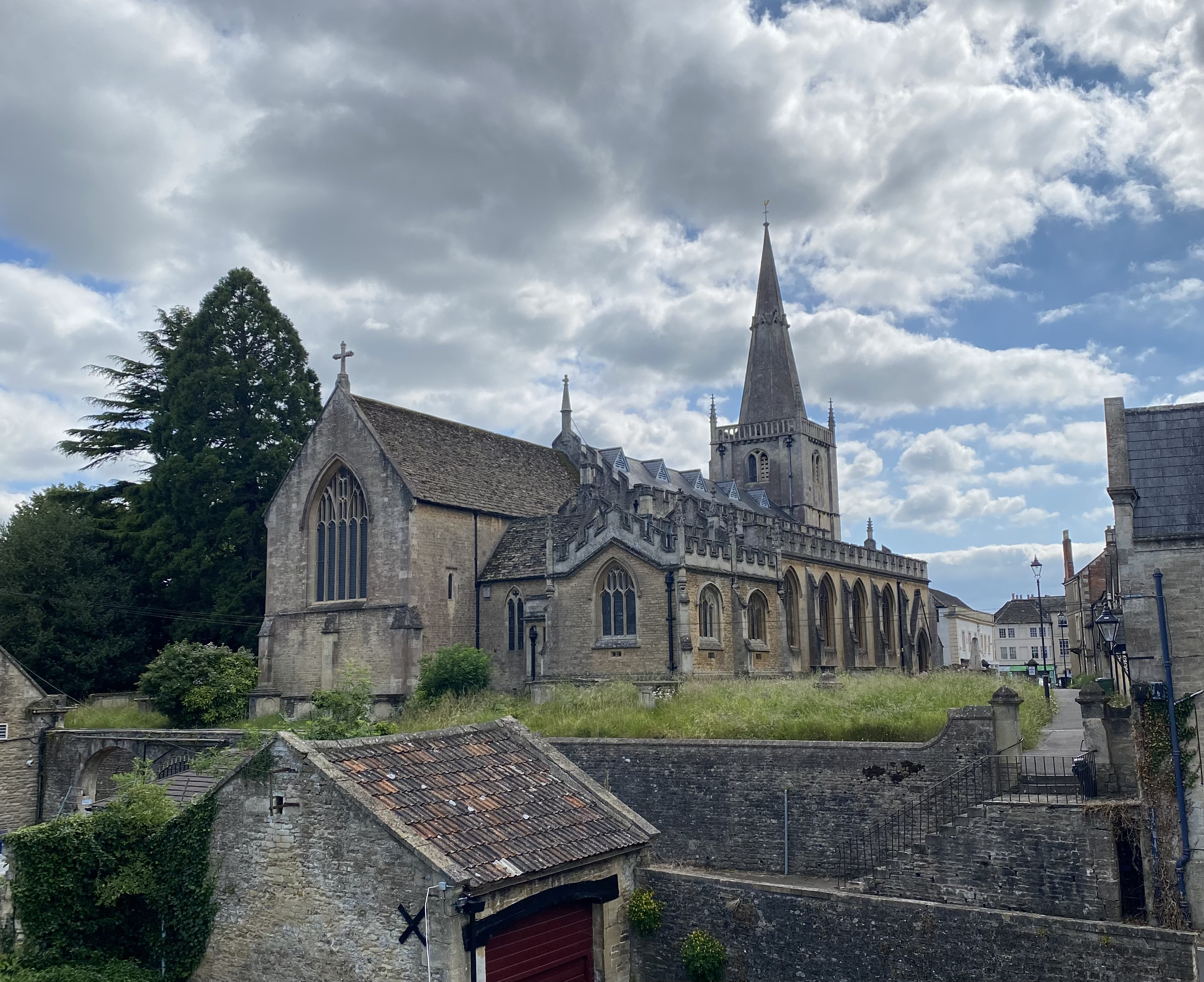
- St Andrew's Church, Chippenham

- Location within Wiltshire
- 51°27′28.4″N 2°6′45.4″W
- OS grid reference: ST 92281 73214
- Country: England
- Denomination: Church of England
- Churchmanship: Liberal Anglo-Catholic
- Website: www.standrewschippenham.org.uk

History
- Dedication: Saint Andrew

Administration
- Province: Canterbury
- Diocese: Bristol
- Parish: St Andrew, Chippenham

Clergy
- Vicar: Fr Benji Tyler

St Andrew's Church of England parish church in Chippenham, Wiltshire, England, is an Inclusive, Fairtrade and Eco Church, committed to showing God's love through welcome, service and inclusivity. It is one of four Anglican parish churches in the town, and serves the south and east of Chippenham. The church is situated next to the Market Place within the historic town centre, and is Grade II* listed.

St Andrew's is a large church, with a wide nave, separated from a long chancel by an early 20th century screen. There is a Lady Chapel to the south-east of the chancel which is the oldest part of the church. The north and south aisles are both of substantial width. St Katherine's chapel is a former Guild Chapel and is now used as a baptistry. There is a notable monument near the west end of the south aisle, to the Prynne family.

== History ==
The present church has 12th-century origins though it was built on the site of an Anglo-Saxon church and then largely rebuilt in the 15th century, including the addition of the ornate south chapel of 1442 for Walter, Lord Hungerford. The tower has a base from the 14th century but the rest was rebuilt in 1633. The church was restored in 1875–78, when the roof was raised, the chancel extended and the interior rearranged. A vestry was added in 1907.

The tower's eight bells were cast in 1734.

Traces remain of a west gallery, which, prior to the reordering in the 1870s, contained the Seede organ. The gallery was taken down when the organ was enlarged and moved to the east end of the north aisle. There was also a gallery in St Katherine's Chapel, also no longer in existence, though supporting stones for it can still be seen in the interior walls.

== Services ==
St Andrew's has a variety of services and worship styles, mostly centred on the Eucharist. At 9am on Sundays the Eucharist is offered in traditional language and at 10.30am the Eucharist is celebrated with choir, music group, worship singers and organ. Sung Evensong is offered once a month on the first Sunday, led by the choir.

The church of St Nicholas in the hamlet of Tytherton Lucas, about 1.7 miles (2.7 km) to the north-east, is a chapel of ease of St Andrew's and enjoys worship twice a month in the afternoon or evening, usually according to the Book of Common Prayer.

== Choirs ==
There are two singing groups involved in church services, the Robed Choir and the St Andrew's Singers. The former sings at the main morning service on the 1st, 3rd, and 5th Sundays. Choral services have been maintained at this church for many years. The singing group, less formally constituted, provides the music for the All Age services on the 2nd and 4th Sundays of the month.

The church is affiliated to the Royal School of Church Music, and training in the robed choir follows the RSCM's Voice for Life programme.

== Organ ==
The organ is a large three-manual and pedal instrument with 46 speaking stops. It retains much pipework from the organ by Brice Seede of 1752, together with the fine case façade. Pedal pipes and mechanical stop-changing facilities were added by Holdich in 1852. In 1879 the instrument was rebuilt by Gray and Davison when it was moved from its original west gallery location to a north aisle organ chamber. Further additions were made in the 20th century: the organ was converted to pneumatic action by Adkins in 1931, a detached console with electro-pneumatic controls was installed in a further rebuild by Percy Daniel & Co. in 1965, and further alterations were made by Coulson in 1986.

== Cultural and other events ==
The church is also a focus for many civic events and is used by a number of local groups (orchestras and choirs) as a performance venue. Local schools (primary and secondary) use the church for their Christmas events.

== Sources ==
- Pevsner, Nikolaus; Cherry, Bridget (revision) (1975) [1963]. Wiltshire. The Buildings of England (2nd ed.). Harmondsworth: Penguin Books. pp. 167–168. ISBN 0-14-0710-26-4.
