= Robin Tanner (artist) =

British artist (1904–1988)

- Born: 1904; Bristol
- Died: 1988; Wiltshire
- Education: Goldsmiths College
- Known for: etcher and illustrator
- Movement: neo-romanticism

Robin Tanner (1904–1988) was an English artist, etcher, teacher, and printmaker. He followed in the visionary tradition of Samuel Palmer and English neo-romanticism. He lived in London, at Kington Langley in Wiltshire, and at Bath.

== Biography ==
His etchings began following night-school classes at Goldsmiths College, London. He had been inspired by the major Samuel Palmer retrospective exhibition organised by Martin Hardie in London in 1926, and his first etching was made in that year. He was particularly moved by Palmer's early Shoreham works which had been so influential on fellow students such as Paul Drury, William Larkins and Graham Sutherland. He also acknowledged his admiration for the technical craftsmanship of the older etcher, F.L. Griggs.

Tanner was thus part of the etching revival in England, but the market for etchings collapsed following the economic depression of 1929, and the growing use of photography for illustration.

Tanner turned to teaching to earn his livelihood. His passion for teaching fine art to young children was infused into many English counties through his role as H.M. Inspector of Schools in primary schools from 1935 to 1964. Tanner believed that the study of natural things and the exploration of arts and crafts, music and poetry were essential for the development of teachers and children. At the Ministry of Education, he ran courses for primary teachers, often with Christian Schiller.

Following his retirement in 1964, Tanner took up printmaking again with dedication. He also had a sideline in topographical graphic book illustration, collaborating with his wife, Heather Spackman, whom he had married in 1931, and he published a number of books on printmaking aimed at children. Wiltshire Village was reprinted as late as 1978, and became a best seller. In 1932 they had moved into the house they built at Kington Langley outside Chippenham, Old Chapel Field, where the diarist Francis Kilvert's ancestors lie buried. They lived there for the rest of their lives. He was a founder and benefactor of the Crafts Study Centre, now at Farnham, Surrey. He was awarded an Honorary Degree (MA) by the University of Bath in 1977.

His later work, such as Woodland Plants, shows the influence of William Morris.

== Collections ==
Tanner's etching plates are held at the Ashmolean Museum, Oxford.

His personal papers regarding his educational work are held in the Archives of the Institute of Education, University College London (Ref: BTA). The Institute of Education Archives also hold material relating to Tanner in the papers of George and Judith Baines (REF:BA).

The University of Bristol Special Collections holds letters written by Tanner, along with some sketches, collected verses, and draft and final versions of his autobiography and volume of collected letters (Ref: DM 1450).

Wiltshire Museum, Devizes holds many etchings and published works.

The Crafts Study Centre, Farnham holds the Robin and Heather Spackman collection which includes personal documents; correspondence; sketches, drawings, prints and etchings by Robin and Heather; notebooks and commonplace books kept by Heather; travel journals; and written work by Heather.

The Young Gallery, Salisbury, holds a collection of Tanner's botanical drawings, students' artwork and typographical work.

== Retrospectives ==
- Ashmolean Museum of Art, Oxford, 1981. "Robin Tanner".
- The Fine Art Society, London, 2004. "Visions of Landscape: Samuel Palmer & Robin Tanner".
