= Bencroft Hill Meadows =

Biological Site of Special Scientific Interest in Wiltshire, England

Coordinates: 51.4578°N 2.0561°W

Bencroft Hill Meadows (grid reference ST962732) is a 5.1 hectare biological Site of Special Scientific Interest some 3 miles (5 km) to the east of the town of Chippenham in Wiltshire, England, notified in 1988. The site is a flora-rich example of unimproved pasture on the Oxford Clay Vale of North Wiltshire which attracts butterflies such as the small copper, small heath and common blue.

== Sources ==
- Natural England citation sheet for the site (accessed 22 March 2022)
