= Chippenham and Calne line =

Rail line in England

The Chippenham and Calne line was a five mile long single-track branch railway line that ran along the valley of the River Marden in Wiltshire, England, from Chippenham on the Great Western Main Line to Calne, via two intermediate halts. Built by the Calne Railway Company and opened in 1863, the line was sold in 1892 to the Great Western Railway company.

== History ==
=== Origins ===
The Great Western Railway (GWR) opened its main line from London to Bristol in 1841, with a station at Chippenham. Calne was an important market and industrial town not far away, and at the time it had 16 mills within three miles, and moreover housed the largest bacon factory in England.

Seeing themselves at a disadvantage by not being on the railway, a meeting of interested parties was held on 3 November 1859, and this led to a public meeting on 8 November 1859, proposing a railway connecting the town with Chippenham and the main line. This was supported with great enthusiasm; only James C. Hale, proprietor of the Calne branch of the Wilts & Berks Canal, was not happy. £15,000 of share subscriptions were promised before the meeting closed. James Baird Burke was to be the engineer, and his estimate of the construction cost was £26,663.

The formal subscription proceeded and four members of the Harris family—proprietors of the bacon factory—subscribed over 50% of the capital. All seemed to be going well but a disturbing letter was soon received: (Note: The letter was dated 2 November 1859, but presumably did not arrive until after the public meeting.) it had been understood that the GWR would be supportive, but the letter warned that income on the line might not cover the operating costs of the line for several years, and that any profits would fail to contribute to repaying the capital cost.

James Burke's authority as the company's engineer seems to have been in question, for on 19 November 1859 a "joint engineer" was appointed: James Samuel, formerly resident engineer for the Eastern Counties Railway was given the job. It is likely that he had been given a particular task, for on 14 December 1859 he reported that he estimated the construction cost of the line to be £32,000; on presenting this information he withdrew from involvement with the scheme.

=== Difficulties making a start ===
The directors now had a serious problem in maintaining momentum; they wrote to Burke offering £1,950 as his fee if he could bring about construction of the line for £27,000, but only £1,000 if the sum was overrun. He accepted this arrangement, and it was apparently modified by negotiation later to £1,650 if he was successful, and £1,000 if not.

Burke found a contractor, Richard Hattersley, who undertook to complete the construction of the line for £27,000, and he would accept £5,000 of the payment in shares in the company. However he then discovered that he would be expected to construct the stations within the sum, and he withdrew. He was persuaded to undertake the construction for the reduced sum of £26,000 without stations: a local builder would construct the Calne station.

Calne Railway Act 1860
- Act of Parliament
- Parliament of the United Kingdom
- Long title: An Act to authorize the Construction of a Railway from the Great Western Railway at Chippenham to Calne in Wilts.
- Citation: 23 & 24 Vict. c. xi

Dates
- Royal assent: 15 May 1860

Text of statute as originally enacted

On 15 May 1860 the company obtained its authorising act of Parliament, the Calne Railway Act 1860 (23 & 24 Vict. c. xi); the capital was to be £35,000. Having got the act, the directors resolved not to start actual construction until all the shares had been taken up. This dismayed Hattersley, who had been led to believe by Burke that work was to start immediately. The impasse remained until October when, on the 10th, Hattersley agreed to take £10,000 in shares himself if the contract price were restored to £27,000.

=== Construction starts ===
This was agreed, and work could actually start at last.

At this period a working arrangement with the GWR was finalised, on 29 May, for a cash sum based on operation by a single locomotive, for two years; after that time the charge would be for a rising percentage of receipts.

On 6 June 1861 the directors discovered that an additional £10,000 was required to complete the line. A number of extra items had been required, not allowed for in Burke's original contract arrangements; this included bridge works, an engine house and goods accommodation etc. at Calne, and these alone amounted to £5,250. This shortfall at the margin dragged on and Hattersley's solicitor wrote to the company on 6 June 1863 demanding payment of moneys due to him.

On 17 June the chief engineer of the GWR, Michael Lane, inspected the works and found that many aspects were unsatisfactory; Burke had given assurances that certain matters would be put in hand and in many cases this seems not have been done.

Nonetheless, Captain Tyler of the Board of Trade was brought to the line to inspect it formally for passenger opening; he criticised the arrangements at Chippenham station, where branch trains would have to use the main line platform, and where there was inadequate telegraph communication between the junction signalman and the station signalman. He also was dissatisfied with the condition of the bridges, and he refused sanction for opening.

A second inspection by Tyler on 7 October 1863 ended with the same result. Finally on 27 October 1863 his inspection was successful: the line could open to passengers at last.

=== Opening ===
The immediate result was an opening to a goods train on 29 October 1863; live pigs for Harris's factory were a major part of the load. Opening to passengers took place on 3 November 1863.

=== Finances ===
Calne Railway Act 1864
- Act of Parliament
- Parliament of the United Kingdom
- Long title: An Act for granting further Powers to "The Calne Railway Company."
- Citation: 27 & 28 Vict. c. xvi

Dates
- Royal assent: 28 April 1864

The company obtained an act of Parliament, the Calne Railway Act 1864 (27 & 28 Vict. c. xvi), increasing authorised capital by £14,000. Records of the purpose seem not to have survived, but it is likely that it was to pay off bank loans taken out to pay for the cost overrun at construction.

Profits for the half year to the end of 1864 were £53 11s 1d, with receipts from passengers and goods about equal. It was obvious that the warning by the GWR in 1859 that income would barely cover costs, was true.

At a directors' meeting on 21 December 1869 it was stated that all the debenture bank loans were overdue and that there were no resources to respond to the demands. It appears that the creditors realised that the company was unable to repay, and had few assets to seize in payment, and the impecunious company struggled on.

=== Sale to the Great Western Railway ===
On 2 June 1874 the Great Western Railway (GWR) warned the company that conversion of the track to standard gauge was soon required; the GWR undertook to carry out this work at cost, and this was agreed to. It was carried out on 15 and 16 August 1874, and opened on standard gauge on 17 August 1874; the cost had been £500.

As debts continued to mount, the directors negotiated with the Great Western Railway (GWR) to sell the line to them. Terms were agreed on 29 December 1877; naturally the GWR did not offer much to buy a railway that was losing money; the shareholders refused to ratify the provisional sale agreement. Finally terms were agreed and the transfer was authorised by the Great Western Railway Act 1892 (55 & 56 Vict. c. ccxxxiii) on 28 June 1892; the sale took effect on 1 July 1892, and shareholders received their original outlay on the shares when first issued.

== Description of the line ==
At the time of construction of the line, Chippenham station had two platforms and an over-all roof. The line was 5 miles 25 chains (8.5 km) in length. The gradient fell at 1 in 60 for some distance, then rising at a ruling gradient of 1 in 86 to Calne.

Originally the line was operated under "one engine in steam" arrangements, but in the 20th century the electric train token system was used, with a signal box at Calne; this closed on 2 November 1964 when freight working was discontinued, and the working arrangement reverted to one engine in steam.

There were two intermediate stations:

- Stanley Bridge Halt: opened 3 April 1905.
- Black Dog Halt: opened early on as a private station for the Bowood Estate of the Marquess of Lansdowne; a temporary platform there had been opened for a fete in 1870 and the station itself seemed to follow soon after; in April 1898 the GWR asked to erect a sign marked Black Dog Station, but this was refused; it was finally made a public station on 15 September 1952.

== Heyday ==
From 1900 to the 1930s the line handled much passenger and freight traffic, making Calne one of the busiest stations in Wiltshire. During the Second World War there was heavy passenger traffic for the RAF establishments at Lyneham, Compton Bassett and Yatesbury, which continued into the early 1950s.

== Closure ==
With the increase in road vehicle usage throughout the 20th century, use of the line by passengers and for freight purposes declined steadily, and in the 1960s it was clear that the future of the line was doubtful. Freight traffic had disappeared by the time the last passenger train ran on 18 September 1965. The track was lifted in 1967.

== The route today ==
Much of the line is now a cycle path. It is part of Sustrans National Cycle Route no. 403.
