= Kellaways – West Tytherton, River Avon SSSI, Wiltshire =

Protected area in Wiltshire, England

Coordinates: 51.47393°N 2.08058°W

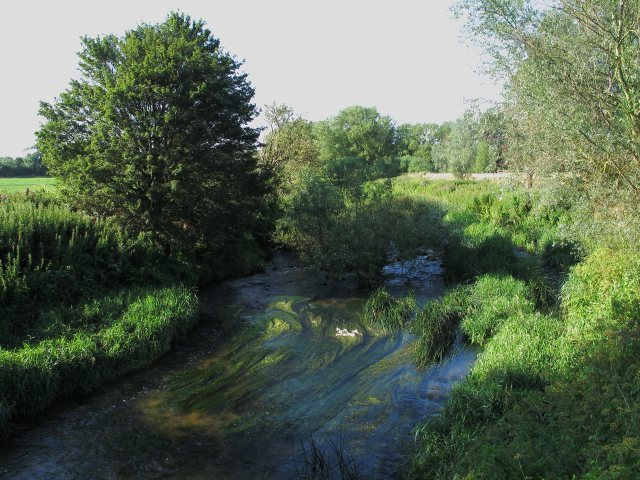
River Avon

Kellaways - West Tytherton, River Avon SSSI (grid reference ST945750) is a 4.1 hectare geological Site of Special Scientific Interest in Wiltshire, notified in 1998.

Located 3 miles (4.8 km) north east of Chippenham, this SSSI is of geological interest as the banks of the River Avon expose Callovian highly-fossiliferous sandstone which contains well-preserved bivalves, gastropods, brachiopods, belemnites and ammonites.
