= Spirthill =

Hamlet in Wiltshire, England

Coordinates: 51.481°N 2.004°W

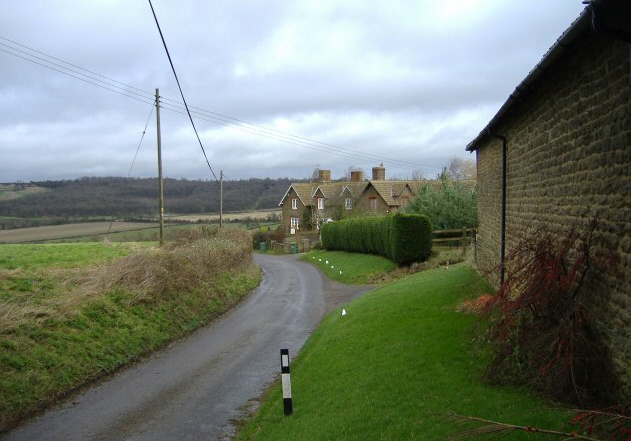
- Northeast Spirthill

- Location within Wiltshire
- Population: 23 (in 2011)
- OS grid reference: ST995756
- Civil parish: Bremhill
- Unitary authority: Wiltshire
- Ceremonial county: Wiltshire
- Region: South West
- Country: England
- Sovereign state: United Kingdom
- Post town: Calne
- Postcode district: SN11
- Dialling code: 01249
- Police: Wiltshire
- Fire: Dorset and Wiltshire
- Ambulance: South Western
- UK Parliament: Chippenham

Spirthill is a hamlet in the civil parish of Bremhill in Wiltshire, England, 2.5 miles (4.0 km) to the south of Lyneham. It is on top of a hill with views over the Avon valley and the towns of Calne and Chippenham can be seen from some points.

It is a quiet community of farmland and residential housing spread out along a narrow and unlit lane. There are 19 homes in the hamlet, including five farms with livestock or arable crops. The area was once part of the nearby Bowood Estate and can trace historical links back to the 16th Century. It is believed there were farms in the area around the Domesday time or before. There are no significant industrial activities in the hamlet and development is strictly controlled by local policy.

A Wesleyan Methodist chapel dated 1825 was built at Spirthill but is no longer in use.

The hamlet is served by Wessex Water; Scottish and Southern Electricity are responsible for the overhead mains power supplies. The BT exchange at Hilmarton serves the hamlet via overhead telephone lines. There is no sewerage service or mains gas supply to the hamlet. There are no shops, pub or telephone box, but there is a post box. There are no regular public transport services, the nearest bus stops being on the A3102 at the foot of Snow Hill which is about 2 miles away.
