= Chippenham railway station =

Railway station in Wiltshire, England

Chippenham
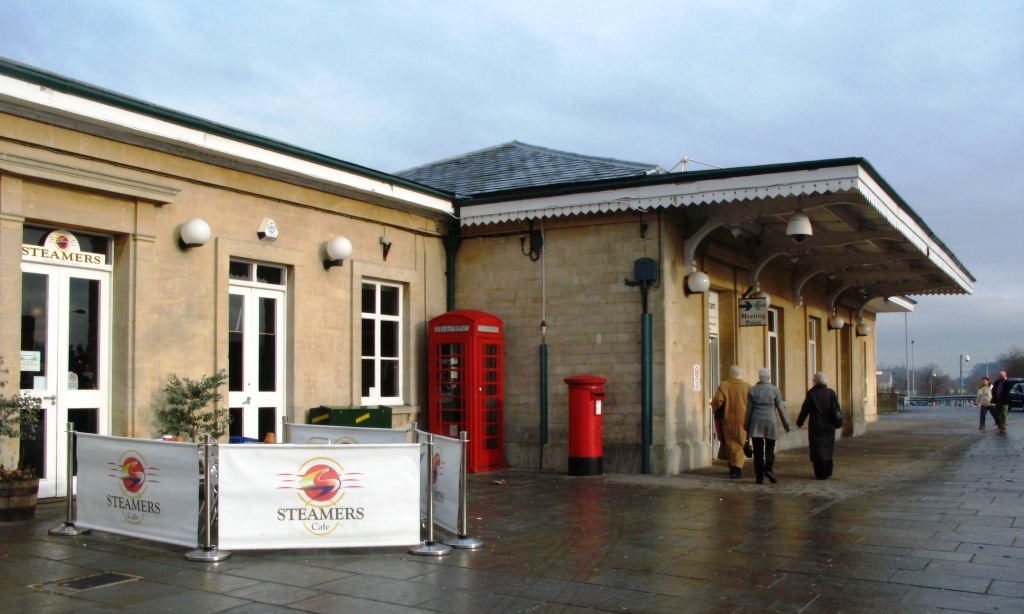
- The station buildings, seen from the southwest

General information
- Location: Chippenham, Wiltshire; England
- Coordinates: 51.4625°N 2.1154°W
- Grid reference: ST920737
- Owner: Network Rail
- Manager: Great Western Railway
- Platforms: 2

Other information
- Station code: CPM
- Classification: DfT category C1

History
- Original company: Great Western Railway
- Pre-grouping: Great Western Railway
- Post-grouping: Great Western Railway

Key dates
- 31 May 1841: Opened

Passengers
- 2021/22: ▲1.124 million
- Interchange: ▲24,205
- 2022/23: ▲1.445 million
- Interchange: ▲26,946
- 2023/24: ▲1.578 million
- Interchange: ▼22,518
- 2024/25: ▲1.714 million
- Interchange: ▲26,498
- 2025/26: ▲1.813 million
- Interchange: ▼26,181

Listed Building – Grade II
- Designated: 22 June 1978
- Reference no.: 1268119
- Legacy System: LBS
- Legacy System number: 462213
Location
Notes
- Passenger statistics from the Office of Rail and Road

Chippenham railway station is on the Great Western Main Line (GWML) in South West England, serving the town of Chippenham, Wiltshire. It is 93 miles 76 chains (93.95 mi; 151.2 km) down the line from the zero point at London Paddington and is situated between Swindon and Bath Spa on the GWML. The Wessex Main Line diverges from the GWML to the southwest of Chippenham and runs to Trowbridge via Melksham.

The station is managed by Great Western Railway, which also operates all the trains that call. Only two platforms remain in use; the platform by the main entrance is now disused.

== History ==
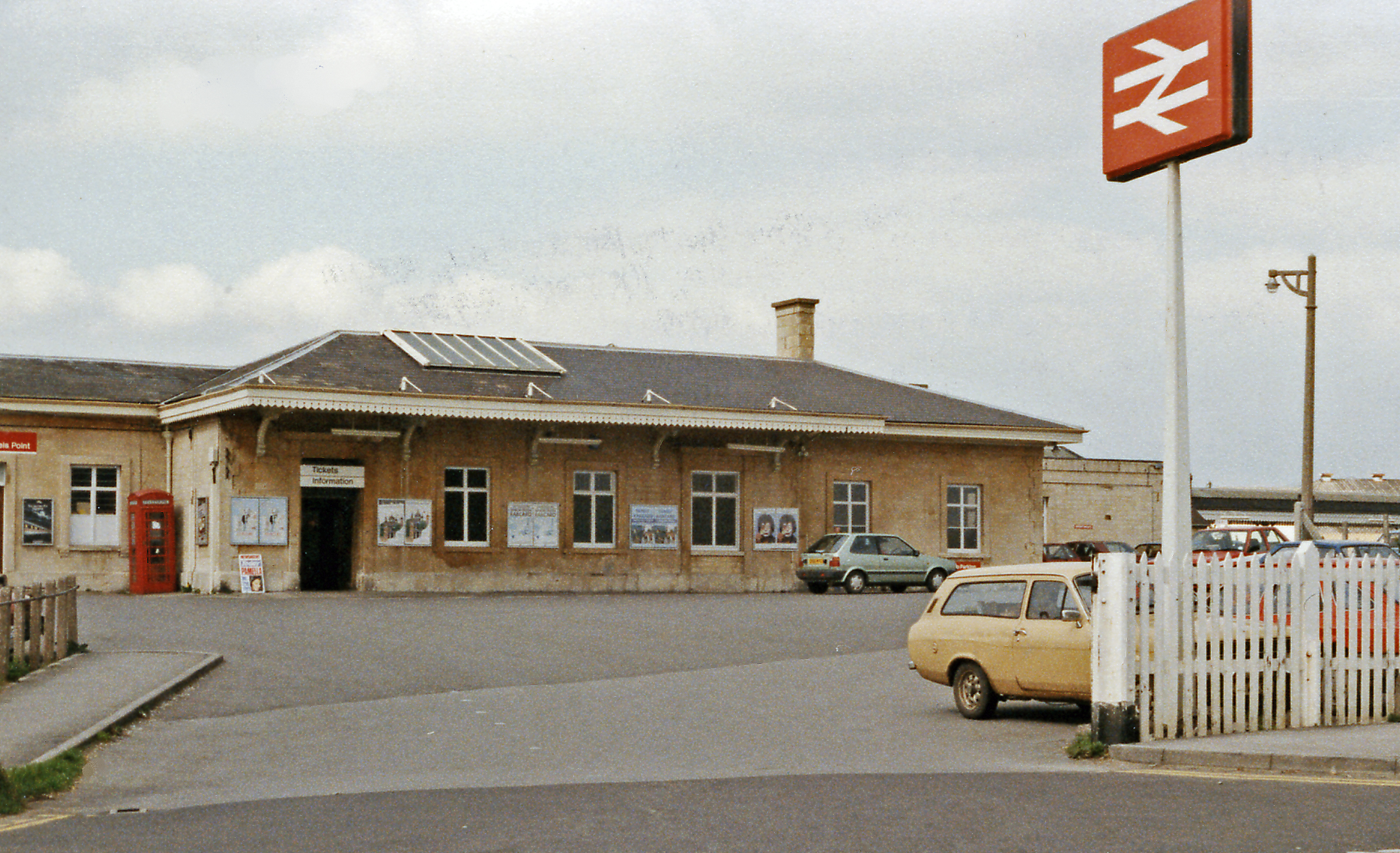
Station entrance (1989)

The main line of the Great Western Railway (GWR) was authorised in 1835, and opened in stages: the section from Hay Lane westward to Chippenham opened on 31 May 1841. The final section of the line, between Chippenham and Bath, opened on 30 June 1841.

Chippenham was soon served by other lines. The Wilts, Somerset and Weymouth Railway (WS&WR) was authorised in 1845 and the first section opened on 5 September 1848; this ran from Thingley Junction, west of Chippenham, to Westbury, and the WS&WR was absorbed by the GWR in 1851. The Calne Railway was authorised in 1860 and opened on 3 November 1863; this company remained independent for some years, until absorbed by the GWR in 1892.

In 1858 the station was expanded and gained a goods shed and an engine shed. A railway connection was laid to Chippenham Gas Works in 1906; this connection closed in 1932. Chippenham engine shed closed in March 1964 and services on the Calne branch ended in 1965. Chippenham East and West signal boxes closed on 21 August 1966. As from 1 February 1976 the original down platform was taken out of use and services travelling west used the south side of the island platform.

== Description ==
The original station building at Chippenham was built to Isambard Kingdom Brunel's design and opened in 1841. With the subsequent opening of lines to Salisbury and Weymouth, the station was not adequate to meet the increased demand and was redesigned by J H Bertram in 1856 to 1858; it is a Grade II listed building, constructed in Bath Stone ashlar with a bay window at one end and a wing at the other, making a long, low composition. The weathered canopies were replaced in 2026.

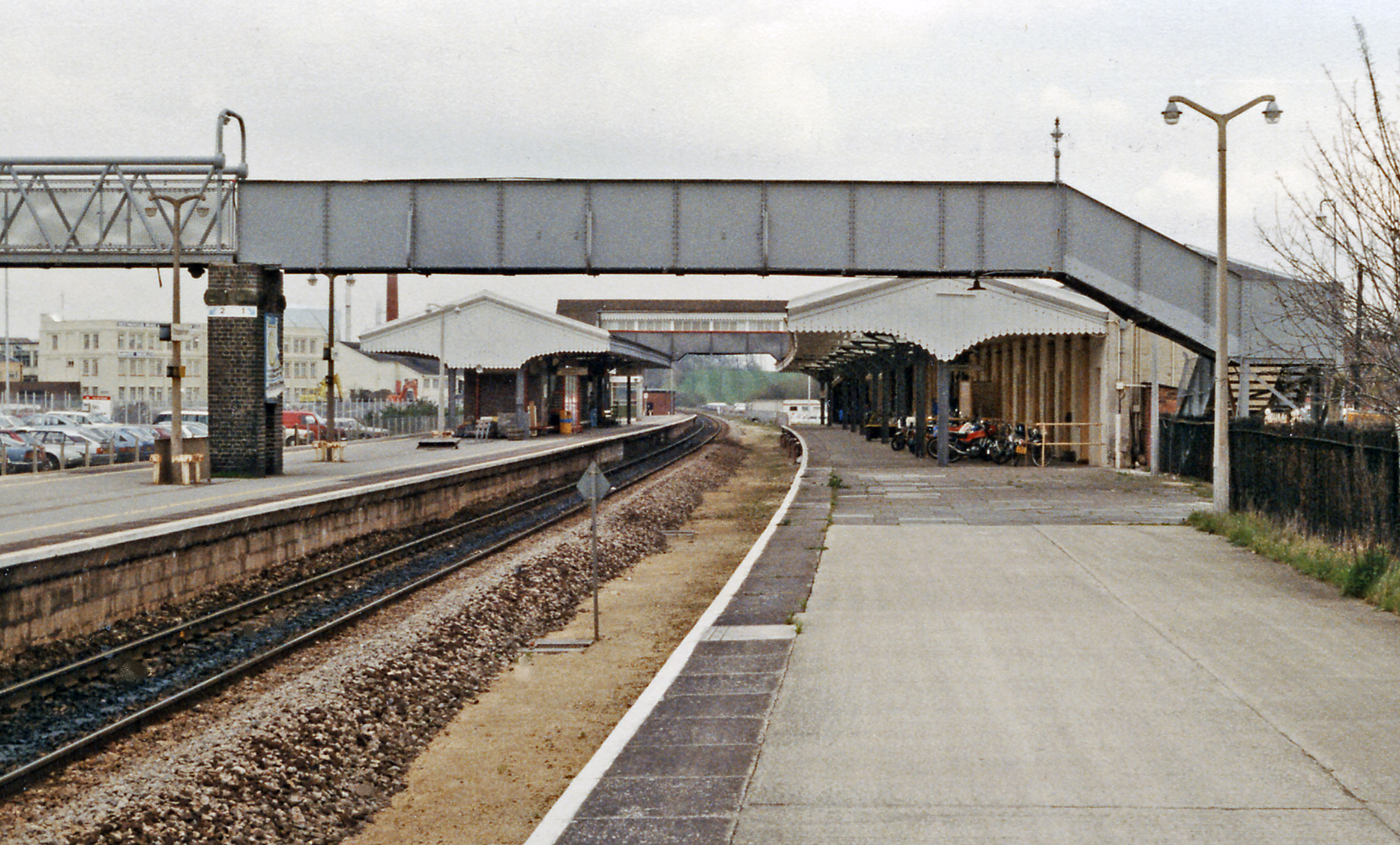
Platform view in 1989. The footbridge carried a public right of way over the railway, and has since been replaced with a taller bridge providing access to the two operational platforms.

Platform 1 is used for westbound Great Western Main Line services towards Bristol Temple Meads, the West Country and South Wales, and for Wessex Main Line services towards Southampton Central. Platform 2 is used for eastbound services towards London Paddington and Cheltenham Spa. On the disused platform there is cycle storage, a seating area and a café.

There are two footbridges at the station, although until 2016 one only carried a right of way over the railway. This bridge was replaced with a new one providing steps and lifts on both platforms, opening in January 2016. This work was funded under the Department for Transport's Access for All scheme, although in any case the bridge required replacement as part of the project to electrify the Great Western main line, as it was too low for the overhead wires to fit underneath. The footbridge was closed for two weeks in September 2016, eight months after opening, due to drainage issues. It had also been criticised as no lift was provided to the car park to the north of the station, although provision was made for its installation in the future. In 2022, work to install the third lift began.

Beside the station is a Grade II listed K6 Red telephone box. In the old station yard to the south of the railway (now a car park) there is a Grade II listed Brunel-designed stone-built office. In the northern station yard (also now a car park) is another Grade II listed building, partly in random stone but mainly weather-boarded on a timber frame with a pitched slate roof. It is an early weighbridge house and coal merchant's office dating from around 1840, and may have belonged to Rowland Brotherhood's engineering works. The Grade II* listed Chippenham viaduct, also designed by Brunel, is detailed below.

== Awards ==
In 2004, the station received an award to recognise its safety and security. The award, which lasted for two years, followed a passenger survey which found that 98% of the passengers through Chippenham said they felt 'safe' or 'very safe' whilst on the premises. The station is monitored by 24-hour CCTV and is alarmed.

== Services ==
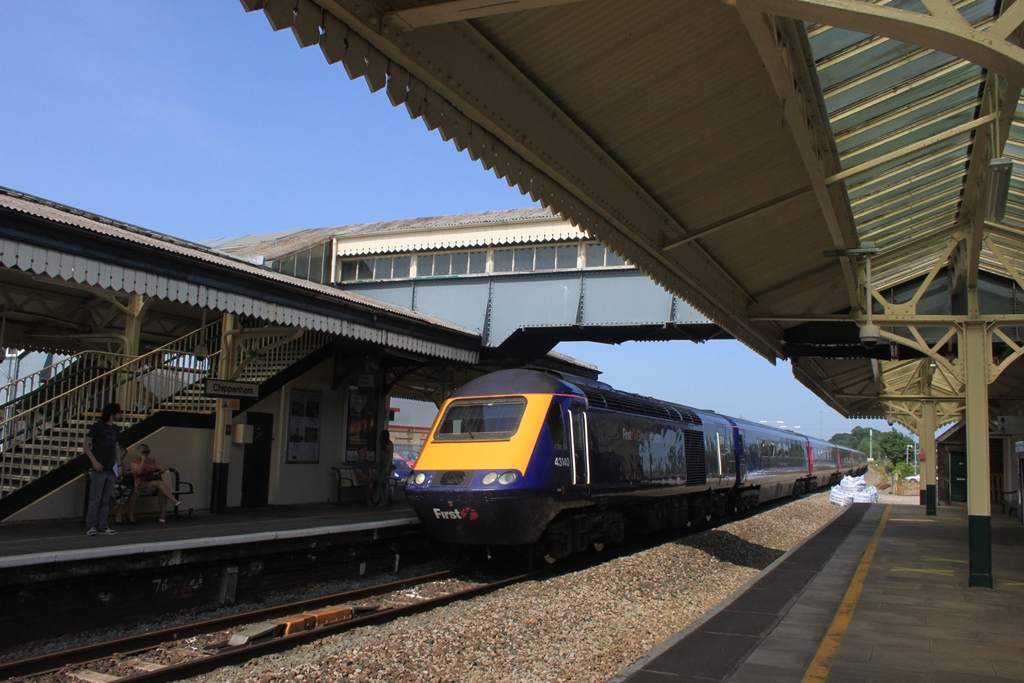
A First Great Western service from London Paddington

The station has frequent eastbound services to London Paddington; and westbound services to Bristol and Bath, with some extensions to Devon, Taunton, and South Wales. Currently, these trains run every half an hour in both directions and extensions to stations further afield westbound are made regularly.

The "TransWilts" line from Swindon via Chippenham to Melksham, Trowbridge and Westbury has trains every two hours each way on weekdays and six each way on Sundays. Two southbound weekday trains continue through to Salisbury and two northbound to Cheltenham Spa, with one each extending to Southampton Central in the south and Worcester Foregate Street in the north via the Bristol-Worcester Line. On Sunday, in addition to another Salisbury service three trains run to Frome, of which two utilise the rest of the Heart of Wessex Line and terminate at Weymouth on the south coast.

Chippenham station connects to the Wessex Main Line via Melksham.

Preceding station	National Rail	Following station
Bath Spa	Great Western Railway; Great Western Main Line	Swindon
Melksham	Great Western Railway; Wessex Main Line	Swindon
	Historical railways	
Corsham; Line open, station closed	Great Western Railway; Great Western Main Line	Christian Malford Halt; Line open, station closed
	Disused railways	
Terminus	BR (Western Region); Chippenham and Calne Line	Stanley Bridge Halt

== Future ==
There were plans to electrify the Great Western Main Line along its whole length (Heathrow Junction to Bristol Temple Meads), which were originally scheduled for completion by 2016. However, in November 2016, the work to electrify the section between Chippenham and Bristol (as well as Oxford to Didcot) was suspended due to 'cost overruns' until further notice. The wires stop just east of Chippenham station.

Train operator Go-Op included Chippenham in its 2016 and 2019 plans for a service from the west of England to the West Midlands, via Oxford.

The Chippenham Station Hub project aims to improve the appearance of the station's forecourt and increase parking provision by building multi-storey car parks, releasing land for development. There are seven phases, with Phase 1, the refurbishment of the booking office, having been completed and Phase 2 (redevelopment of Sadler's Mead car park) being in progress as of 2020.

== Engineering works ==
Northwest of the station is an engineering works, established on a smaller site north of the station in 1842 by Rowland Brotherhood to support the Great Western Railway, and later supplying equipment to the worldwide rail industry. From 1894 it was home to the company which in 1935 became Westinghouse Brake and Signal, manufacturers of railway air braking and signalling equipment. Westinghouse was acquired by Hawker Siddeley in 1979, then sold to BTR in 1992. After BTR merged with Siebe to form Invensys, Westinghouse Brakes was sold in 2000 to Knorr-Bremse, who opened a new factory at Bowerhill, Melksham.

The signals business remained at Chippenham and became Westinghouse Rail Systems, within Invensys Rail Group. This business was sold to Siemens in 2013 and became part of Siemens Rail Automation. Proposals submitted in 2016 for redevelopment of the site include homes, shops and a hotel as well as business space.

== Chippenham viaduct ==
Chippenham viaduct
- Coordinates: 51.46121°N 2.11921°W
- OS grid reference: ST 91815 73588
- Carries: Railway
- Crosses: A420, New Road
- Locale: Chippenham
- Owner: Network Rail

Characteristics
- Design: Arch
- Material: Stone, brick
- No. of spans: 9

History
- Designer: Isambard Kingdom Brunel
- Opened: 1841

Statistics

Listed Building – Grade II*
- Designated: 22 June 1978
- Reference no.: 1267956
- Legacy System: LBS
- Legacy System number: 462388

Immediately west of the station lies the Grade II* listed Chippenham viaduct, designed by Brunel and completed in 1841. The first arch, over New Road, appears to have been modelled on the Roman triumphal arch. It has a 26-foot (8 m) span and is flanked by two smaller pedestrian arches of 10 feet (3 m), and extended to the west by a later brick arcade, making a total of nine arches. All is surmounted by a heavy cornice and parapet. The north side is faced with Bath stone ashlar with some brick patching, while the south side is in blue brick following widening in the early 1900s. Chippenham Civic Society has placed a blue plaque on the viaduct, which it refers to as the "Western Arches".
