= Counsell =

Counsell is a surname. Notable people with the surname include:

- Craig Counsell (born 1970), American baseball player
- D'Arcy Argue Counsell Martin (1898–1992), Ontario lawyer and political figure
- Duaine Counsell (1920–2012), American football and baseball coach
- Elizabeth Counsell (born 1942), English actress
- Eos Counsell (born 1976), Welsh violinist
- Frank Counsell (1864–1933), Australian architect
- Garth Counsell, South African Anglican archbishop
- Harry Counsell (1909–1990), English footballer
- John Counsell (pastor) (born 1959), Canadian broadcaster and pastor
- John Counsell (theatre director) (1905–1987), English actor, director and theatre manager
- Marilyn Trenholme Counsell (born 1933), Canadian Senator
- Melanie Counsell (born 1964), Welsh filmmaker, installation artist and sculptor

== See also ==
- Late Night Counsell, radio talk show
