= Jean Miller =

English actress and painter (1929–2014)

- Born: 12 August 1929; Saint Helier, Jersey
- Died: 10 January 2014 (aged 84)
- Education: Guildford School of Acting
- Occupations: Stage actress and painter

Jean Miller (12 August 1929 – 10 January 2014) was an English actress and painter. She began her career at the Theatre Royal, Windsor which was then run by her aunt and uncle Mary Kerridge and John Counsell. There she met her husband, Michael Miller, with whom she had a son and two daughters. She performed on the West End, toured with Dame Flora Robson, and acted Shakespeare at the Festival of Britain. In later life she became a successful painter, with Sir Arnold Wesker (an avid collector) describing her as “a life-enhancer”, and the artist Cecily Sash calling her “a kind of Matisse on speed”. She died after an eight-year struggle with breast cancer in 2014.
