= John Counsell =

John Counsell may refer to:

- John Counsell (theatre director) (1905–1987), English actor, director and theatre manager
- John Counsell (pastor), Canadian pastor and broadcaster
