= Grand Jury (disambiguation) =

A grand jury is a group of citizens empowered by law to determine whether criminal charges should be brought on an accused.

Grand Jury may also refer to:

- Grand Jury (film), a 1936 film
- Grand Jury (TV series)

== See also ==
- Jury (disambiguation)
