= David Simeon =

British actor

- Born: David John Townsend; 17 May 1943 (age 83); Chippenham, Wiltshire, England
- Occupation: Actor
- Years active: 1964 – present
- Spouse: Elizabeth Counsell (m. 1978)
- Children: 1
- Relatives: Mary Kerridge (mother-in-law); John Counsell (father-in-law)

David John Townsend (born 17 May 1943, Chippenham, Wiltshire), known professionally as David Simeon, is a British actor.

== Career ==
David Simeon began his acting career after being accepted into RADA, the Rose Bruford College and the Guildhall School of Music and Drama. Ultimately he chose the latter and completed his training in 1964. After years working in Wiltshire rep and Birmingham rep, Simeon began working extensively in theatre and television from the late 1960s.

His first television role was as a murderer in Sexton Blake, which Simeon puts down to his honest face being the reason for his casting. From this point he moved to London and continued working in theatre in between television roles, which by the early 1970s were becoming plentiful. Among these were small parts in the Doctor Who serials Inferno (1970) and The Dæmons (1971), which Simeon now says despite his vast experience, "I’m now known as being in Doctor Who".

During the 1970s he secured guest roles in television series such as Paul Temple, Z-Cars, Fawlty Towers, The Pathfinders and The Liver Birds. In 1973 he starred in his first major regular role as Detective Constable Mickey Finn in Hunter's Walk, appearing in 38 episodes until 1976.

From 1980 onwards he continued to gain further regular roles in television series End of Part One (1979–80) impersonating television personalities such as Frank Muir and Derek Batey, Vice Versa (1981) as Mr Blinkhorn, Coronation Street (December 1981) as sales rep Bobby Simpson - love interest of Bet Lynch & Mavis Riley, The New Adventures of Lucky Jim (1982) as Philip Lassiter, Jury (1983) as David Farrell. He also appeared in several episodes of the hospital drama Angels.

In 1988 he had a role in the hit John Cleese film A Fish Called Wanda. During the 1990s and 2000s he continued extensively in theatre and on television appearing in Coronation Street as Gareth Bird, a hospital consultant in July 1998, Casualty, EastEnders and The Bill. He also secured another recurring role in Lucy Sullivan Is Getting Married as Ken Kennedy between 1999 and 2000.

== Personal life ==
Simeon married the actress Elizabeth Counsell (daughter of John Counsell and Mary Kerridge) in 1978 and had a son in 1979.
