= Yelde Hall =

Municipal building in Chippenham, Wiltshire, England

The Yelde Hall
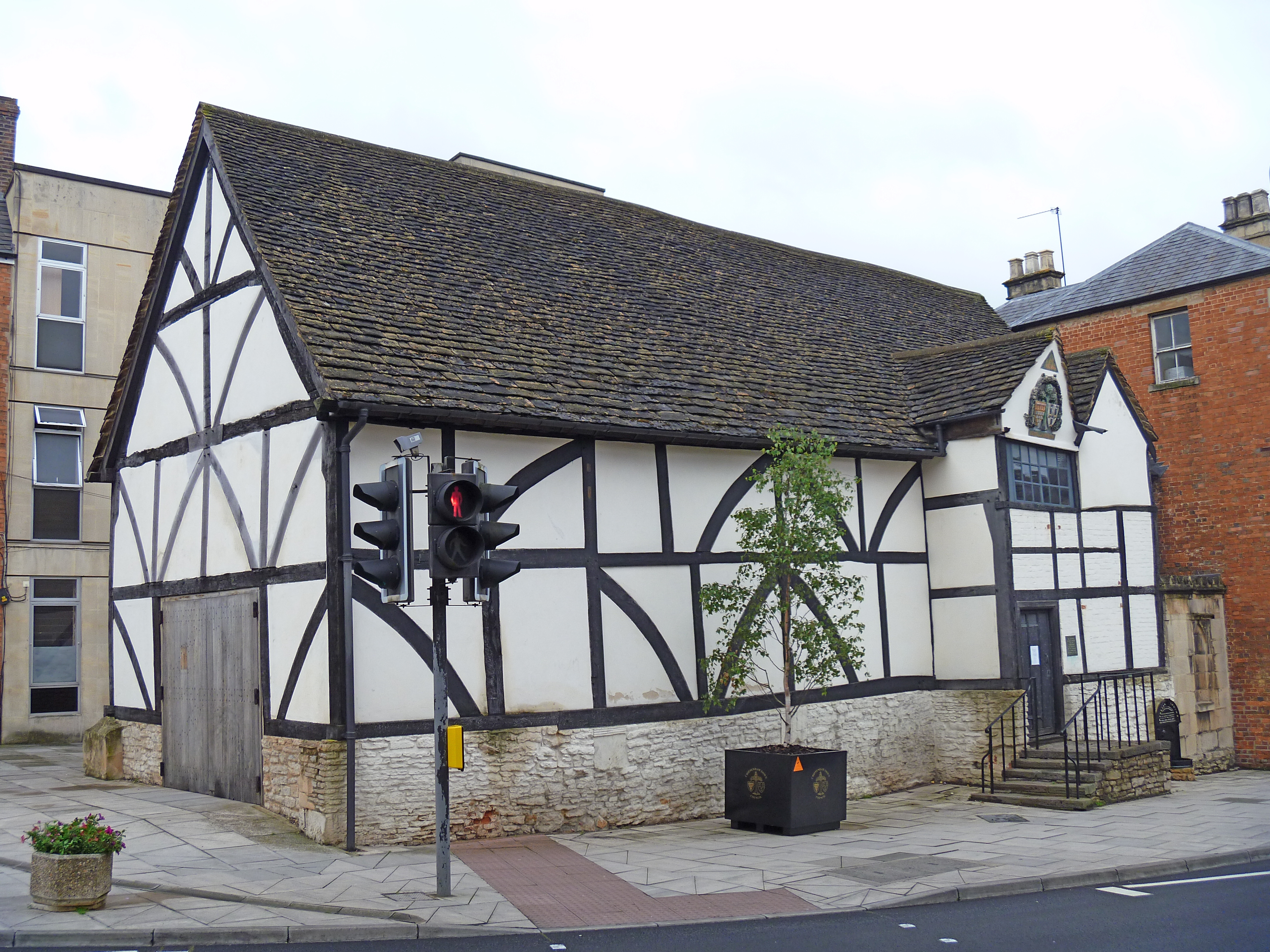
- The Yelde Hall

- Shown in Wiltshire
- 51.45804°N 2.11387°W
- Location: Market Place, Chippenham

History
- Built: 1450

Site notes
- Architectural style: Medieval style

Listed Building – Grade I
- Official name: The Yelde Hall and the Council Chamber
- Designated: 25 April 1950
- Reference no.: 1267996

The Yelde Hall is a public facility in the Market Place, in Chippenham, Wiltshire, England. The building, which was the meeting place of Chippenham Borough Council, is a Grade I listed building.

== History ==
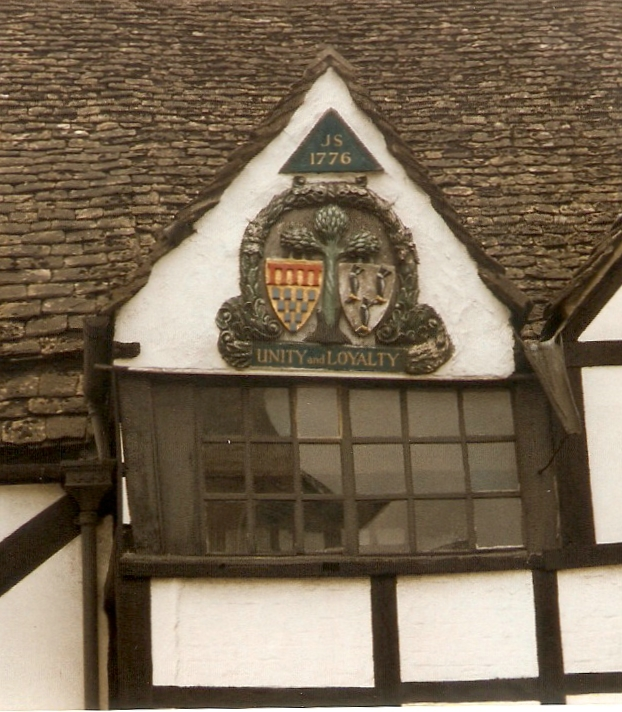
Town arms from 1776, on the Yelde Hall

The hall was built in around 1450. The design involved an asymmetrical main frontage facing onto the Market Place with the right hand section projected forward; the right hand section, which consisted of two bays, featured a short flight of steps leading up to a doorway in the left bay with a horizontal window above the doorway and two small gables above that. The left hand gable contained a carving of the town arms with the inscription "JS 1776": the initials refer to John Scott who was the bailiff at that time. The right hand gable at one time contained a clock which was taken down in 1851.

The building was originally used as a jail (in the cellar), as a courtroom (on the ground floor) and as a council chamber (upstairs). The Chippenham Savings Bank operated an office in the building on Saturday mornings from 1822.

Following the relocation of the town council and burgess to Chippenham Town Hall in 1834, the building became the drill hall for the Chippenham Volunteer Rifle Corps in 1846. The unit evolved to become B Company, 2nd Volunteer Battalion, The Wiltshire Regiment in 1881 and B Company, 4th Battalion, the Duke of Edinburgh's Wiltshire Regiment in 1908. The regiment vacated the building when it relocated to the Little Ivy in 1911. However, the building was also used as the headquarters of the Royal Wiltshire Yeomanry at this time, and continued to be a yeomanry drill hall until the yeomanry moved its headquarters to Trowbridge in 1920.

The Fire Brigade used the east end of the building from 1870 and then almost the whole building from 1911 to 1945. After some restoration work in the 1950s, the building served as the Chippenham Museum from October 1963 until it relocated to the Market Place in 1999.

Following a refurbishment, the building then became the North Wiltshire Tourist Information Centre in March 2003 although that concern relocated to a unit adjacent to the town hall in February 2012. It underwent a further refurbishment in March 2012 and then re-opened to the public as an extension of the Chippenham Museum and Heritage Centre in April 2012.

== See also ==
- List of Grade I listed buildings in Wiltshire
