= Chippenham =

Market town in Wiltshire, England

Coordinates: 51.459°N 2.116°W

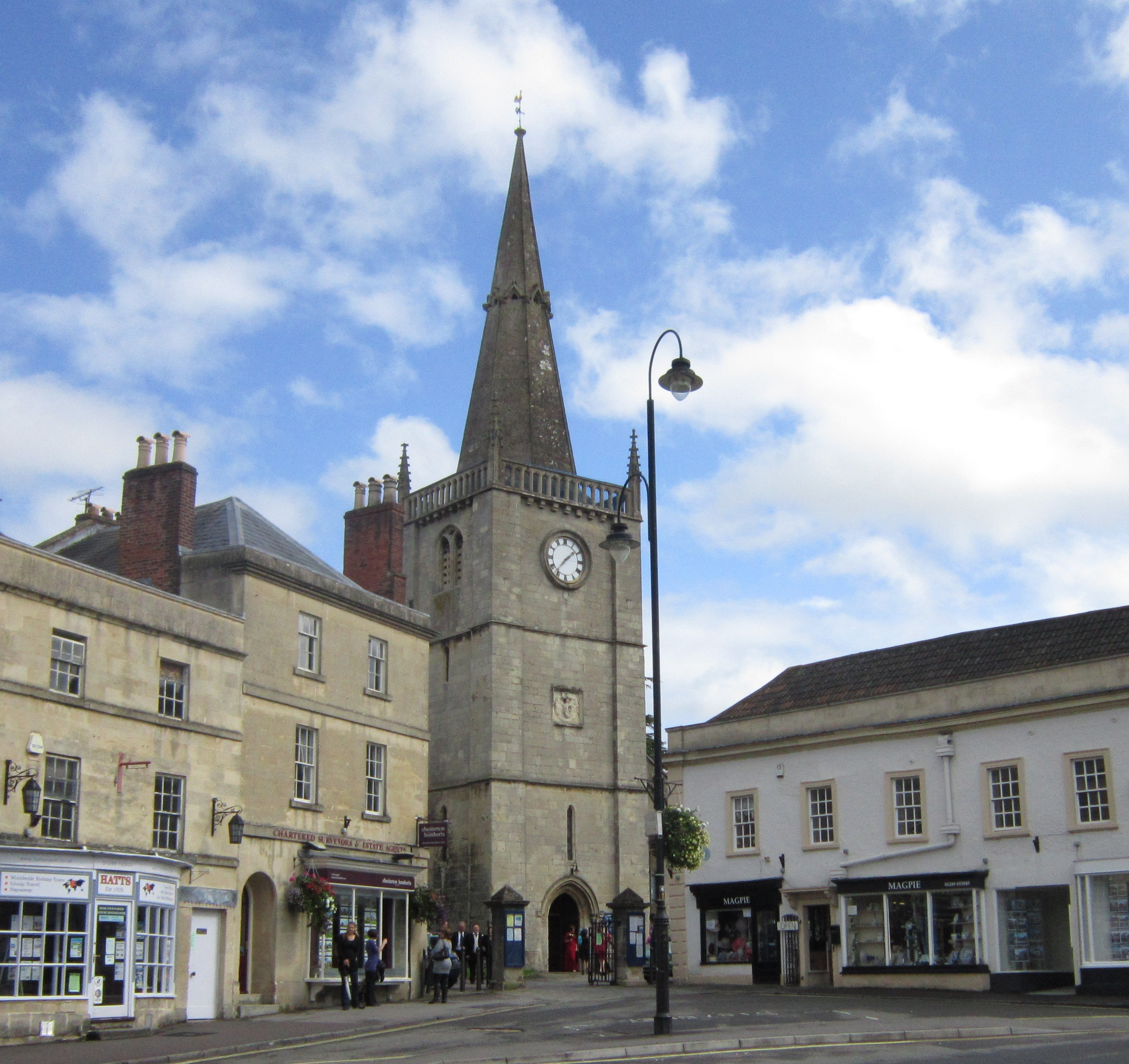
- St Andrew's Church, Chippenham

- Location within Wiltshire
- Area: 158.42 km^{2} (61.17 sq mi)
- Population: 36,548 (2021 Census)
  - Density: 231/km^{2} (600/sq mi)
- OS grid reference: ST919733
  - London: 86 mi (138 km)
- Civil parish: Chippenham
- Unitary authority: Wiltshire
- Ceremonial county: Wiltshire
- Region: South West
- Country: England
- Sovereign state: United Kingdom
- Post town: CHIPPENHAM
- Postcode district: SN14, SN15
- Dialling code: 01249
- UK Parliament: Chippenham
- Website: www.chippenham.gov.uk

Chippenham is a market town and civil parish in north-west Wiltshire, England. It lies 13 miles (21 km) north-east of Bath, 86 miles (138 km) west of London and is near the Cotswolds Area of Outstanding Natural Beauty. The town was established on a crossing of the River Avon, where some form of settlement is believed to have existed since before Roman times. It was a royal vill and probably a royal hunting lodge, under Alfred the Great. The town continued to grow when the Great Western Railway arrived in 1841. In 2021 the parish had a population of 36,548.

== History ==
=== Etymology ===
The Anglo-Saxon Chronicle records the town as Cippanhamme: this could refer to a person called Cippa who had his hamm, an enclosure in a river meadow. An alternative theory suggests that the name is derived from the Anglo-Saxon word ceap, meaning 'market'. The name is recorded variously as Cippanhamm (878), Cepen (1042), Cheppeham (1155), Chippenham (1227), Shippenham (1319) and Chippyngham (1541). In John Speed's map of Wiltshire (1611), the name is spelt both "Chippenham" (for the hundred) and "Chipnam" (for the town).

=== Early settlements ===
Remains of Romano-British settlements are visible in the wall behind the former magistrates' court, and recent redevelopments of the town have shown up other evidence of early settlements.

The town (not counting the Roman villages now within its boundaries) is believed to have been founded by Anglo-Saxons around AD 600. The first record of the town dates from 853, when Æthelswith, daughter of King Æthelwulf of Wessex was given in marriage to King Burgred of Mercia at the ‘royal estate (villa regia) called Chippenham, and the marriage was conducted in royal style’. According to Bishop Asser's Life of King Alfred, Chippenham was, under Alfred's reign, a royal vill; historians have also argued, from its proximity to the royal forests at Melksham and Barden, that it was probably a hunting lodge.

Danish Vikings successfully besieged Chippenham in 878. Later that year, at the Battle of Ethandun, Alfred decisively defeated the Danes, whose forces then surrendered to Alfred at Chippenham (ushering in the establishment of the Danelaw).

In 1042, the royal holding in Chippenham makes mention of a church. The 1086 Domesday Book listed Chippenham as Chepeham, with a substantial population of 177 households.

=== High and Late Medieval ===
In Norman times, the royal properties were separated into the manors of Sheldon, Rowden and Lowden. Records show that the town expanded into Langstret (now the Causeway) from 1245, and from 1406 into Le Newstret (now the New Road area of town). Throughout this period, Chippenham continued to have a thriving market in the town centre.

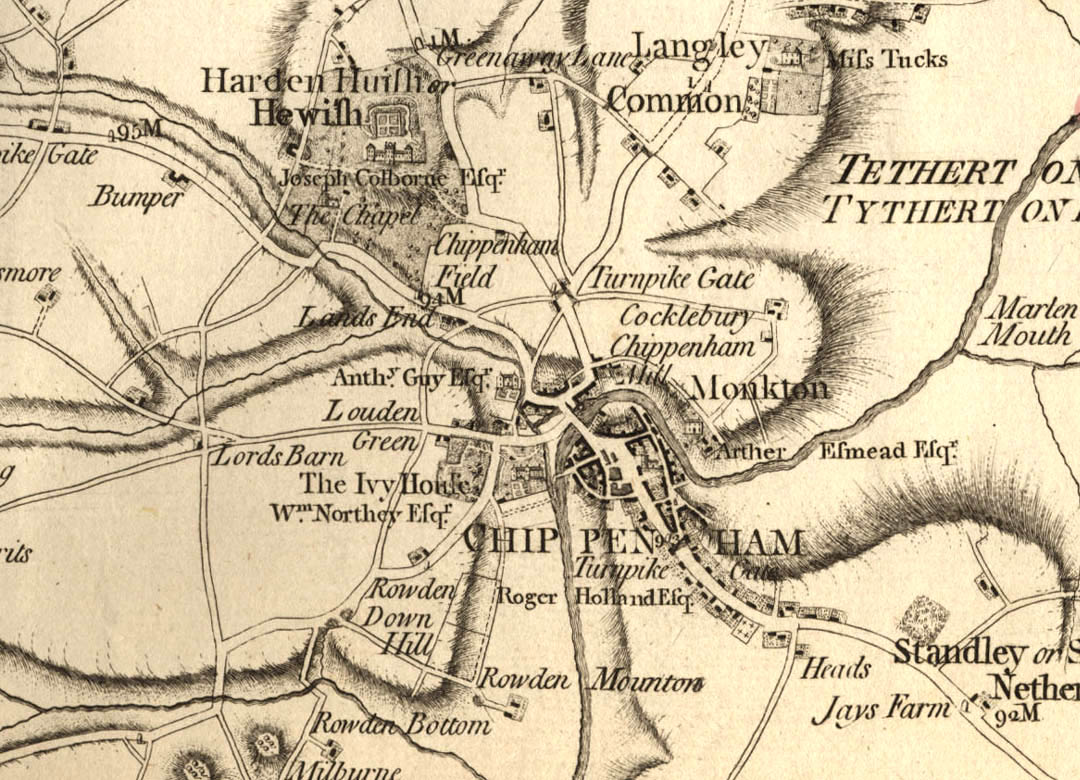
A map of Chippenham from 1773

The A4 that runs through Chippenham incorporates parts of the 14th-century medieval road network that linked London to Bristol. This was an important road for the English cloth trade, and so its upkeep was funded in part by Bristol cloth merchants.

Chippenham was represented in the Parliament of England from 1295, and Queen Mary granted the town a Charter of Incorporation in 1554.

Analysis of the wood used to build the Yelde Hall indicates that the market hall was built around 1450. The Shambles and Buttercross were built after 1570. The Shambles were destroyed in a fire in 1856 but the Yelde Hall survived.

The parish of Chippenham Without encompasses the deserted medieval village of Sheldon, devastated by plague; all that remains today is Sheldon Manor, Wiltshire's oldest inhabited manor house, dating from 1282.

=== 16th to 18th centuries ===
The wool industry took off in the 16th century, partly due to the river. The plague hit the town hard in 1611 and 1636. This, a recession in the woollen industry, and a drop in corn production in 1622 and 1623, caused massive hardship for the town's population. The trade in cloth faced further problems during the English Civil War due to a Royalist proclamation that prohibited the sale of cloth to the Parliamentarian-controlled London.

In 1747, a bribery and corruption scandal (involving two members of parliament for Chippenham) led to the downfall of Sir Robert Walpole's government.

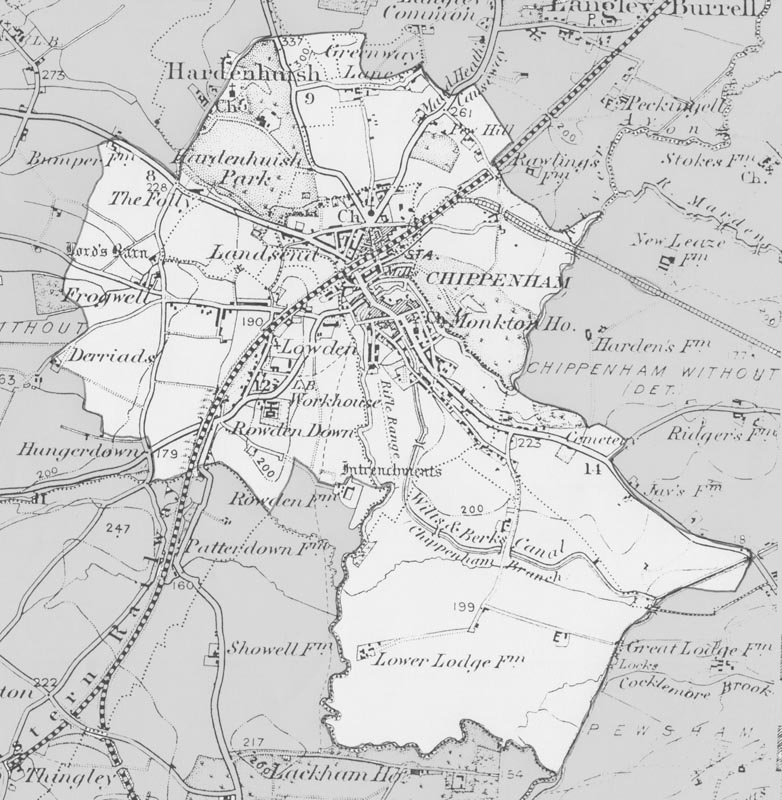
An OS map of Chippenham from 1896

=== 19th and 20th centuries ===
A branch to Chippenham off the Wilts & Berks Canal was built in 1798, terminating at a wharf at Timber Street near the marketplace; the main commodity traded was coal. The site of the wharf is now the town's bus station, and part of Pewsham Way follows the line of the branch. The Great Western Railway arrived in Chippenham in 1841, and in turn attracted many new businesses. The arrival of these businesses required new housing which led to the expansion of the town into land north of the railway, which in turn led to the growth of further industries to support the building work.

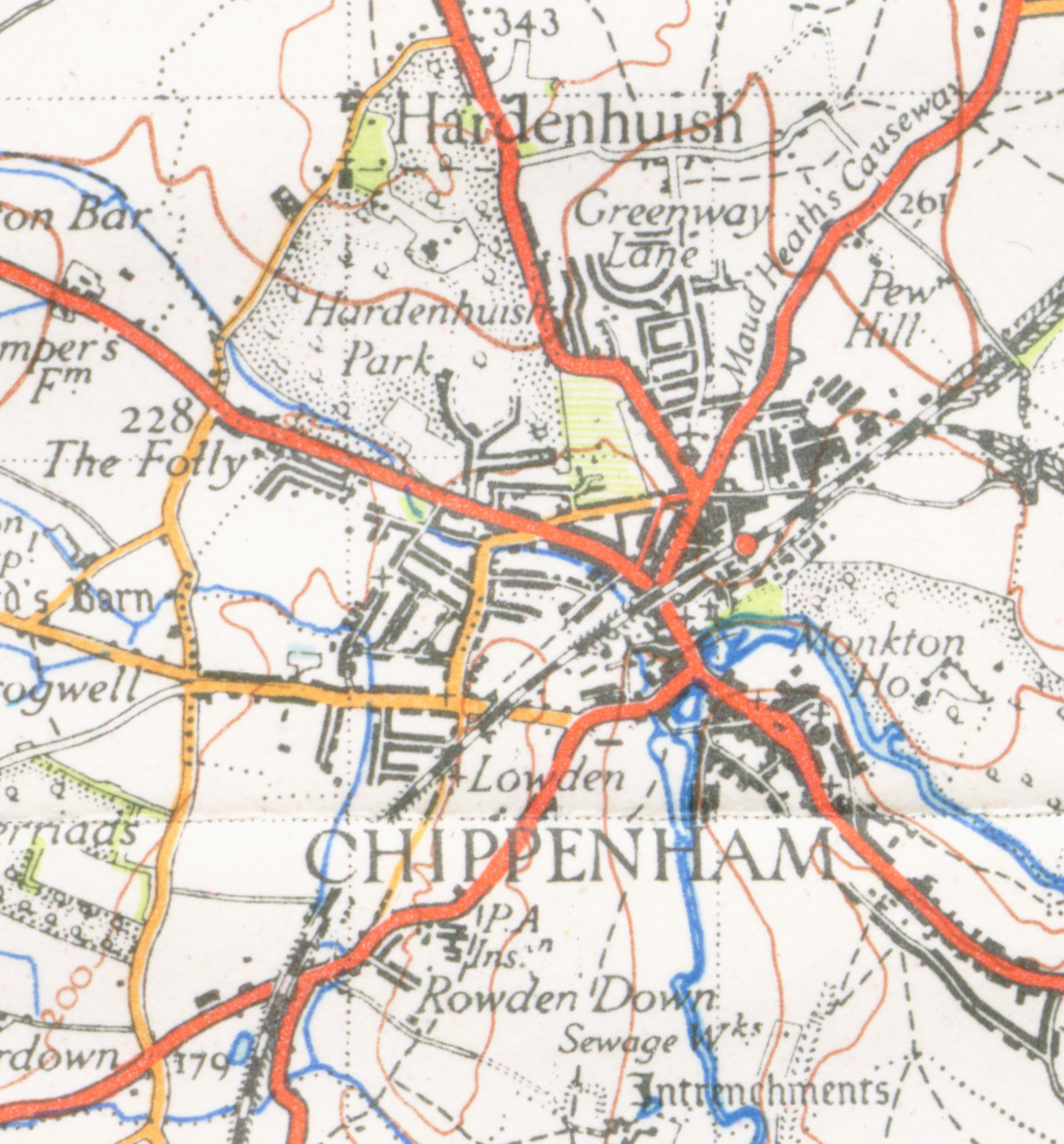
An OS map of Chippenham from 1946

The arrival of the railway promoted the growth of industrial agricultural businesses. In the middle of the 19th century, Chippenham was a major centre for the production of dairy and ham products; this led, later, to Nestlé and Matteson's having factories in the town centre. The railway also led to the growth of railway engineering works in Chippenham: the first of these was Roland Brotherhood in 1842. A variety of companies then took over part or all of the business on the site, until in 1935 Westinghouse Brake and Signal Company Ltd took over the site fully. The signalling side of the business remains at the Chippenham site and is now owned by Siemens Rail Automation Group; the brakes business was taken over by the German company Knorr-Bremse, and is in nearby Melksham.

On 17 April 1960, American singers Eddie Cochran and Gene Vincent, and songwriter Sharon Sheeley, were involved in a car crash in Chippenham at Rowden Hill. Cochran died as a result of his injuries and a memorial plaque was erected near the site.

On 13 February 1998, two unexploded bombs from World War II were discovered in the field behind Hardens Mead during preparations for the building of Abbeyfield School. About 1,100 residents in the east of Chippenham had to be evacuated for two nights until the army carried out a controlled explosion. The Army initially tried to defuse the larger 750 kg (1,650 lb) device, but it was decided that owing to the bomb's orientation in the ground this would be too dangerous.

== Geography ==
=== Location ===
Chippenham is in western Wiltshire, at a prominent crossing of the River Avon. It is located between the Marlborough Downs to the east, the southern Cotswolds to the north and west, and Salisbury Plain to the south-east.

The town is surrounded by sparsely populated countryside and there are several woodlands in or very near the town, such as Bird's Marsh, Vincients Wood and Briars Wood.

=== Suburbs ===
Suburbs include Cepen Park (North & South), Hardenhuish, Monkton, Lowden, Pewsham, Primrose Hill, Englands, Frogwell, Derriads, The Folly, Redland, Queens Crescent, Lackham, Fenway Park and Hill Rise; these loosely correspond to local government wards.

=== Landmarks ===
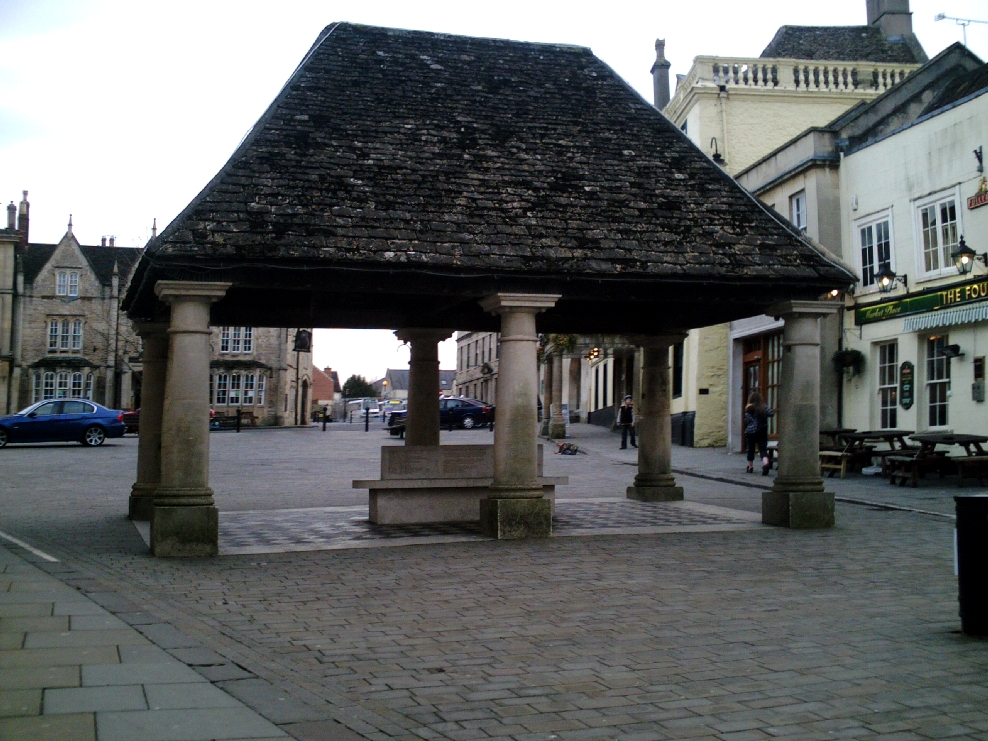
The Buttercross today

The original Buttercross, a stone structure, was erected in c. 1570 and stood at the centre of the Shambles at the current location of Barclays Bank. It was used for the sale of meat and dairy products. In 1889, Mr E.C. Lowndes bought the structure for £6 and re-erected it as a gazebo in the kitchen garden of the manor house at Castle Combe, where it fell into disrepair. The Buttercross was re-erected in 1995 by the Chippenham Civic Society, funded by many local people and organisations. It currently stands as the centre-piece of the pedestrianised area of the town centre, where a market is held each Friday and Saturday.

The Yelde Hall is one of very few remaining medieval timber framed buildings in the town. It originally was divided internally for use as a market hall. Both the hall and its meeting room upstairs were used by the burgess and bailiff for a variety of meetings and trials as well as for Council meetings. The space under the Council Chamber was used as the town jail.

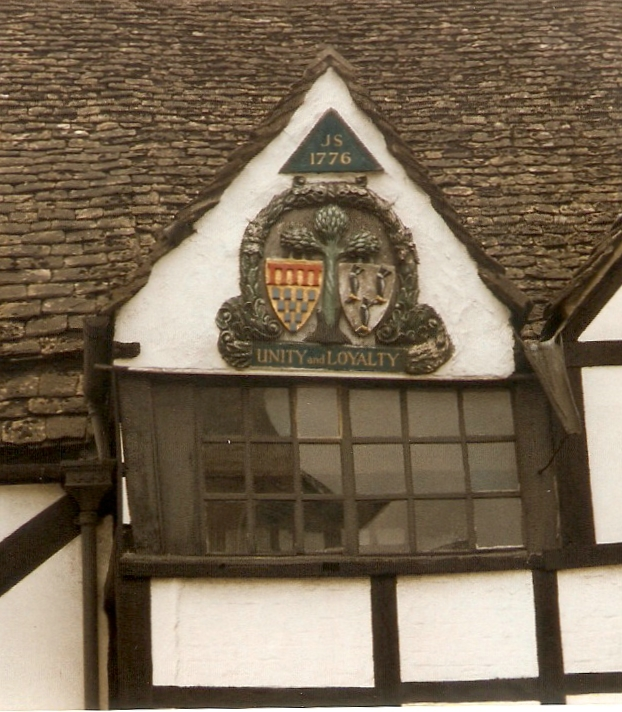
Town arms from 1776 on the Yelde Hall

=== Climate ===
Climate data for Lyneham, 145m asl (1991–2020 normals, extremes 1957–present)
Month	Jan	Feb	Mar	Apr	May	Jun	Jul	Aug	Sep	Oct	Nov	Dec	Year
Record high °C (°F)	13.7 (56.7)	18.1 (64.6)	21.1 (70.0)	25.3 (77.5)	31.7 (89.1)	34.0 (93.2)	34.9 (94.8)	34.9 (94.8)	29.5 (85.1)	26.5 (79.7)	17.2 (63.0)	14.7 (58.5)	34.9 (94.8)
Mean daily maximum °C (°F)	7.2 (45.0)	7.7 (45.9)	10.2 (50.4)	13.2 (55.8)	16.4 (61.5)	19.4 (66.9)	21.5 (70.7)	21.0 (69.8)	18.3 (64.9)	14.2 (57.6)	10.1 (50.2)	7.5 (45.5)	13.9 (57.0)
Daily mean °C (°F)	4.4 (39.9)	4.6 (40.3)	6.6 (43.9)	8.9 (48.0)	12.0 (53.6)	14.9 (58.8)	16.9 (62.4)	16.6 (61.9)	14.3 (57.7)	10.9 (51.6)	7.2 (45.0)	4.8 (40.6)	10.2 (50.4)
Mean daily minimum °C (°F)	1.7 (35.1)	1.6 (34.9)	3.0 (37.4)	4.7 (40.5)	7.5 (45.5)	10.4 (50.7)	12.4 (54.3)	12.3 (54.1)	10.2 (50.4)	7.6 (45.7)	4.4 (39.9)	2.1 (35.8)	6.5 (43.7)
Record low °C (°F)	−16.0 (3.2)	−11.3 (11.7)	−8.0 (17.6)	−4.8 (23.4)	−1.6 (29.1)	0.6 (33.1)	3.8 (38.8)	5.0 (41.0)	1.5 (34.7)	−3.6 (25.5)	−7.8 (18.0)	−14.0 (6.8)	−16.0 (3.2)
Average precipitation mm (inches)	76.7 (3.02)	56.0 (2.20)	51.9 (2.04)	52.7 (2.07)	57.8 (2.28)	54.9 (2.16)	60.2 (2.37)	65.6 (2.58)	55.1 (2.17)	79.5 (3.13)	82.0 (3.23)	78.6 (3.09)	770.8 (30.35)
Average precipitation days (≥ 1.0 mm)	13.0	10.9	9.9	10.1	9.8	9.3	9.7	10.2	9.7	12.4	13.4	13.3	131.7
Mean monthly sunshine hours	60.6	78.9	124.5	172.9	210.9	205.2	215.2	192.7	154.1	112.9	70.7	54.4	1,653
Source 1: Met Office
Source 2: Starlings Roost Weather

== Population ==
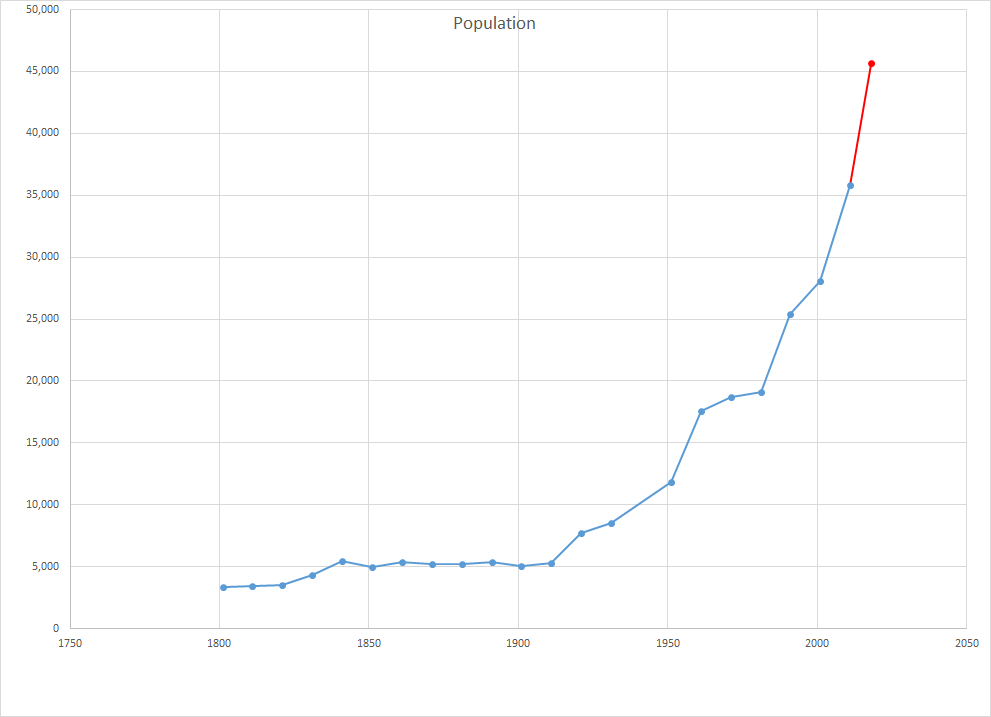
Population of Chippenham 1801–2018 (2011–2018 estimate in red)

The population of Chippenham civil parish recorded at the 2021 census was 36,548.

Chippenham's population grew rapidly in the 1990s, from 25,376 in 1991 to 28,065 at the 2001 census, an increase of 11%. This reflected the development of large housing estates (indeed, entirely new suburbs) such as Cepen Park to the west of the town, and the Pewsham development to the east (named for the small village of Pewsham, further east).

== Governance ==
Coat of arms of the Chippenham

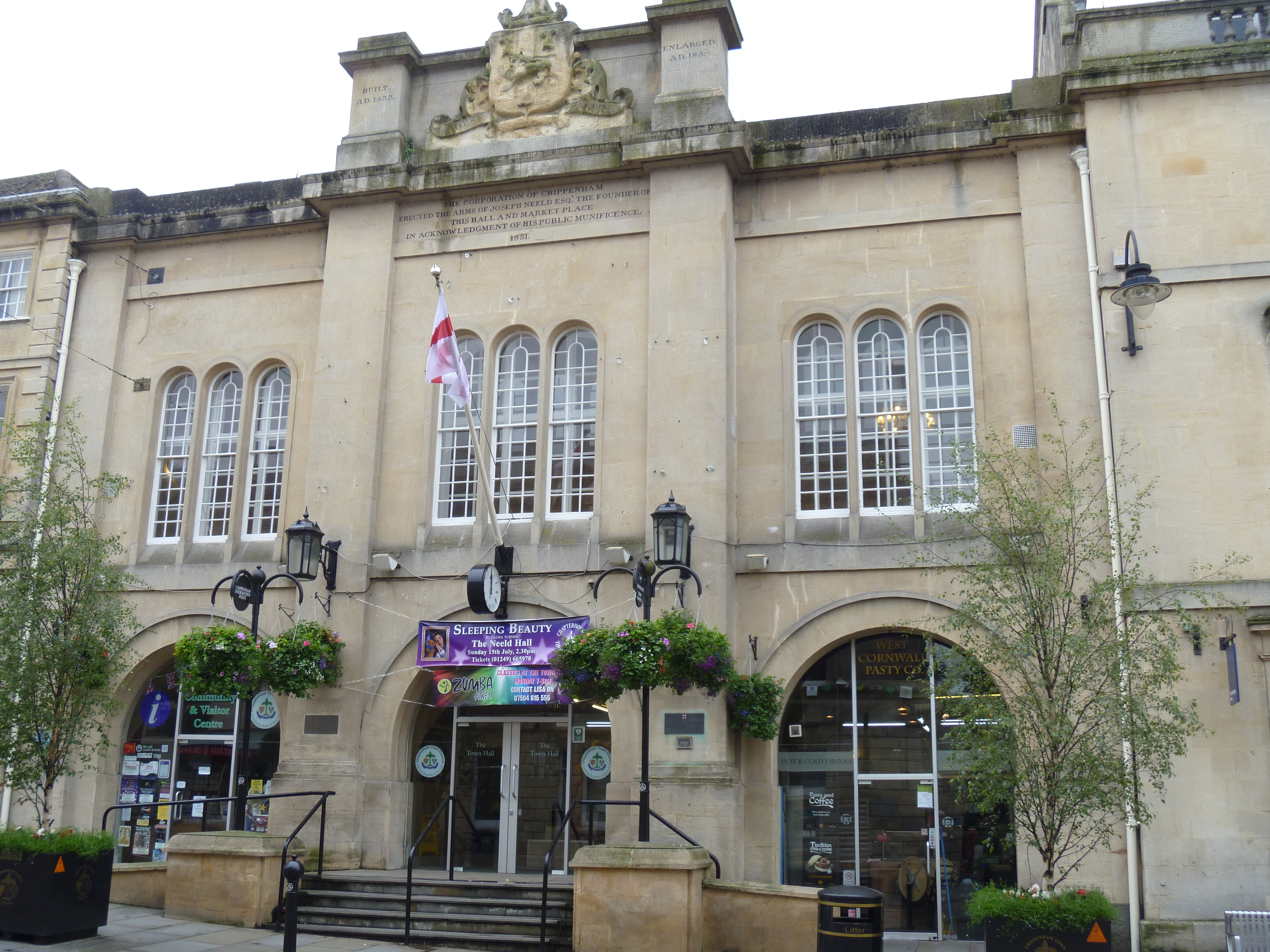
Chippenham Town Hall

The offices of North Wiltshire District Council were in the town until 2009, when a unitary authority was created for the whole of Wiltshire. The offices in Monkton Park were taken over by Wiltshire Council, which has its headquarters in Trowbridge.

The office of Town Mayor was established in 1835, before which Chippenham was governed by a bailiff supported by burgesses. Elected annually by the Town Council, the Mayor is generally appointed to office in May each year, at the "Mayor Making" ceremony. As part of their duties as the first citizen of a town, the Mayor visits organisations, charities and groups representing all parts of the local community, acting as a figurehead to promote goodwill, cultural exchange, trade and commerce. The Mayor also nominates a charity which they will support throughout their year of office. Other tasks include presiding over Town Council meetings and acting as president of various local organisations, such as the Twinning Association and the Sea Cadets.

In 1812, Sir Robert Peel, the creator of the modern police force, served as one of the two Members of Parliament (MPs) for Chippenham.

Until 2010, the town was within the parliamentary constituency of North Wiltshire, traditionally a Conservative stronghold, although in the 19th century some Liberal members were elected. Boundary changes for the 2010 general election saw Liberal Democrat candidate Duncan Hames become the Member of Parliament for Chippenham, a newly created constituency formed from parts of three neighbouring constituencies. In 2015, Chippenham was won for the Conservatives by Michelle Donelan, who held it until 2024 when Sarah Gibson of the Liberal Democrats won the seat, after further significant boundary changes.

Chippenham Town Council, which is based at Chippenham Town Hall, is responsible for some public services in the town. For 2020–21 they set the 13th highest council tax of any lowest tier (parish/town) council in England at £262.05 per Band D property, and proposed to increase this to £270.44 for 2021–22. Unlike most town and parish councils, the Town Council employs a Chief Executive rather than a Town Clerk.

== Economy ==
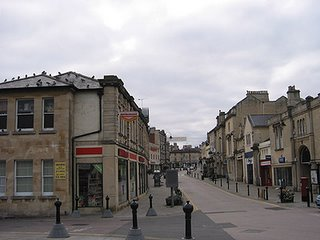
Chippenham High Street featured a co-operative department store (left foreground), now occupied by other retailers

Historically a market town, Chippenham's economy has since changed to that of a commuter town with residents travelling to workplaces in Bath, Bristol, Swindon and even London (almost 100 miles to the east).

Several large businesses have been located in the region, with the biggest former employer being Westinghouse, now owned by Siemens, whose factory complex lies next to the railway station. The company undertakes railway signalling contracts for Network Rail, London Underground as well as railway operators in other parts of the world, e.g. Beijing Subway, Oslo Public Transport Administration, SMRT Corporation, Kowloon-Canton Railway Corporation, MTR Corporation and many others. Parts of the Westinghouse site are occupied by a range of companies. There are a number of other industrial sites around the town, Bumpers Farm being the largest.

In 2005, Wincanton PLC, Europe's second-largest logistics organisation, consolidated its head office operations and moved to the newly developed Methuen Park office development in west Chippenham, where it employs around 350 people. In 2025, work began on a rail signalling facility on the outskirts of the town. Siemens are due to relocate once the building is completed.

=== Market ===
Chippenham is a market town, with street markets taking place every Friday and Saturday around Market Place and along the High Street. A Farmers' Market for the sale of fresh, locally produced foodstuffs is also held here once a fortnight. The original Cattle Market, which closed in 2004, is now being redeveloped by Linden Homes Western Limited as one of the UK's largest eco-housing projects.

=== Shopping ===
Chippenham's main retail area surrounds the High Street (which is closed to traffic during the day) and the Market Place. Two shopping centres lie on either side of the High Street: the enclosed Emery Gate Shopping Centre and the open-air Borough Parade. Emery Gate Shopping Centre opened in 1986. It takes over 90,000 square feet of land and has a 243 car space 2 level car park situated next to and below the building. Following a sale in 2022, the centre is now owned by Acorn Property Group. In 2008, Tesco moved into the centre following the closure of Somerfield, where it remained until its closure in 2024. In July 2026, it was announced the former Tesco building would be converted into a "modern indoor leisure destination".

In and around the High Street, there are very few independent shops as franchises dominate; there are some independent shops along The Causeway and in the Upper Market Place.

Retail parks, such as the Hathaway Retail Park, Bath Road Retail Park and the Chippenham Retail Park (Bumpers Way), are towards the edge of town and contain larger superstores and fast-food outlets.

The Chippenham Co-operative Society was founded in 1890. Over the years, it played an increasing role in the local economy, becoming deeply involved in agriculture and dairy farming, and for most of the 20th century its department store dominated the lower end of the High Street. However, by the 1960s, the business was facing increasing competition and found it necessary to join forces with other co-operatives, first locally, then nationally, forming The Co-operative Group. In the 1980s, this flagship store was sold and became a Wilko branch, but the Co-operative Group diversified into other areas, such as insurance and funeral services, which still operate through many local branches.

== Transport ==
=== Railway ===
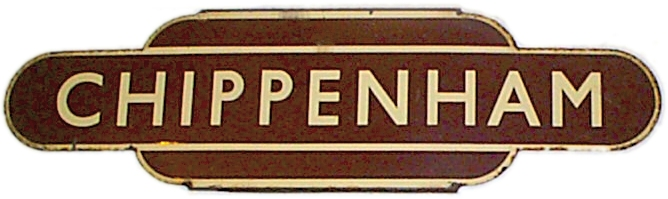
British Railways totem sign for Chippenham station

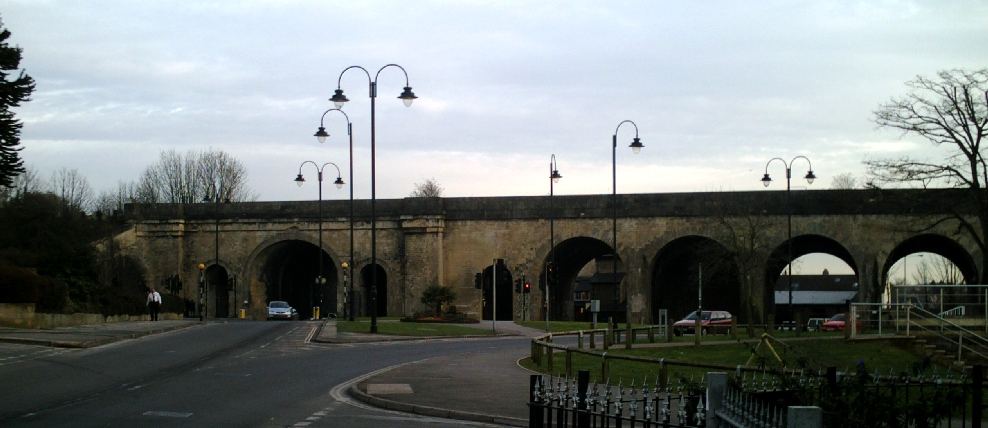
Brunel's railway viaduct

Chippenham railway station is a stop on the Great Western Main Line. Great Western Railway operates inter-city trains to London Paddington, Swindon, Bristol Temple Meads, Weston-super-Mare, Cardiff Central, Swansea, Plymouth and Penzance. It is also served by a route connecting Swindon with Westbury, via Melksham. The Chippenham and Calne line formerly connected the town to Calne but is now a cycle path.

The station is famous for its railway arches and other buildings engineered by Isambard Kingdom Brunel, as part of the historic Great Western Railway development.

=== Roads ===
Chippenham lies 4 miles (6.4 km) south of the M4 motorway, which links the town to Bristol, Swindon, South Wales and London. The A4 former coach road, A420 and B4069 provide further road links to Bath, Bristol and Oxford.

The town is bypassed to the west by the A350, which links the M4 motorway with Chippenham and nearby towns to the south, such as Melksham, Westbury, Frome, Warminster and Trowbridge before entering Dorset where it terminates in Poole. The A4 national route crosses the southern part of the town, linking Chippenham to nearby Corsham, Calne and Bath. In November 2019, the government approved an eastern extension linking the A4 to the A350 north of Cepen Park. A link road bypassing the new Birds Marsh area to the north-east of the town opened in 2022.

=== Buses ===
Chippenham's bus services are operated by Stagecoach West, Faresaver and Coachstyle. Key routes include the 55 to Swindon, 231 to Bath, X34 to Trowbridge and Frome, 33 to Devizes, 44K to Kington St Michael and 99 to Malmesbury and Swindon. National Express coach services call at Chippenham to destinations including Bath, Heathrow Airport and London.

== Tourism ==
Surrounding the town are a number of stone-built villages, including Lacock (National Trust), Biddestone, Bremhill, and Castle Combe. The great house and art treasures of Longleat, Bowood House, Lacock Abbey, Sheldon Manor and Corsham Court are within easy reach. Chippenham Museum and Heritage Centre is in the town centre and tells the story of the market town.

=== Twinned towns ===
Chippenham is twinned with La Flèche in France and Friedberg in Germany.

La Flèche is on the Loire, 42 km (26 mi) from Le Mans and 72 km (45 mi) from Tours. Its Prytanée national militaire school dates back to the time of King Henry IV of France.

Friedberg is a walled town 64 km (40 mi) from Munich and the Bavarian Alps, founded in 1264 by Ludwig the severe and his nephew. It holds many sporting and cultural events such as the 17th century Street Festival.

== Culture ==
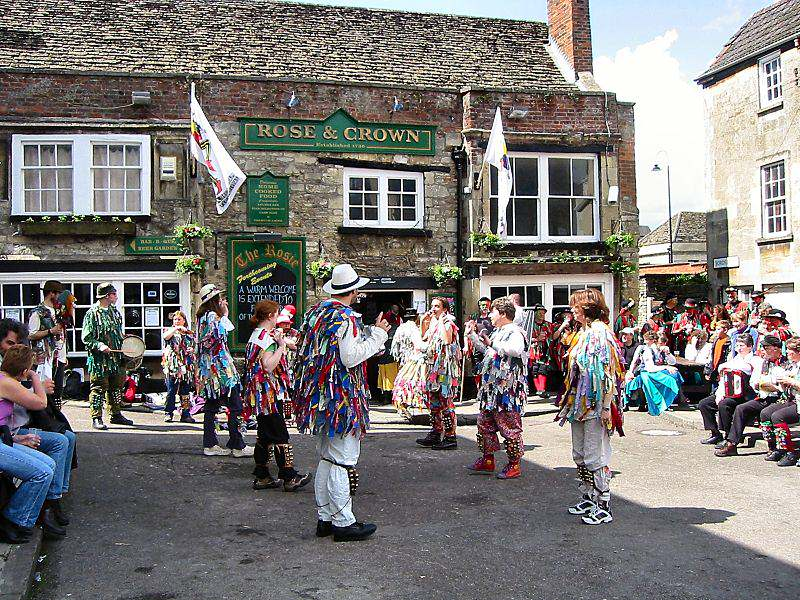
Chippenham Folk festival

The Chippenham Folk Festival takes place every year, usually over the Whitsuntide weekend.

There is an annual festival in remembrance of American rock and roll singer Eddie Cochran, who died on 17 April 1960 following a car accident in Chippenham on his way back to London during a tour.

From 1963, the Town Museum was housed in the Yelde Hall. By 2000, it had outgrown the site and moved to the former Magistrates' Court in the Market Place. The museum charts the history of the town from Neolithic times until today. By 2005, the museum had attracted over 90,000 visitors.

== Local media ==
Local news and television programmes are provided by BBC West and ITV West Country. Television signals are received from the Mendip TV transmitter.

Chippenham is served by these local radio stations: BBC Radio Wiltshire, Heart West, Greatest Hits Radio South West and Chippenham Hospital Radio which broadcast from the Chippenham Community Hospital in the town.

The local newspapers are the Gazette and Herald and Wiltshire Times.

== Sport and leisure ==
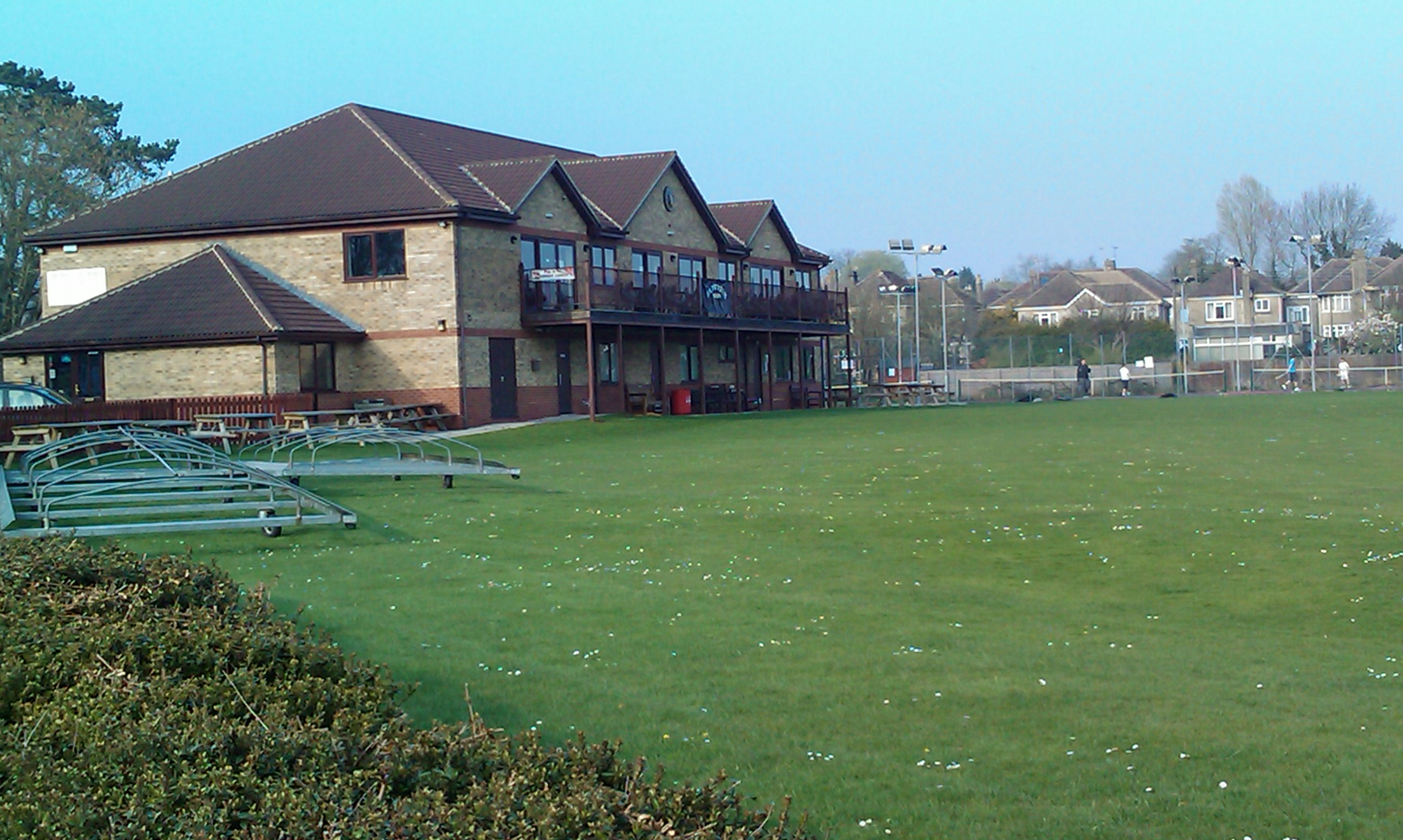
Chippenham Sports Club Pavilion

Chippenham is well served with sports clubs and leisure facilities. The Olympiad Leisure Centre opened in 1989, replacing an outdoor pool which had closed in 1988. It caters for a wide range of interests and has a variety of swimming pools and full gym facilities. It also hosts events including the popular annual CAMRA Beer Festival.

Chippenham Sports Club, on the A420 Bristol Road, is a members' sports club. Its facilities include a two-storey pavilion that overlooks the six hard-surface floodlit tennis courts and the cricket square and field. The all-weather hockey pitches are used by ladies' and men's teams. The Dome, an inflatable, all year round, indoor sports dome, provides amenities including netball, cricket nets and a five-a-side football league. Chippenham Town Bowls Club, with its own pavilion, is on the same site.

The town is home to Chippenham Town F.C. They were formed in 1873, and most notably played in the FA Vase 2000 final, when they lost 1–0 to Deal Town F.C. They currently play in the National League South. Chippenham United F.C., formed in 1905, played for twelve seasons in the Wiltshire Football League after World War II, but folded in 1962.

Chippenham Rugby Club is on the western outskirts alongside the A350 bypass and is accessed from the Bristol Road at Allington Farm Shop. This members' club has an all-weather rugby pitch and two full size grass rugby pitches, all with floodlights. In addition there are grass areas for mini rugby, all-weather cricket nets and a cricket ground used by Allington Cricket Club who have two teams.

Chippenham Golf Club, formed in 1896, is on the A350 as it leads north from the town towards the M4.

Chippenham has a small cinema, the Reel Astoria, on the A420 Marshfield Road, to the west of the town centre.

The Sustrans National Cycle Network Route 403 passes through the town.

== Education ==
=== 17th and 18th centuries ===
In his will of 1661, Richard Scott directed that his house in Cooke's Street should be used as a school, and William Woodruffe gave an annuity of £5 in 1664 for the teaching of ten poor boys. In 1713 the school was reopened with a benefaction of £10 per annum for 24 boys.

=== Late 19th century ===
From 1875 a private venture grammar school existed in Chippenham, conducted in St Mary Street by Mr Wilson and from 1883 by Mr Cruikshank.

In 1891, the Technical Instruction Act 1889 (52 & 53 Vict. c. 76) and the Technical Instruction Act 1891 (54 & 55 Vict. c. 4) provided financial assistance for evening classes in various science and arts subjects. Earlier voluntary classes were now coordinated, and this became the beginning of a national system of technical education. Subjects included Shorthand, Animal Physiology, Chemistry, Physics, Hygiene, Carpentry and Dressmaking.

In 1893, Edward Newall Tuck was appointed by the Education Committee of the Borough of Chippenham to organise technical classes in Chippenham and district. Classes were held in rented premises at No. 21 London Road and at the Jubilee Institute, as well as in villages including Grittleton and Yatton Keynell. Teachers from elementary schools attended classes in a School of Art on Saturdays at the Jubilee Institute. Mr Tuck, in addition, gave talks on Wiltshire history and nature study; he also served as town councillor and was Mayor of Chippenham from 1931 to 1932. In 1894, pupils were not admitted to classes until they reached the age of 11. Pupils from day schools were admitted free from age 11 to 16. The fees at this time were fixed at 6d per month, the whole expenses of the school being met by fees and grants from the Science and Art Department and the County Council. Higher grade classes for boys, including Woodwork and Chemistry, were held at No. 21 London Road.

In 1896, under the provisions of the Technical and Industrial Institutions Act 1892 (55 & 56 Vict. c. 29), the Borough of Chippenham established the Chippenham and District County School, subsequently known as the Chippenham County Secondary School for Boys and Girls, with Mr Tuck as the first headmaster (he remained in this post until 1939). The first Chair of Governors was former mayor Alderman John Coles.

The premises were still located at No. 21 London Road and the Jubilee Institute. As the tenancy of the private venture school was to end on 25 March 1896, the Town Council paid Mr Cruikshank £10 for the desks, books and goodwill of his school. Boys were drawn from three elementary schools in Chippenham: the British, National and St. Paul's Schools. In addition twelve boys had previously attended the private grammar school. Others were from other private schools in Chippenham, Corsham, Devizes, Calne and surrounding villages. There were 39 boys aged 11 to 16 on the admission register from 13 April 1896. The curriculum included Latin, French, science, history, geography, grammar, bookkeeping, shorthand, arithmetic, writing, geometry and freehand drawing.

In September 1898, a girls' school was established, against some opposition, in the Temperance Hall, Foghamshire; 22 girls were admitted at opening, from the schools of Mrs Parry (Market Place), Miss Alexander (Monkton Hill), Mrs White (Marshfield Road), from private tuition and from local National and British schools.

=== 20th century ===
On 24 September 1900, the Chippenham District County School opened in Cocklebury Lane, now part of Wiltshire College (built on an acre of land purchased in 1896 by the county, Urban and Rural District Councils). The ceremony was attended by the Mayor and Aldermen of Chippenham. In addition to Mr Edward Newall Tuck as headmaster, the staff included three masters and one mistress; there were 99 pupils. The total cost of the project was £6,000. In addition to the buildings and playground, four acres of adjoining land were rented for playing fields. All day classes were consolidated here and pupil numbers increased rapidly.

On 1 May 1901 the Governors decided that the school should become a Science School. Four scholarships were granted (to three girls and one boy). In July it was decided to establish a centre for pupil-teachers at the school. In 1902, local education authorities were established and Wiltshire County Council became responsible for education in Chippenham. Latin was omitted from the curriculum. By 1904 there were 101 pupils: 50 from urban and 51 from rural areas. In addition 49 pupil teachers were attending, 9 from urban and the remainder from rural schools, and the evening classes had 139 pupils. From 1905 girls from elementary schools attended Cookery classes at the Cocklebury Road site.

By October 1907 the school had 128 pupils: 64 boys and 64 girls. The age of admission was 9, and the leaving age 17 to 18. In addition to the yearly fees paid by pupils, the school was financed by County and Government grants. In 1908 the fees were five guineas a year, including books. However, there were a number of scholarships available and figures for the year show that of 115 pupils (66 girls and 49 boys), 57 held scholarships, one a "free place", and only 57 were fee-payers.

In 1922, the school received further County and Government grants. In the inter-war years, numbers of pupils on roll increased steadily, and by 1929 there were 262. The Junior department was reorganised as a Kindergarten and Preparatory Form, catering for 61 children aged 8 to 10. However, the number of pupils over the age of 16 was proportionally small in comparison with the average for Wiltshire Grammar Schools, and so there was no separate sixth form, although a few pupils did go on to university, some with the aid of County Scholarships.

By the early 1930s the buildings were overcrowded, and by 1935 pupil numbers had reached 288. Wiltshire County Council purchased Hardenhuish Park from the Clutterbuck family to satisfy the educational requirements of the growing town. In 1938, the Secondary Grammar School moved from Cocklebury Road to new buildings (since demolished) on the east side of Hardenhuish House. The old Manor House became the headmaster's room, the school library and some classrooms. The new school extended over 40 acres (16 hectares) of Hardenhuish Park; new buildings contained a hall, gymnasium, laboratories, classrooms, and cloakrooms. In 1939, the Preparatory department closed.

By 1940 there were 414 pupils, of whom 25 were evacuees. 10% were under the age of 11 and, still, only 2% over 16. The Cocklebury Road premises became Chippenham County Secondary Modern School, a senior mixed school taking children aged 11 and over from the primary schools of Chippenham and district.

=== Present day ===
The nearest third-level institution is the University of Bath campus at Claverton Down, 12 miles to the west of Chippenham.

Wiltshire College & University Centre, the successor to Chippenham Technical College, has a campus (built in 2015) on Cocklebury Road.

Three secondary schools cater for students from age 11 through sixth form:

- Hardenhuish School and Sheldon School are on adjacent sites in the north-west of Chippenham.
- Abbeyfield School is on the south-east edge of the town.

Silverwood School, Wiltshire Council's special school for ages 4–19, has a campus (formerly St Nicholas School) on Malmesbury Road, Chippenham.

== Religion ==
In the 2001 census, 73.2% of the population in Chippenham parish defined themselves as Christian, 17.3% said they were of no religion and 8% did not state a religion.

In the 2011 census, 59.6% of the population in the parish defined themselves as Christian, 31.1% said they were of no religion and 7.3% did not state a religion.

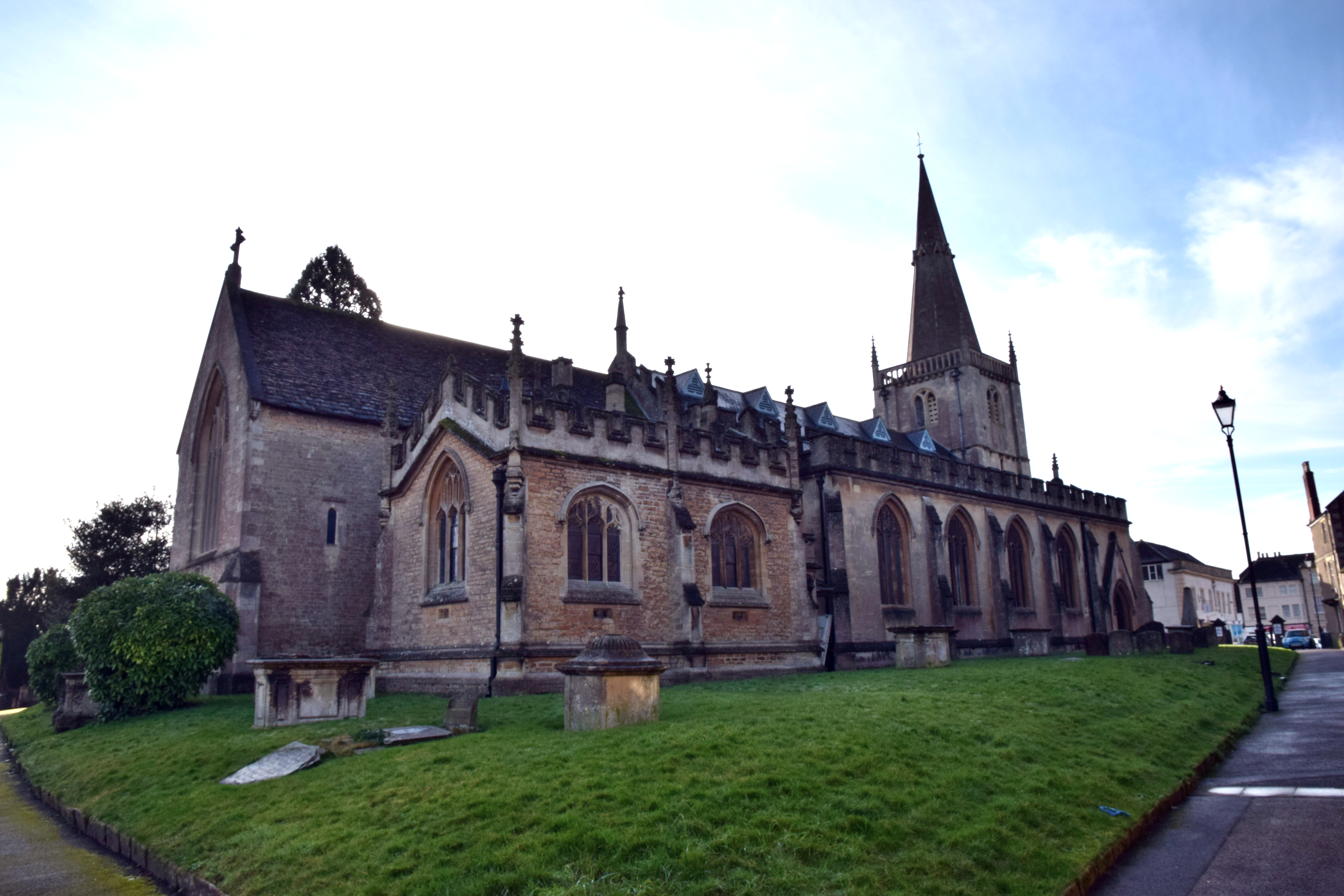
St Andrew's Church

=== Church of England ===
- St Andrew's parish church is believed to have been built on the site of an Anglo-Saxon church. Many features of the present church are Norman (with the chancel arch being completed in c.1120). The spire was completed in 1633 although the 8 bells currently present were not added until 1734, and the back-lit clock and chimes in 1858. The organ has a case front dating from the 18th century. The church registers date from 1578. There was a Victorian era restoration of the interior of the church in 1875–1878 and again in the 1990s.
- St. Nicholas church was built in 1779 and replaced an older medieval church that had previously stood on the same Hardenhuish site. The church was designed by John Wood, the Younger of Bath. The church registers date from 1730.
- St. Paul's church was built in 1854–55 by Sir George Gilbert Scott, was consecrated on 18 April 1855 and has registers dating from that time.
- St. Peter's original build started in 1885 and opened on 19 November 1886 as a stone and red brick building. The church was replaced by the current church in 1968. The newer St Peter's is a modern six-sided design, originally with a copper roof (now tiled), a fibreglass spire and no internal supports.

=== Roman Catholic ===
- Saint Mary's Roman Catholic Church, originally built in Saint Mary's Place in 1855. The new church was built in 1935 on Station Hill, replacing the original on 29 February 1936.

=== Non-Conformist ===
- Central Methodist church was built in 1909 to mark the centenary of Methodism in Chippenham. It was originally called Monkton Hill Methodist Church but was renamed after it joined parishes with that of Primitive Methodist Chapel, The Causeway which closed in the late 1980s.
- Christian Fellowship – Elim Pentecostal Church
- Emmanuel Evangelical Church was founded in April 2005, and meets at its building on Goldney Avenue on Sundays. It is affiliated to the Fellowship of Independent Evangelical Churches.
- Ladyfield Evangelical Church is also affiliated to the Fellowship of Independent Evangelical Churches.
- Oasis Church was founded April 2004 by Pastors Ralph and Heather Burden of the Assemblies of God. It focuses on younger worshippers, meeting on Saturday evenings and featuring rock music.
- The Old Baptist Chapel opened on 10 June 1804 but was not registered until 1810. The internal baptistry was added in 1818.
- The Salvation Army Citadel was originally opened in 1903 in Bath Road but the building was later sold to Pictons, after which the Salvation Army moved into the Co-op hall in Foghamshire. November 2012 saw the building reopen as The Citadel Hall.
- Sheldon Road Methodist Church was built in 1901.
- Station Hill Baptist Chapel was built in 1855.
- Tabernacle United Reformed Church was built in 1770, replaced in 1826, and refitted in 1889. The church had substantial internal renovations in the 1990s.

=== Closed churches ===
- Cepen Park Methodist Church held services in two local schools and closed in 2005.
- Primitive Methodist Chapel, The Causeway opened in 1896, replacing an older chapel believed to have been built around 1835 on the same site, which was retained as a schoolroom at the rear of the newer building. The chapel closed in the late 1980s although the buildings remain.
- Christian Science Society Church, Lowden Avenue. The building is now used by a children's nursery.

== Notable people ==
- Arthur Rostron, captain of the Carpathia, who rescued Titanic survivors
- Dominic West, actor, director and musician
- Daniel Bethell, Paralympic medalist in badminton, attended Sheldon school.
- Gabrielle Aplin, singer-songwriter, attended Sheldon School
- David Bishop, track athlete, attended Hardenhuish School
- Rowland Brotherhood, 19th-century railway engineer
- Major General Walter Clutterbuck, British Army officer who commanded the 1st Infantry Division during World War II
- Jeremy Corbyn, former Labour Party leader, brought up nearby at Kington St Michael
- Piers Corbyn, weather forecaster (brother of Jeremy), brought up nearby at Kington St Michael
- Jamie Cullum, jazz musician, attended Sheldon School
- Tom Dunn, hooker for Bath
- Darren Eadie, Norwich City player
- Sir Cyril Fox, archaeologist, director of the National Museum of Wales
- Cyd Hayman, actress
- Christopher Hinton, nuclear engineer, attended Hardenhuish School
- Robin Hobbs, England test cricketer, Wiltshire's most capped test cricketer
- Wil Hodgson, comedian, winner Perrier Best Newcomer 2004
- Chris Horsman, former Welsh international rugby union prop forward who moved to coaching, attended Sheldon School
- Danny Kent, Moto3 motorcyclist
- Francis Kilvert, diarist, born in Hardenhuish and lived in nearby Langley Burrell
- Yan Klukowski, footballer who played for Chippenham Town, Forest Green Rovers and Newport County, attended Sheldon School
- Gary Leitzell, ex-mayor of Dayton, Ohio, attended Hardenhuish School
- Adrian Maben, (1942–2025) film and television director, writer, and producer
- Tyrone Mings, footballer who plays for Aston Villa, attended Sheldon School
- Sol Pryce, footballer for Swindon Town, attended Sheldon School
- Robert Peel, Prime Minister and police reformer, was MP for a short time
- David Simeon, television and theatre actor
- Henry Fox Talbot, inventor and pioneer of photography, served as MP
- Heather Tanner (née Spackman), writer and campaigner, wife of Robin Tanner, attended Hardenhuish School
- Robin Tanner, artist, etcher and printmaker, husband of Heather Tanner, attended Hardenhuish School
- David Turner, played cricket for Hampshire 1966–1989
- Sir Peter Wanless, chief executive at the NSPCC 2013–2024, chief executive at the Big Lottery Fund 2008–2013, former Director of School Performance and Reform for the Department for Education and Skills, attended Sheldon School
- Victoria Wicks, radio, television and theatre actress
- Richard Wodehouse, cricketer, one of three brothers of author P. G. Wodehouse

== Freedom of the Town ==
The following military units have received the Freedom of the Town of Chippenham.

- RAF Rudloe Manor: 1992.
- Duke of Edinburgh's Royal Regiment: 1994.
- 9 Regiment, Royal Logistic Corps: 19 January 2012.
- 1st Battalion The Rifles: 19 January 2012.

== See also ==
- Chippenham Without
- Goldney baronets
- Neeld baronets
