= Jury (disambiguation) =

A jury is a body of persons convened to render a verdict in a legal situation.

Jury or juried may also refer to:

== People ==
- Al Jury (1941–2024), American football official
- Bob Jury (born 1955), American football player
- Chris Jury (born 1956), English actor, director and writer
- Eliahu I. Jury (1923–2020), Iraqi-born American engineer
- Ernie Jury, New Zealand lawn bowler
- Fuad Jorge Jury (1938–2012), Argentine singer, actor and filmmaker who went by the stage name Leonardo Favio
- Hugo Jury (1887–1945), Austrian Nazi
- Yury (also spelt Jury and other variants), the Slavic form of the masculine given name George

== Places ==
- Jury, Moselle, France

== Other uses ==
- Jury (TV series), a 1974 Canadian reality television miniseries
- Juried competition, a juried competition, usually of literary or artistic works, including films
- Jury rig, makeshift repairs with the tools on hand
- Jury tampering, illegally influencing the jury
- "Jury" (Not Going Out), a 2022 television episode

== See also ==
- Jurat
- The Jury (disambiguation)
