= Sheldon Manor =

Historic manor house in Wiltshire, England

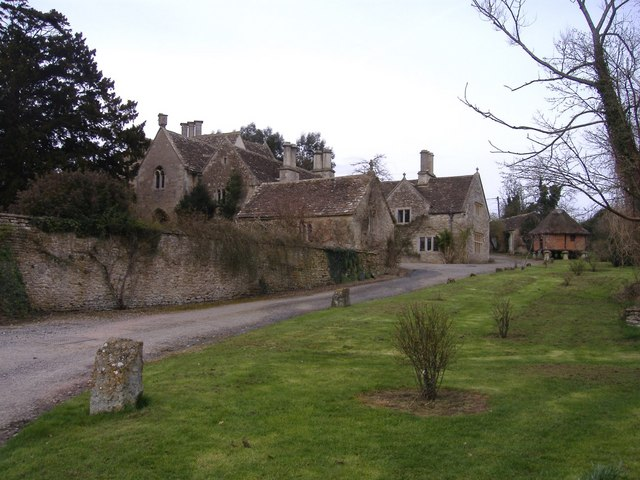

- Location within Wiltshire
- 51.4660°N 2.1651°W
- Type: Manor House
- Location: Wiltshire

Listed Building – Grade I
- Official name: Sheldon Manor
- Designated: 20 December 1960
- Reference no.: 1022907

Listed Building – Grade II*
- Official name: Chapel to the south-east of Sheldon Manor
- Designated: 20 December 1960
- Reference no.: 1022908

Sheldon Manor near Chippenham, Wiltshire, England, is Wiltshire's oldest inhabited manor house and dates back to Anglo-Saxon times. Its structure is mostly 17th-century, and it is a Grade I listed building.

== History ==
The medieval settlement of Sheldon, first mentioned in 803, no longer exists, having been deserted by 1582; a 1976 survey confirmed its remains to lie to the rear of the Manor, which itself stands on the site of an older habitation known as "The Holloway".

The manor of Sheldon was granted to Sir William de Beauvilain in about 1180; on his death, as a Norman, it was forfeit to the Crown as an escheat and then granted to the de Godarville family in 1231 by Henry III. In 1250 it passed to Sir Geoffrey Gascelyn on his marriage to Joan de Godarville. In 1424 the manor was sold to Sir Walter Hungerford, and after some time was eventually granted to Catherine Parr temporarily until the Hungerford heir achieved majority.

For many years, the property was tenanted until Sir Edward Hungerford sold the manor in 1684 and in 1711 it was bought by William Norris, whose last survivor died in 1828. In 1854 it was bought by Sir Gabriel Goldney, whose son lived there until 1911, followed by the Bailey family.

From 1917 the manor was owned by the Gibbs family being Major Martin Anthony Gibbs, a former High Sheriff of Wiltshire, his wife Elsie Margaret Mary (née Hamilton-Dalrymple) and their six children.

In 1982, Mrs Gibbs published a historical and architectural account of the manor.

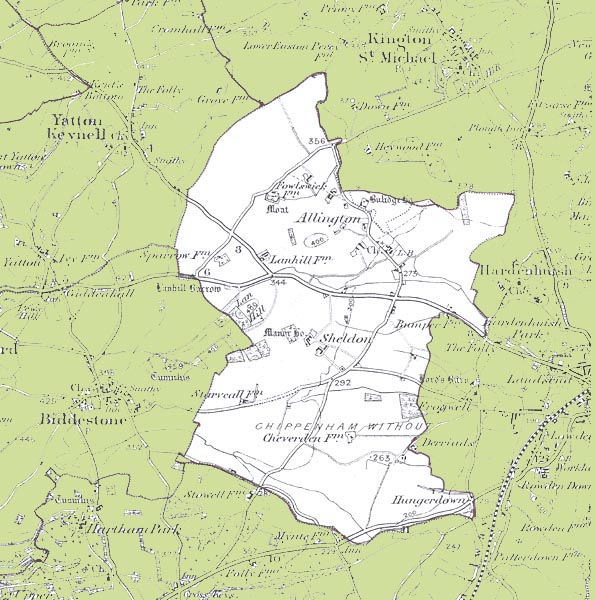
1896 Ordnance Survey map of Chippenham Without

The house is now within the civil parish of Chippenham Without; unbroken occupation since 1282 makes Sheldon Manor Wiltshire's longest continuously inhabited manor house. It was designated as a Grade I listed building by the Historic Building and Monuments Commission for England in 1960.

== Architecture and antiques ==
The earliest parts of the structure are thought to be a window on the west side and the porch, dating back to the late 13th century. Pevsner considered the porch to be "astounding, but much too big for the present house". Most of the main structure, consisting of two and a half storeys, and of rubble stone and stone-tiled roofs, dates to c. 1659 when it was built for a Mr Forster, although some parts are earlier. Later additions date to post-1711 and improvements to c. 1911.

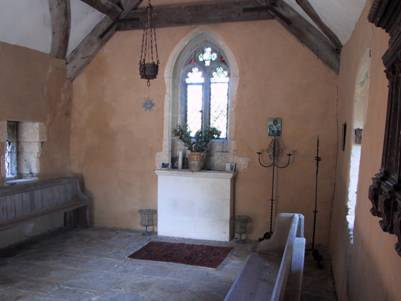
Interior of chapel

=== External features ===
There is a small stone chapel in the grounds, believed to date to about 1450 and built by the Hungerford family for use by themselves and their servants. It has an east window with Perpendicular tracery. After a long period of use as stables, it was restored in the twentieth century. There is also a brick-built storehouse mounted on staddle stones to prevent incursion by rats.

=== Antiques ===
The Manor has collections of Nailsea glass, Persian saddlebags, porcelain and oak furniture, including an Elizabethan refectory table and chairs. There are paintings by Tissot, David Teniers and Bassano, vases by William De Morgan and "an unusual collection of glass walking sticks."

== Modern times ==
The Manor was the first winner of AA/NPI Historic House Awards, for its "architectural integrity and warm welcome"; its gardens, which are open to the public although the house itself is not, include a notable rose garden, ancient yews, an arboretum and mulberry bushes.

The owners of the house were described in 1988 by The New York Times as "... provid[ing] that essential ingredient so many historic buildings lack: a sense of continuity with the past and the feeling that Sheldon Manor is still a living organism, not an ancient relic."

In 1995, the house was the location for Uppercross in the BBC production Persuasion and in 2008 for BBC One's Bonekickers.

In the 1980s, during the summer the "Shakespeare at Sheldon" festival was held under the supervision of the resident Gibbs family. The stage area was above the swimming pool, the tennis courts had marquees installed and were used as dressing areas and temporary raked seating was installed below the swimming pool for the audience. The thick hedge around this area enabled the actors to cross unseen after they exited the stage area.
