= Chippenham Town Hall =

Municipal building in Chippenham, Wiltshire, England

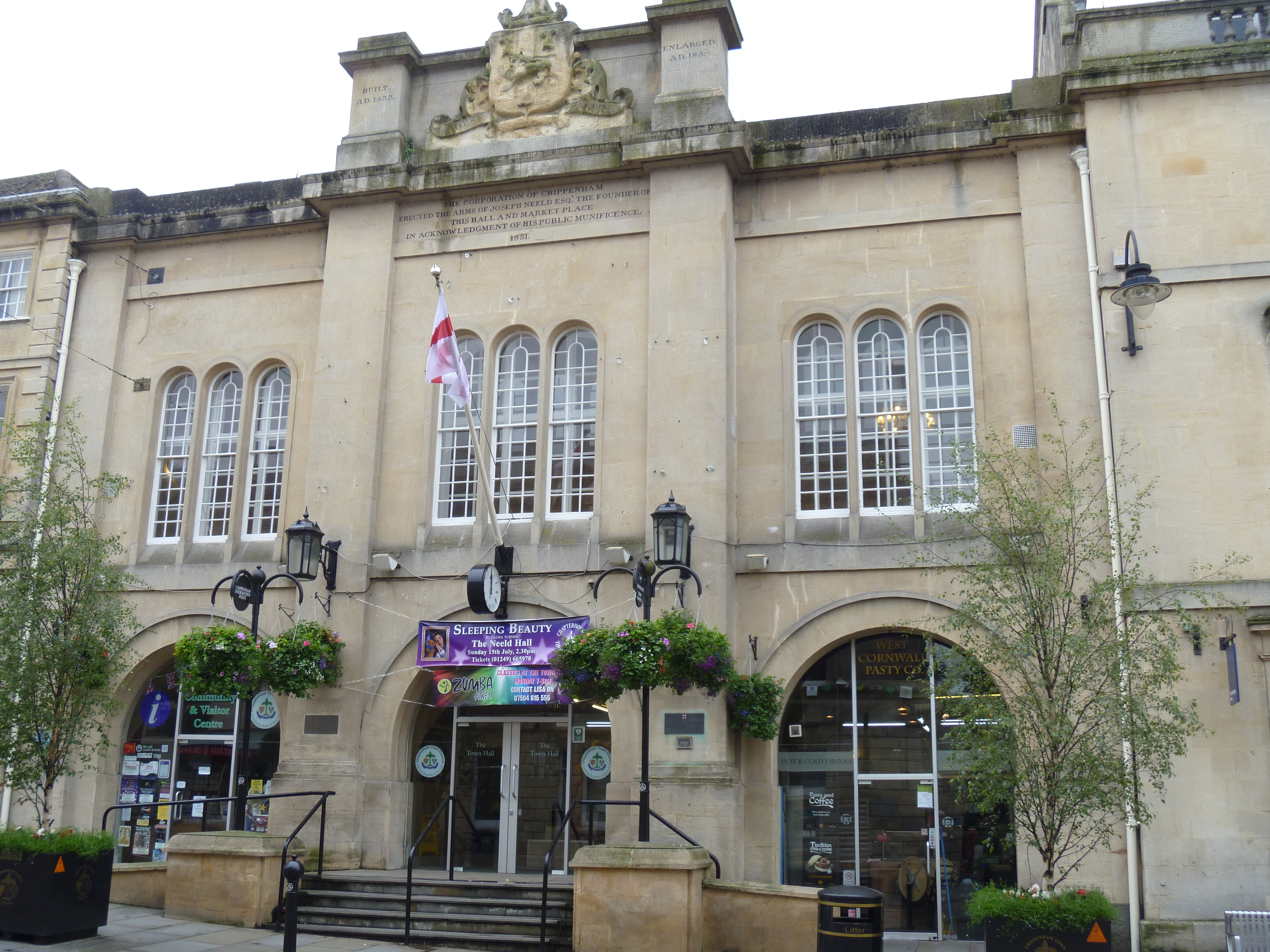
- Chippenham Town Hall

- Shown in Wiltshire
- 51.4586°N 2.1161°W
- Location: High Street, Chippenham

History
- Built: 1834

Site notes
- Architect: James Thomson
- Architectural style: Neoclassical style

Listed Building – Grade II
- Official name: New Town Hall and Neeld Hall
- Designated: 25 April 1950
- Reference no.: 1268113

Chippenham Town Hall is a 19th-century municipal building in the High Street, Chippenham, Wiltshire, England. The town hall, which was the headquarters of Chippenham Borough Council, is a Grade II listed building.

== History ==
After significant population growth, largely associated with the cloth trade, Chippenham became a municipal borough in 1835. In this context, civic leaders decided to accept the offer of the local member of parliament, Joseph Neeld, who had recently bought the nearby Grittleton House estate, to pay for a new town hall to replace the ageing Yelde Hall in the Market Place. The site they selected had been occupied by a public house, The Cannon Inn.

The new building was designed by James Thomson in the neoclassical style, built in ashlar stone at a cost of £12,000 and completed in 1834. The design involved an asymmetrical main frontage with four bays facing onto the High Street with the right hand bay projected forward; the left hand section featured a loggia of three bays each with openings on the ground floor flanked by full-height plain pilasters; there were three-light mullioned windows in each of the bays on the first floor and, above that, a panel bearing the inscription "The Corporation of Chippenham erected the Arms of Joseph Neeld Esq, the founder of this Hall and Market Place in acknowledgement of his private munificence 1851". Above the panel was a cornice and a parapet bearing the coat of arms of Joseph Neeld. Internally, the principal rooms were the market hall, on the ground floor, and the council chamber, on the first floor.

The town hall was extended to the rear between 1848 and 1850 to create a large cheese hall which later became known as the "Neeld Hall". The building was converted into an auxiliary war hospital for wounded soldiers operated by the local Voluntary Aid Detachment during the First World War. In the 1960s, the Neeld Hall was regularly used as an events venue: performers hosting concerts there included the rock band, The Kinks in September 1964 and the rock band The Who in May 1965.

The building continued to serve as the headquarters of Chippenham Borough Council for much of the 20th century but ceased to be the local seat of government when the enlarged North Wiltshire District Council was formed in 1974. Following completion of a major programme of refurbishment works in 1999, the Chippenham Town Council moved their own offices into the building. Additional improvements were made to the air conditioning, lighting and acoustics in the Neeld Hall in 2015 to enable it to function as a community and arts centre.
