= Faresaver =

Bus operator in Wiltshire, England

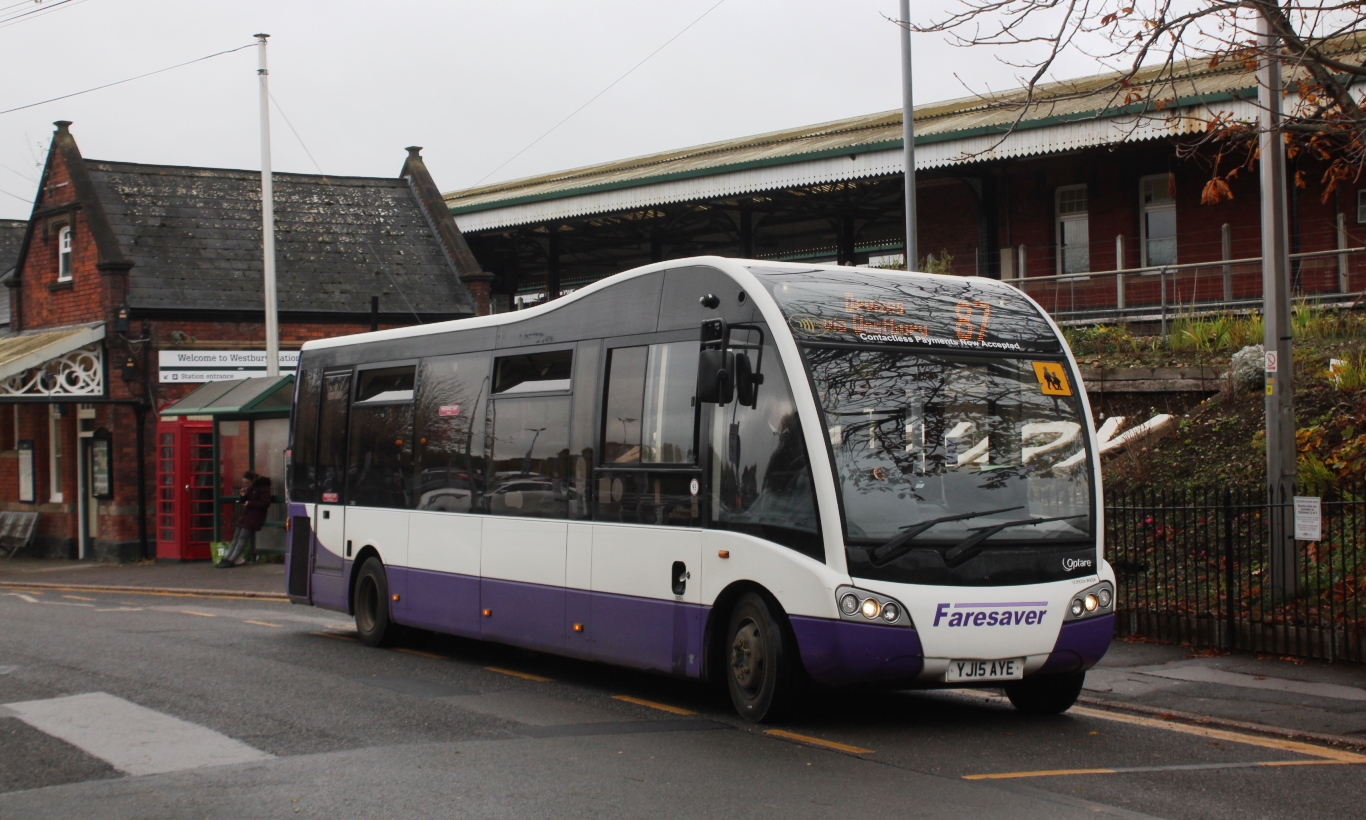
A Faresaver bus outside Westbury railway station, 2021

Faresaver is a bus operator based in Chippenham, Wiltshire, England.

== History ==
The company can trace it roots back to 1979 when John Pickford started Fosseway Coaches and initially ran one minibus on a school contract. Its first commercial route was introduced in Corsham in 1986. As the company grew, it moved into a purpose-built bus depot in 1997. As of 2023, the firm had around 60 vehicles.

== Routes ==
Faresaver operates route X31 between Chippenham and Bath via Corsham and Box. Prior to 2020, Faresaver operated the route from Monday to Saturday while First Bus operated the route on Sundays. When First announced in October 2019 that it would withdraw the Sunday service, Faresaver took over operation on Sundays.
