= Elizabeth Counsell =

English actress (born 1942)

- Born: 7 June 1942 (age 84); Windsor, Berkshire, England, United Kingdom
- Occupation: Actress
- Years active: 1962–present
- Spouse: David Simeon (m. 1978)
- Children: 1
- Parent(s): John Counsell, Mary Kerridge

Elizabeth Counsell (born 7 June 1942) is an English actress and singer, known for her role in the BBC television series Brush Strokes, as well as for her theatre work.

== Career ==
She began her career at the Theatre Royal, Windsor in 1957. Among her stage roles, she played Lady Macbeth to Michael Gambon's Macbeth at the Forum Theatre, Billingham in 1968, subsequently playing Michael Redgrave's leading lady in his 1976-77 anthology Shakespeare's People. In 1983 she played the title role in Peter Hall's production of Jean Seberg at the Royal National Theatre.

Her film appearances include Hot Millions (1968), Anne of the Thousand Days (1969), Under the Doctor (1976), Killer's Moon (1978) and Claudia (1985). She also featured in the 1983 Channel 4 comedy drama Hollywood Hits Chiswick, alongside Derek Newark as W.C. Fields. Her most recent film appearances include the 2012 film Song for Marion, with Vanessa Redgrave, and the 2014 film Grace of Monaco, starring Nicole Kidman. She later appeared in the second series of the BBC1 drama The Split (2020).

In December 2023, it was announced that Counsell had been cast as Gloria Knight in EastEnders.

== Personal life ==
Counsell is the daughter of actress Mary Kerridge and actor-director John Counsell, who together ran the Theatre Royal, Windsor. Her twin sister was the actress Jenny (Jennifer M) Counsell, who died on 23 May 2020. In 1978, Elizabeth married the actor David Simeon; the couple have a son, born in 1979.

== Filmography ==
=== Film ===
Year	Title	Role	Notes
1963	The Mind Benders	Girl Student at Station	Uncredited
1963	From Russia with Love	Woman in a Punt	Uncredited
1965	The Intelligence Men	Girl in Cucaracha	
1967	Carry On Follow That Camel	Harem Girl	Uncredited
1968	Hot Millions	Miss Glyn	Uncredited
1969	Anne of the Thousand Days	Anne's Lady-in-Waiting	
1976	Under the Doctor	Nurse Addison	
1978	Killer's Moon	Miss Lilac	
1985	Claudia	Audrey	
2002	The Great Sarah: A Portrait of Sarah Siddons	Sarah Siddons	
2012	Song for Marion	Cheryl	
2014	Grace of Monaco	Princess Ghislaine Dommanget	
2018	The Little Stranger	Miss Rossiter	
2018	Intrigo: Death of an Author	Frau Bloeme	
2018	The Double	Dr. Rutenspitz	
2019	Intrigo: Dear Agnes	Frau Bloeme	
2021	Bull	Marge	
2022	The Invitation	Mina Harker	
2023	Forever Young	Janice	

== Television ==
Year	Title	Role	Notes
1962	Call Oxbridge 2000	Thora	Episode: #2.7
1963	The Plane Makers	Jean Phillips	Episode: "A Matter of Self Respect"
1964	First Night	Ingrid	Episode: "Hunt the Man"
1965	Gideon's Way	Veronica Kendal	Episode: "The Alibi Man"
1965	Six of the Best	Irma	Episode: "Porterhouse: Private Eye"
1966	The Idiot	Adeline	All 5 episodes
1966	Emergency-Ward 10	Nora Penhurst	3 episodes
1967	Z-Cars	Ruth Grant	2 episodes
1967	Les Misérables	Eponine	4 episodes
1970	Hark at Barker	Heroine	Episode: "Rustless on Music"
1971	Jason King	Anna Brenskaja	Episode: " To Russia with... Panache"
1972	The Two Ronnies	Party Guest	Episode: #2.8
1972	The Reg Varney Revue	Various	5 episodes
1973	Crown Court	Rita Davey	' Crime in Prison ', episode: 2 episodes
1973	Nobody Is Norman Wisdom Anya	Episode: #1.6	
1973	The Adventures of Black Beauty	Elizabeth	Episode: "The Outcast"
1974	Doctor at Sea	Nurse Joyce Wynton	8 episodes
1974	The Top Secret Life of Edgar Briggs	Cathy	10 episodes
1976	Bless This House	Miss Plummer	Episode: "Well, Well, Well..."
1976–1978	The Many Wives of Patrick	Helen Woodford	12 episodes
1976	The Dick Emery Show	Various	Episode: #15.4
1976	Beasts	Mrs. Gibson	Episode: "During Barty's Party"
1977	The Sunday Drama	Doreen	Episode: "A Good Human Story"
1979	Take My Wife...	Various	Episode: #1.3
1981	Partners	Pamela Heslop	All 6 episodes
1981	Present Laughter	Joanna Lyppiatt	TV film
1982	The Gentle Touch	Marcia Bancroft	Episode: "Black Fox, White Vixen"
1982	Fame Is the Spur	Lady Lettice	4 episodes
1983	Tears Before Bedtime	Lady Lavenham	Episode: "Jobs for the Boys"
1983	Jemima Shore Investigates	Diana Boyle	Episode: "A Model Murder"
1985	The Moving Finger	Angela Symmington	Both 2 episodes
1985	C.A.T.S. Eyes	Bella Lewis	Episode: "Goodbye Jenny Wren"
1986	If Tomorrow Comes	Blanche Deauville	Episode: #1.2
1986–1991	Brush Strokes	Veronica Bainbridge	37 episodes
1986–1988	Executive Stress	Anthea Duxbury	17 episodes
1986	Lytton's Diary	Fanny	Episode: "The Ends and the Means"
1988	The Woman He Loved	Katherine Rogers	TV film
1988	Boon	Denise Appleby	Episode: "Honourable Service"
1992	Bunch of Five	Ivy	Episode: "Blue Heaven"
1994–1995	Nelson's Column	Jackie Spicer	All 12 episodes
2000	Lock, Stock...	Moira	2 episodes
2001	Doctors	Anita Broughton	Episode: "Sense of Duty"
2002	The American Embassy	Magistrate	Episode: "China Cup"
2006	Doctors	Betty Dillon	Episode: "Honourable Gentlemen "
2008	Doctors	Jeanette Cooper	Episode: "Parting Glances"
2011	Doctors	Dorien Frost-Griffiths	Episode: "Ring Me, Marry Me, Text Me, Kill Me"
2013	Doctors	Anitta Purchase	Episode: "Exterminating Angel"
2013	The Mimic	Della	Episode: #1.3
2015	Doctors	Sylvia Blim	Episode: "The Route of All Good"
2015	Jonathan Strange & Mr Norrell	Storm Cloud Woman	Episode: "Chapter Two: How Is Lady Pole?"
2015	Casualty	Amy Beth Page	Episode: "The Long Haul"
2015	Walliams & Friend	Various	Episode: "Joanna Lumley"
2017	Born to Kill	Margaret Anderson	All 4 episodes
2017	Quacks	Lady Neilson-Toy	Episode: "The Lady's Abscess"
2019	Cold Call	Elisabeth Wiley	All 4 episodes
2020	The Split	Amanda Venwell	Episode: #2.1
2021	Unforgotten	Suzie Montgomery	Episode: #4.5
2021	Trying	Aunt	Episode: "I'm Scared"
2022	Call the Midwife	Mrs. Nyall	Episode: #11.1
2022	The Outlaws	Barbara	Episode: #2.4
2022	Miss Scarlet and The Duke	Mrs. Dashwood	Episode: "The Black Witch Moth"
2023	Doctors	Dorothy Bisset	Episode: "I Don't Want Any Fuss"
2024	EastEnders	Gloria Knight	Guest role
