= The Jury =

The Jury may refer to:

- Jury, a body of persons convened to render a verdict in a legal situation
- The Jury (comics), a fictional group of armored vigilantes in the Marvel Comics universe
- The Jury (TV serial), a 2002 British miniseries starring Gerard Butler and Derek Jacobi, with a second, unconnected series in 2011
- The Jury (TV series), a 2004 American television series
- The Jury: Murder Trial, British reality television series
- "The Jury", a song by Morphine from Yes
- A Time to Kill (1996 film), titled in some languages as "The Jury."

== See also ==
- Jury (disambiguation)
