= Melanie Counsell =

British visual artist, sculptor (born 1964)

- Born: 25 January 1964 (age 62); Pontypridd, Wales
- Education: South Glamorgan Institute of Higher Education; Slade School of Fine Art
- Occupations: Visual artist; Installation artist; Sculptor
- Years active: 1989–present

Melanie Counsell (born in 1964) is a Welsh artist. She works with a multitude of media such as, sculpture, installation, 16 mm film, drawing, printed matter. Counsell has been resident at a range of art institutions, has undertaken roles in teaching and has won multiple awards for her works.

== Early life and education ==
Counsell was born in Pontypridd, Wales, and from 1983 to 1986, studied for a Bachelor of Fine Arts degree in Fine Art at the South Glamorgan Institute of Higher Education. Counsell subsequently studied for a Master of Fine Arts degree in Fine Art at the Slade School of Fine Art part of the University College London between 1986 and 1988.

== Career ==
In 1987, Counsell won the Mary Rischgitz Prize, then the Boise Travel Scholarship in 1988 and the Whitechapel Artists Award in 1989. In November 1989, she modified Matt's Gallery existing space to convey the effect of a prior experience of desolation with water dripping and oozing from a rolled carpet to the floor. At Counsell's post-graduate exhibition in 1990, her work attracted attention with an installation with water dripping and seeping through lockers air vents in the Slade's corridor. Using the water was used in the smaller 12 Filing Cabinets, 12 Rolled Carpets and Water that revealed soaking rolls of carpets in the bottom drawers. In 1991, she was resident of the Fondation Cartier pour l'Art Contemporain, Jouy-en-Josas, France and then of the L'Ecole National des Beaux-Arts, Bourges the following year.

On a commission from the organisation Artangel Trust, Counsell installed a black-and-white film showing glass contents slowly evaporating obscured by an opaque plastic screen making it solely watchable at the back making one aware of the process of observation and place at the Coronet Theatre, London in 1993. She won The Arts Foundation Award in Sculpture in 1994, and the Paul Hamlyn Foundation Award to Individual Artists: Sculpture & Installation two years later. In 1996, Counsell's work 110 Euston Road featured a film installed in a tower block basement recording the sight atop a building and then the descent as the camera was broken from being thrown down it. She moved to France and began teaching at the École Supérieur d’Art de Bordeaux in 1997 before moving to the École Supérieur d’Art de Bordeaux in 1998. Four years later, Counsell received the London Arts Individual Artist Award. In 2004, she created the 2-minute, 48-second black-and-white 16 mm silent water film Untitled mounted on scaffolding plates forming a triangular shape showing a rubbish lorry being driven by a duo of rubbish collectors who pick up bags of rubbish down a one-way street.

In 2006, Counsell became a resident of the Ateliers Internationaux du Frac des Pays de la Loire, and then of the British School at Rome by earning the Sargant Fellowship in 2007. She was resident at the Frac Corsica, Ajaccio in 2008 and of the Visual Arts Creative Development Programme, Cove Park, Scotland, in 2009. In 2011, Counsell made Lutecia depicting details of a headless bondaged-clothed female mannequin in the window of a London sex store close to her residence. She was appointed external examiner of the Edinburgh College of Art at the University of Edinburgh and held the same position at the University of Gloucestershire for students sitting a Bachelor's degree in Fine Art in 2013. Counsell has gone on group or solo exhibitions all over the world to showcase her works which have also been covered in the press. Her works are featured in corporate and private collections in France, Germany, Switzerland and the United Kingdom.

== Analysis ==
Counsell uses a multitude of media such as 16mm film, drawing, printed matter, sculpture and sound for context. She created works in disused buildings and gallery installations creating "new psychological environments through intense manipulation of time and space, architecture and object." Counsell's recent works were on "new psychological environments through intense manipulation of time and space, architecture and object." Caroline Smith of Women's Art Magazine wrote that Counsell's works "has a maturity which surpasses much contemporary installation work, where concepts become lost in the environment and meanings are muddled or over-worked, sledgehammer-style." Smith also noted that the artist "opened herself to the increase of fast, shiny media language, art which addresses a mish-mash of cultures, signs and symbols, out of which have been born more global codes of understanding." Artforum's Michael Corris noted her appeal was "in its capacity to debunk a viewer's preconceived expectations of art" and the success was down to the "possibility of constructing a convincing rebuttal to our art-perceiving expectations."
