= Mary Kerridge =

English actress and theatre director (1914–1999)

- Born: Mary Antoinette Kerridge; 3 April 1914; London, England, United Kingdom
- Died: 22 July 1999 (aged 85); Windsor, Berkshire, England, United Kingdom
- Occupation: Actress
- Spouse: John Counsell (m. 1939; died 1987)
- Children: Elizabeth Counsell
- Relatives: David Simeon (son-in-law)

Mary Antoinette Counsell (3 April 1914 – 22 July 1999), professionally known as Mary Kerridge, was an English actress and theatre director, who (with her husband, John Counsell) ran the Theatre Royal, Windsor and its in-house repertory company from the 1930s to the 1980s.

== Early life ==
Born in Islington to Ernest Kerridge and Antoinette Fick, she attended Highbury Hill School from 1924 to 1928. Her family later moved to Esher, Surrey and she attended Wimbledon High School from January 1929 to July 1932, having taken her London University Higher Certificate in English, French, Modern History and German in June 1932. At University College London, she studied for the (one year) Intermediate Arts BA. She worked as a secretary, model and receptionist before making her name as an actress.

== Career ==
Beginning her career in the repertory companies of Margate, Southsea and Bath, Kerridge made her West End debut in 1937 with Edgar Wallace's The Squeaker. She then based herself in Windsor, running the Theatre Royal and its in-house repertory company, whilst also directing and performing. During the Second World War she toured with Donald Wolfitt's travelling Shakespearean company.

After the war she appeared in a number of West End productions under her husband's direction, amongst them Tyrone Guthrie's only play as a writer (Top Of The Ladder at the St James' theatre in 1950). At the Regent's Park Open Air Theatre she was directed by the theatre's founder as Rosalind in As You Like It and Imogen in Cymbeline. In 1955 she played Queen Elizabeth in the Laurence Olivier film of Richard III, then reprised the role for Olivier's company at The Old Vic in 1962 (opposite Paul Daneman's Richard), alongside the part of Portia in Julius Caesar. In 1963 and 1964 she appeared alongside Michael MacLiammoir at the Gaiety Theatre, Dublin and the Vaudeville Theatre, respectively.

== Personal life and death ==
Kerridge married actor and director John Counsell in 1939. Counsell died in 1987. Their marriage produced two children, twin daughters, one of who is the actress Elizabeth Counsell.

Kerridge died in Windsor on 22 July 1999, at the age of 85. She was buried at St George's Chapel, Windsor. Fittingly, the chapel is also the resting place of Elizabeth Woodville, the Queen Elizabeth in Richard III that Kerridge famously played.

== Filmography ==
Year	Title	Role	Notes
1937	Jump for Glory		
1948	Anna Karenina	Dolly Oblonsky	
1948	Under the Frozen Falls	Mrs. Riley	
1955	The Blue Peter	Mrs. Snow	
1955	Richard III	Queen Elizabeth	
1958	The Duke Wore Jeans	Queen	
1958	Law and Disorder	Lady Crichton	
1965	Curse of Simba	Janet's mother	
1976	No Longer Alone	Lady Home	
