= Late Night Counsell =

- Genre: Talk show
- Running time: 2 hours
- Country of origin: Canada
- Language: English
- Home station: Online
- Hosted by: John Counsell
- Original release: September 1998 – present
- Opening theme: This is Late Night Counsell, right?
- Website: LateNightCounsell.com
- Podcast: Podcasts

Late Night Counsell or LNC is a late night conservative talk show hosted by Rev. John Counsell. It used to air on the radio station CFRA in Ottawa, Ontario. Originally airing weeknights from 10:00 pm to midnight, then later moved to 9:00 pm to 11:00 pm, it discussed various newsmaking stories of the day.

Late Night Counsell started broadcasting in Ottawa once a week from Brandon, Manitoba in the September 1998. The host then moved to Ottawa in 1999 and LNC started broadcasting in its 10 pm to 12 am time slot. In April 2012, the show moved time slots from 10pm to 9pm.

The show was terminated by CFRA in February 2016. He was replaced by Brian Lilley. In a parting tweet, Counsell tweeted “As of 10:45 this morning I have been terminated from CFRA. My last show was last night. Bell Media thinks they are in charge. God is!!!”.

His new online show debuted Monday Night May 9, 2016 and can be heard at www.LateNightCounsell.com. As of June 6, it now broadcasts Live 2hrs a day, Monday to Friday in its original time slot of 9pm Eastern with the Thursday show being a repeat of the Wednesday night "Ask the Pastor". Friday Frenzy has also changed to Freebie Fridays where callers can participate and win prizes.

The show and website are no longer active as of 2019.

== Format ==
The show now airs LIVE Mon - Fri every night at 9pm Eastern. Fans can listen at the Official Website and are invited to call in and participate. Emails are also occasionally read on Air.

=== Monday and Tuesday ===
Late Night Counsell discusses News, Politics, Religion and Opinion. There are occasional guests, including former CFRA host Nick Vandergragt, Tom Harris, and John Robson. Every LIVE show always welcomes callers to discuss the topic, talk with guests or bring up their own topic.

=== Wednesday ===
Every Wednesday is "Ask the Pastor" on Late Night Counsell. Rev. John Counsell, is also a full-time pastor, at Vanier Community Church and Bikers Church in Vanier. This show is often a mix of current news, politics and opinion but from a Biblical Perspective as well as taking general questions and personal stories.

=== Thursday ===
Thursdays are a repeat broadcast of Wednesday's "Ask the Pastor". No calls are taken on Thursdays.

=== Friday ===
Freebie Fridays The entire two hours are devoted to fun topics that are not as caller driven. Callers are still invited to participate in the show and can have their name and number put into a bucket. At the end of the show, a winner is picked from the bucket to win a prize package.

=== Special Guests ===
Occasionally guests appeared on the show, and callers could interact with them. For example, Uncle John from Uncle John's Bathroom Reader, had co-hosted a segment of Freebie Fridays. Recent guests of the brand new online show include former CFRA hosts Nick Vandergragt of Nick At Night and John Robson of Thinking Allowed.
