= Theatre Royal, Windsor =

Theatre in Windsor, England

Coordinates: 51.484248°N 0.607692°W

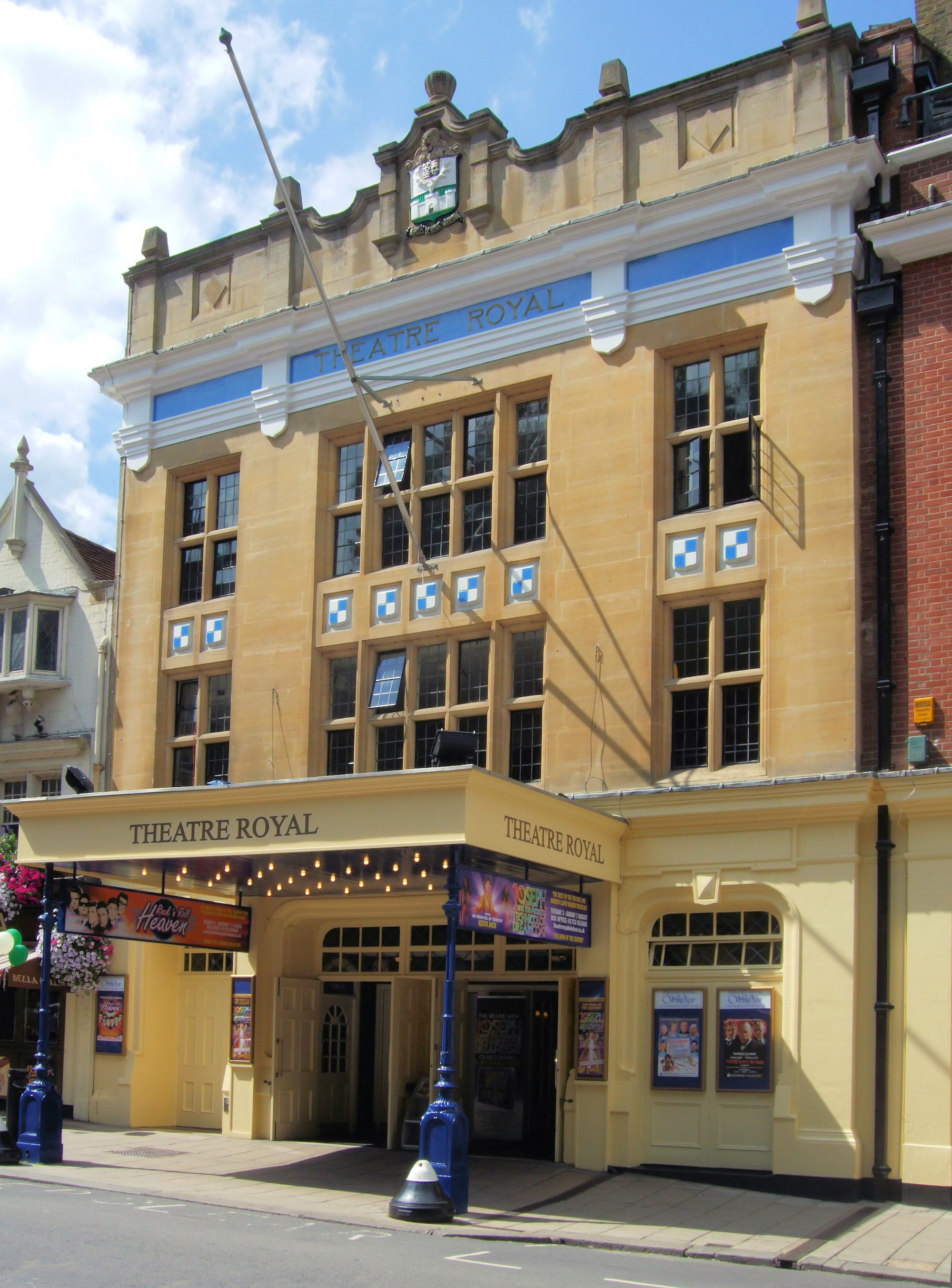
The Theatre Royal in Windsor

The Theatre Royal is an Edwardian theatre on Thames Street in Windsor in Berkshire. The present building is the second theatre to stand on this site and opened on 13 December 1910. Built for Sir William Shipley and Captain Reginald Shipley, it was a replacement for their previous theatre which was built in 1815 and had burnt down in 1908. The present theatre was designed by Frank Verity, the son of the theatre architect Thomas Verity. The building is Grade II listed and is the only unsubsidised producing theatre to operate all year round in the United Kingdom.

== History ==
=== First Theatre Royal (1815–1908) ===
The first Theatre Royal in Windsor was located on the High Street and opened on 12 August 1793. This theatre was described as 'elegant and splendidly ornamented' and opened with a performance of Elizabeth Inchbald's comedy Everyone Has His Fault (1793) and the musical farce Rosina and was attended by King George III and Queen Charlotte. The theatre was only used for six weeks each summer when the nearby Eton College was closed and by 1805 it had been sold to a dissenting sect who converted the building into a chapel. However, local people were unhappy with the loss of their theatre and raised the money to build a new one, this time on Thames Street.

The new Theatre Royal opened on 22 August 1815 with a production of The School for Scandal. In 1845 a tragedy occurred when 63 year-old Mrs. Sarah Hume fell from the gallery into the pit, breaking her back by falling across the benches and dying almost instantaneously. However, minutes later the performance went ahead as usual. Some years the theatre was closed during which period it fell into a dirty and dilapidated state until March 1869 when it was bought by a Mr J. Fremantle who renovated and altered the theatre under the direction of the architect George Somers Leigh Clarke. In his remodelling Clarke added a Royal Box in the expectation that Queen Victoria and other members of the Royal Family would visit the theatre. The theatre was put up for auction in October 1869.

Under the lesseeship of John Restall the theatre underwent further remodelling in 1900 by which time it was named the Theatre Royal and Opera House. These changes resulted in a larger pit and an enlarged Dress Circle, among other changes. New heating was also installed and the theatre was wired for electric light. The Theatre Royal reopened on 31 October 1900 with a performance of Florodora. However, it burnt down on 18 February 1908 with only a small section of the auditorium surviving.

=== Second Theatre Royal, 1910 ===
The rebuilt Theatre Royal opened on 13 December 1910. Built for Sir William Shipley and Captain Reginald Shipley, it was designed by Frank Verity, the son of the theatre architect Thomas Verity.The new theatre's facade was designed in the early English Renaissance style. The auditorium could seat 850 people: 164 in the stalls; 110 in the dress circle; 130 in the upper circle, and 380 in the gallery. In 1921 Sir William Shipley leased the theatre to a Mr Collins and Jack Gladwin; but when Collins died Gladwin became the sole lessee and launched a successful scheme to accommodate touring companies of every kind.

The arrival of talking pictures affected theatre attendance numbers severely and in about 1929 Jack Gladwin converted the Theatre Royal into a cinema. In 1930 John Counsell served as an apprentice at the Theatre Royal when it reopened as a theatre. In 1933 he took over managing the theatre; the venture lasted only a few months before it went bankrupt, but the future King George VI and Queen Elizabeth attended one of the last performances, coming from nearby Windsor Castle. Counsell re-opened the theatre in 1938 and was able to establish a viable company that ran without government subsidies. He and his actress wife Mary Kerridge ran the theatre until his retirement in 1986, the year before his death.

In 1965 the theatre received a major refurbishment and redecoration at a cost in excess of £75,000 undertaken by Carl Toms with the assistance of Sir Anthony Denny, who had been a member of Frank Verity's company, the original architect of the theatre in 1910. Under the management of John Counsell the theatre ran a weekly repertory schedule, changing to fortnightly in the late 1950s and with three-week productions becoming more prevalent in 1963-64. Today the theatre is usually a venue for touring productions, but in addition it produces summer repertory seasons that usually run for about three weeks. The theatre also features an annual pantomime performed in traditional style.

The Theatre Royal in Windsor is a Grade II listed building and since 1997 has been managed by Bill Kenwright, who performed at the theatre as a young actor in the 1960s and 1970s under John Counsell. Under Kenwright's management the repertoire is wide, ranging from the classics and traditional pantomimes to first productions of new work. Many productions which first appear at the Theatre Royal subsequently transfer to the West End or go on national tour.
