= John Counsell (pastor) =

Canadian broadcaster and pastor

- John Counsell
- Born: October 22, 1959 (age 66); Wallaceburg, Ontario
- Presenting career
- Show: Late Night Counsell
- Station: Online
- Time slot: Weeknights 9:00pm to 11:00pm Sundays 7:00am to 8:00am
- Style: talk radio
- Country: Canada

John Counsell (born 22 October 1959) is a Canadian broadcaster and pastor.

Born in Wallaceburg, Ontario, Counsell began pastoring duties in 1981, serving in Canadian communities such as St Catharines, Windsor, Brandon and Neepawa, Manitoba. He has been a talk radio personality since 1982 and is currently host of Late Night Counsell which used to air on 580 CFRA in Ottawa.

Counsell is currently lead pastor at Christ's Church in Ottawa, Ontario. He was previously the lead pastor at Capital City Bikers Church, an associate pastor at Bethel Pentecostal Church, and senior pastor at Parkway Road Pentecostal Church in Greely, Ontario.

Counsell's first cousin once removed is NHLer Darren Helm.

Montreal night-time talk show host Peter Holder of CJAD once delivered newspapers with Counsell in the 1970s.

Counsell believes the COVID-19 pandemic is a hoax.
