= John Counsell (theatre director) =

English actor, director and theatre manager (1905–1987)

John Counsell OBE
- John Counsell
- Born: 24 April 1905; Beckenham, London, England
- Died: 23 February 1987 (aged 81); United Kingdom
- Occupations: Theatre director, actor, theatre manager
- Spouse: Mary Kerridge (m. 1939)
- Children: 2, including Elizabeth Counsell
- Relatives: David Simeon (son-in-law)

John William Counsell OBE (24 April 1905 – 23 February 1987) was an English actor, director and theatre manager, who (with his wife Mary Kerridge) ran the Theatre Royal, Windsor and its in-house repertory company from the 1930s to the 1980s. His daughter is the actress Elizabeth Counsell, and he was uncle to the actress and painter Jean Miller. Born in Beckenham, to Claud Counsell and Evelyn Fleming, the bulk of Counsell's career was spent in Windsor repertory theatre and the West End stage.

== World War II ==
He was the author of the German Instrument of Surrender document signed on 7 May 1945 which he wrote when he served as a colonel in the British Army during World War II.

== Theatre management ==
Theatre Royal, Windsor in 2006

In 1930, Counsell served as an apprentice at the Theatre Royal in Windsor, Berkshire, when it reopened as a theatre after a short time as a cinema. In 1933, he took over managing the theatre; the venture lasted only a few months before it went bankrupt, but the future King George VI and Queen Elizabeth attended one of the last performances, coming from nearby Windsor Castle. Counsell re-opened the theatre in 1938 and was able to establish a viable company that ran without government subsidies. He and his actress wife Mary Kerridge ran the theatre until his retirement in 1986, the year before his death.

John William Counsell was awarded the OBE in the 1975 New Year Honours for services to the Theatre Royal in Windsor.
