= Jury (TV series) =

- Genre: Documentary
- Country of origin: Canada
- Original language: English
- No. of seasons: 1
- No. of episodes: 3

Production
- Producer: Lee Livingstone
- Production location: Edmonton
- Running time: 30 minutes

Original release
- Network: CBC Television
- Release: 4 July – 18 July 1974

Jury is a Canadian documentary television miniseries which aired on CBC Television in 1974.

== Premise ==
This series produced in Edmonton followed the adventures of the rock band Jury, featuring the band members' in the studio, on stage and their lives outside the band's work. It was part of the 5 x 3 collection of regional CBC series.

== Scheduling ==
This half-hour series was broadcast Thursdays at 9:30 p.m. (Eastern) from 4 to 18 July 1974.
