= Listed buildings in Corsham =

Buildings in Corsham, Wiltshire, England

Corsham is a town and civil parish in Wiltshire, England. It contains 409 listed buildings that are recorded in the National Heritage List for England. Of these five is grade I, 21 are grade II* and 383 are grade II.

This list is based on the information retrieved online from Historic England.

== Key ==
Grade	Criteria
I	Buildings that are of exceptional interest
II*	Particularly important buildings of more than special interest
II	Buildings that are of special interest

== Listing ==
Name	Grade	Location	Type	Completed (Note: The date given is the date used by Historic England as significant for the initial building or that of an important part in the structure's description.)	Date designated	Grid ref. (Note: The grid reference is based on the British national grid reference system, sometimes known as OSGB36, used by the Ordnance Survey.) Geo-coordinates	Notes	Entry number (Note: The "List Entry Number" is a unique number assigned to each listed building and scheduled monument by Historic England.)	Image	Wikidata
Milestone on South Side Opposite R.N. Stores, Copenacre	II	A4			1 August 1986	ST8532270370; 51°25′56″N 2°12′45″W		1021962	Upload Photo	Q26272815
The Folly Farmhouse, Barn And Stable	II	A4			1 August 1986	ST8799971593; 51°26′36″N 2°10′27″W		1181800	Upload Photo	Q26477095
Stowells Farmhouse	II	Allington Lane			1 August 1986	ST8798172339; 51°27′00″N 2°10′28″W		1021960	Upload Photo	Q26272813
Roundhouse To South East Of No 51, At Roadside	II	Pickwick			1 August 1986	ST8609670538; 51°26′01″N 2°12′05″W		1022086	Upload Photo	Q26272948
Neston Lodge	II	Atworth Lane, Neston			1 August 1986	ST8648967839; 51°24′34″N 2°11′44″W		1364020	Upload Photo	Q26645816
Neston Park	II*	Atworth Lane			20 December 1960	ST8620667143; 51°24′11″N 2°11′59″W		1021961	Upload Photo	Q6997938
8 And 9, Pound Pill	II	B3353			20 December 1960	ST8739169841; 51°25′39″N 2°10′58″W		1198800	Upload Photo	Q26494761
Little Linleys	II	8, B3353			1 August 1986	ST8776868963; 51°25′10″N 2°10′38″W		1022067	Upload Photo	Q26272926
10, The Linleys	II	B3353			1 August 1986	ST8789768897; 51°25′08″N 2°10′32″W		1198153	Upload Photo	Q26492609
4-10, Bakers Corner	II	4-10, Bakers Corner, Neston			1 August 1986	ST8599467993; 51°24′39″N 2°12′10″W		1364021	Upload Photo	Q26645817
Priory Cottage	II	1, Bences Lane			19 December 1980	ST8721470760; 51°26′08″N 2°11′07″W		1021963	Upload Photo	Q26272816
2 and 3, Bences Lane	II	2 and 3, Bences Lane			19 December 1980	ST8721670786; 51°26′09″N 2°11′07″W		1364022	2 and 3, Bences Lane More images	Q26645818
6, Bences Lane	II	6, Bences Lane			19 December 1980	ST8721070794; 51°26′10″N 2°11′07″W		1021964	6, Bences Lane More images	Q26272818
8 and 9, Bences Lane	II	8 and 9, Bences Lane			19 December 1980	ST8719470798; 51°26′10″N 2°11′08″W		1364023	8 and 9, Bences Lane More images	Q26645819
10, Bences Lane	II	10, Bences Lane			1 August 1986	ST8715270840; 51°26′11″N 2°11′10″W		1021965	Upload Photo	Q26272820
Box Tunnel East Portal (MLN19912)	II	Box			18 July 2012	ST8580069425; 51°25′25″N 2°12′20″W		1409161	Upload Photo	Q26676053
Mod Corsham: Quarry Operations Centre (Qoc) Murals	II*	Box			20 March 2013	ST8477669218; 51°25′18″N 2°13′13″W		1409132	Upload Photo	Q96465063
Mod Corsham: Quarry Operations Centre (Qoc) Murals	II*	Box			20 March 2013	ST8477669218; 51°25′18″N 2°13′13″W		1409132	Upload Photo	Q96465063
Byde Mill	II	Byde Mill Lane			1 August 1986	ST8978069140; 51°25′16″N 2°08′54″W		1021966	Upload Photo	Q26272821
Byde Mill Farmhouse	II	Byde Mill Lane			1 August 1986	ST8971869170; 51°25′17″N 2°08′57″W		1284863	Upload Photo	Q26573602
1, Chapel Hill	II	1, Chapel Hill, Gastard			1 August 1986	ST8884568281; 51°24′48″N 2°09′42″W		1181791	Upload Photo	Q26477088
1, Chapel Lane	II	1, Chapel Lane, Neston			1 August 1986	ST8625968053; 51°24′41″N 2°11′56″W		1284827	Upload Photo	Q26573566
Church of St Phillip and St James	II	Church Rise, Neston			20 December 1960	ST8607768188; 51°24′45″N 2°12′06″W		1181810	Upload Photo	Q26477105
Neston Primary School The Old School House	II	Church Rise, Neston			1 August 1986	ST8605768262; 51°24′48″N 2°12′07″W		1021973	Upload Photo	Q26272830
The Well House	II	Church Rise, Neston			1 August 1986	ST8606968294; 51°24′49″N 2°12′06″W		1181807	Upload Photo	Q26477101
1, Church Rise	II	1, Church Rise, Neston			1 August 1986	ST8610068446; 51°24′53″N 2°12′05″W		1021972	Upload Photo	Q26272829
Armstrong And Dickinson Monuments In Churchyard About 5 Metres North East Of Todd Monument, North Of North Aisle Of Church St Bartholomew	II	Church Square			1 August 1986	ST8743070612; 51°26′04″N 2°10′56″W		1182043	Upload Photo	Q26477321
Arnold Monument In Churchyard About 1 Metre East Of Reynolds Monument, North Of North West End Of Church Of St Bartholomew	II	Church Square			1 August 1986	ST8741870599; 51°26′03″N 2°10′57″W		1284732	Arnold Monument In Churchyard About 1 Metre East Of Reynolds Monument, North Of North West End Of Church Of St Bartholomew More images	Q26573477
Aust Monument In Churchyard About 6 Metres North North West Of Goddard Monument, North Of Transept Of Church Of St Bartholomew	II	Church Square			1 August 1986	ST8744070601; 51°26′03″N 2°10′55″W		1021990	Upload Photo	Q26272847
Batchelor Monument In Churchyard About 5 Metres North East Of Newman Monument, North Of Chancel Of Church Of St Bartholomew	II	Church Square			1 August 1986	ST8745270594; 51°26′03″N 2°10′55″W		1021992	Upload Photo	Q26272849
Bayly Monument In Churchyard About 8 Metres North Of Wastfield Monument, North Of North Transept Of Church Of St Bartholomew	II	Church Square			1 August 1986	ST8743870616; 51°26′04″N 2°10′56″W		1182099	Upload Photo	Q26477374
Brakspear Monument in Churchyard about 4 Metres from East Boundary Wall East of South Aisle of Church of St Bartholomew	II	Church Square			1 August 1986	ST8747970526; 51°26′01″N 2°10′53″W		1022002	Upload Photo	Q26272861
Brewer Monument in Churchyard about 1 Metre East of Morgan Monument South of South East Angle of Church of St Bartholomew	II	Church Square			1 August 1986	ST8743870533; 51°26′01″N 2°10′56″W		1021999	Brewer Monument in Churchyard about 1 Metre East of Morgan Monument South of South East Angle of Church of St Bartholomew More images	Q26272856
Broome Monument In Churchyard About 1 Metre East Of Hayward Monument, North Of North East Angle Of North Aisle Of Church Of St Bartholomew	II	Church Square			1 August 1986	ST8744670565; 51°26′02″N 2°10′55″W		1181957	Broome Monument In Churchyard About 1 Metre East Of Hayward Monument, North Of North East Angle Of North Aisle Of Church Of St Bartholomew More images	Q26477234
Church of St Bartholomew	I	Church Square			20 December 1960	ST8742370549; 51°26′02″N 2°10′56″W		1021975	Church of St Bartholomew More images	Q17529204
Cole Monument In Churchyard About 7 Metres North Of Reynolds Monument, By West Boundary Wall, North Of Church Of St Bartholomew	II	Church Square			1 August 1986	ST8741970608; 51°26′04″N 2°10′57″W		1021984	Cole Monument In Churchyard About 7 Metres North Of Reynolds Monument, By West Boundary Wall, North Of Church Of St Bartholomew More images	Q26272840
Collett Monument in Churchyard about 1 Metre North of North Aisle First Buttress of Church of St Bartholomew	II	Church Square			1 August 1986	ST8741270565; 51°26′02″N 2°10′57″W		1364026	Collett Monument in Churchyard about 1 Metre North of North Aisle First Buttress of Church of St Bartholomew More images	Q26645822
Dancy Monument in Churchyard about 2 Metres North of North Aisle First Window of Church of St Bartholomew	II	Church Square			1 August 1986	ST8741370565; 51°26′02″N 2°10′57″W		1364027	Dancy Monument in Churchyard about 2 Metres North of North Aisle First Window of Church of St Bartholomew More images	Q26645823
Dunsdon And Hulbert Monuments In Churchyard About 1.5 Metres North East Of Brewer Monument, South Of South East Angle Of South Aisle Of Church Of St Bartholomew	II	Church Square			1 August 1986	ST8744170534; 51°26′01″N 2°10′55″W		1364005	Dunsdon And Hulbert Monuments In Churchyard About 1.5 Metres North East Of Brewer Monument, South Of South East Angle Of South Aisle Of Church Of St Bartholomew More images	Q26645800
Ford Monument in Churchyard about 2 Metres South East of South East Buttress of South Aisle of Church of St Bartholomew	II	Church Square			1 August 1986	ST8743970538; 51°26′01″N 2°10′56″W		1022000	Upload Photo	Q26272858
G. Neale Monument In Churchyard About 1 Metre North Of S. Neale Monument, North Of North West End Of Church Of St Bartholomew	II	Church Square			1 August 1986	ST8742070603; 51°26′03″N 2°10′56″W		1284739	G. Neale Monument In Churchyard About 1 Metre North Of S. Neale Monument, North Of North West End Of Church Of St Bartholomew More images	Q26573484
Gatepiers at East End of Church Street	II	Church Square			1 August 1986	ST8735870548; 51°26′02″N 2°11′00″W		1021974	Upload Photo	Q26272831
Gatepiers to Churchyard of Church of St Bartholemew	II	Church Square			1 August 1986	ST8739770543; 51°26′01″N 2°10′58″W		1364025	Upload Photo	Q26645821
Goddard Monument In Churchyard About 30 Metres North Of North East Angle Of North Transept Of Church Of St Bartholomew	II	Church Square			1 August 1986	ST8744070590; 51°26′03″N 2°10′55″W		1182109	Upload Photo	Q26477384
Guy Monument In Churchyard About 3 Metres North Of S. Guy Monument, North Of North Aisle Door Of Church Of St Bartholomew	II	Church Square			1 August 1986	ST8742770583; 51°26′03″N 2°10′56″W		1284799	Guy Monument In Churchyard About 3 Metres North Of S. Guy Monument, North Of North Aisle Door Of Church Of St Bartholomew More images	Q26573541
Hawkins Monument in Churchyard about 12 Metres South of Chancel of Church of St Bartholomew	II	Church Square			1 August 1986	ST8743070527; 51°26′01″N 2°10′56″W		1364003	Hawkins Monument in Churchyard about 12 Metres South of Chancel of Church of St Bartholomew More images	Q26645798
Hayward Monument in Churchyard about 10 Metres North of North East Angle of North Aisle of Church of St Bartholomew	II	Church Square			1 August 1986	ST8744470566; 51°26′02″N 2°10′55″W		1364030	Hayward Monument in Churchyard about 10 Metres North of North East Angle of North Aisle of Church of St Bartholomew More images	Q26645826
Howse Monument in Churchyard about 2 Metres North of North Aisle First Buttress of Church of St Bartholomew	II	Church Square			1 August 1986	ST8741270566; 51°26′02″N 2°10′57″W		1021977	Howse Monument in Churchyard about 2 Metres North of North Aisle First Buttress of Church of St Bartholomew More images	Q26272833
Hulbert Monument in Churchyard about 4 Metres South of South Door of Tower of Church of St Bartholomew	II	Church Square			1 August 1986	ST8742370530; 51°26′01″N 2°10′56″W		1021997	Hulbert Monument in Churchyard about 4 Metres South of South Door of Tower of Church of St Bartholomew More images	Q26272854
Hulbert Monument in Churchyard by North Churchyard Wall about 26 Metres East of South Aisle of Church of St Bartholomew	II	Church Square			1 August 1986	ST8746270537; 51°26′01″N 2°10′54″W		1182216	Upload Photo	Q26477479
Isaac Monument About 4 Metres South Of North Boundary Wall, In North East Angle Of Churchyard Of Church Of St Bartholomew	II	Church Square			1 August 1986	ST8745270616; 51°26′04″N 2°10′55″W		1021993	Isaac Monument About 4 Metres South Of North Boundary Wall, In North East Angle Of Churchyard Of Church Of St Bartholomew More images	Q26272850
J. Chanter Monument In Churchyard About 1 Metre East Of M. Chanter Monument North East Of North Aisle Of Church Of St Bartholomew	II	Church Square			1 August 1986	ST8744870562; 51°26′02″N 2°10′55″W		1181966	J. Chanter Monument In Churchyard About 1 Metre East Of M. Chanter Monument North East Of North Aisle Of Church Of St Bartholomew More images	Q26477244
Lyne Monument In Churchyard About 2 Metres North West Of Mary Guy Monument, North Of North Aisle Of Church Of St Bartholomew	II	Church Square			1 August 1986	ST8742670587; 51°26′03″N 2°10′56″W		1284772	Lyne Monument In Churchyard About 2 Metres North West Of Mary Guy Monument, North Of North Aisle Of Church Of St Bartholomew More images	Q26573516
M Guy Monument In Churchyard About 4 Metres North Of S. Guy Monument, North Of North Aisle Door Of Church Of St Bartholomew	II	Church Square			1 August 1986	ST8742770584; 51°26′03″N 2°10′56″W		1364029	M Guy Monument In Churchyard About 4 Metres North Of S. Guy Monument, North Of North Aisle Door Of Church Of St Bartholomew More images	Q26645825
M. Chanter Monument In Churchyard, About 2 Metres South Of Broome Monument, North East Of North Aisle Of Church Of St Bartholomew	II	Church Square			1 August 1986	ST8744670563; 51°26′02″N 2°10′55″W		1021982	M. Chanter Monument In Churchyard, About 2 Metres South Of Broome Monument, North East Of North Aisle Of Church Of St Bartholomew More images	Q26272838
M. Hulbert Monument In Churchyard About 4 Metres South East Of East Hulbert Monument, South East Of South East Angle Of South Aisle Of Church Of St Bartholomew	II	Church Square			1 August 1986	ST8744470529; 51°26′01″N 2°10′55″W		1182192	M. Hulbert Monument In Churchyard About 4 Metres South East Of East Hulbert Monument, South East Of South East Angle Of South Aisle Of Church Of St Bartholomew More images	Q26477460
Manley Monument In Churchyard About 4 Metres East Of Pocock Monument, About 19 Metres North Of North Transept Of Church Of St Bartholomew	II	Church Square			1 August 1986	ST8743270579; 51°26′03″N 2°10′56″W		1181937	Manley Monument In Churchyard About 4 Metres East Of Pocock Monument, About 19 Metres North Of North Transept Of Church Of St Bartholomew More images	Q26477215
Melsome Monument about 6 Metres East South East of Isaac Monument at North East Angle of Churchyard of Church of St Bartholomew	II	Church Square			1 August 1986	ST8745970614; 51°26′04″N 2°10′54″W		1021994	Melsome Monument about 6 Metres East South East of Isaac Monument at North East Angle of Churchyard of Church of St Bartholomew More images	Q26272851
Milsom Monument At North East Corner Of Churchyard Of Church Of St Bartholomew	II	Church Square			1 August 1986	ST8745770617; 51°26′04″N 2°10′55″W		1182136	Upload Photo	Q26477410
Morgan Monument in Churchyard about 7 Metres South of South East Angle of Church of Bartholomew	II	Church Square			1 July 1986	ST8743670534; 51°26′01″N 2°10′56″W		1021998	Upload Photo	Q26272855
Newman Monument In Churchyard About 4 Metres North East Of Goddard Monument, North Of North East Chapel Of Church Of St Bartholomew	II	Church Square			1 August 1986	ST8744770592; 51°26′03″N 2°10′55″W		1284702	Upload Photo	Q26573449
Pocock Monument In Churchyard About 1 Metre East Of S. Guy Monument, North Of North Aisle Door Of Church Of St Bartholomew	II	Church Square			1 August 1986	ST8742870580; 51°26′03″N 2°10′56″W		1021981	Pocock Monument In Churchyard About 1 Metre East Of S. Guy Monument, North Of North Aisle Door Of Church Of St Bartholomew More images	Q26272837
Reynolds Monument In Churchyard By West Boundary Wall, About 41 Metres North Of North West End Of Church Of St Bartholomew	II	About 41 Metres North Of North West End Of Church Of St Bartholomew, Church Square			1 August 1986	ST8741670600; 51°26′03″N 2°10′57″W		1364031	Reynolds Monument In Churchyard By West Boundary Wall, About 41 Metres North Of North West End Of Church Of St Bartholomew More images	Q26645827
S. Guy Monument in Churchyard about 25 Metres North of North Aisle Door of Church of St Bartholomew	II	Church Square			1 August 1986	ST8742570580; 51°26′03″N 2°10′56″W		1021980	S. Guy Monument in Churchyard about 25 Metres North of North Aisle Door of Church of St Bartholomew More images	Q26272836
Sweatman Monument In Churchyard About 3 Metres South Of Churchyard North Wall, North Of North Transept Of Church Of St Bartholomew	II	Church Square			1 August 1986	ST8743870622; 51°26′04″N 2°10′56″W		1021987	Upload Photo	Q26272844
Taylor Monument In Churchyard About 3 Metres East Of Townsend Monument, South Of Porch Of Church Of St Bartholomew	II	Church Square			1 August 1986	ST8741970531; 51°26′01″N 2°10′57″W		1364002	Taylor Monument In Churchyard About 3 Metres East Of Townsend Monument, South Of Porch Of Church Of St Bartholomew More images	Q26645797
Townsend Monument in Churchyard about 9 Metres South of South Porch of Church of St Bartholomew	II	Church Square			1 August 1986	ST8741570533; 51°26′01″N 2°10′57″W		1021995	Townsend Monument in Churchyard about 9 Metres South of South Porch of Church of St Bartholomew More images	Q26272852
Unidentified Monument in Churchyard about 1 Metre East of South Aisle of Church of St Bartholomew	II	Church Square			1 August 1986	ST8743970543; 51°26′01″N 2°10′56″W		1364004	Unidentified Monument in Churchyard about 1 Metre East of South Aisle of Church of St Bartholomew More images	Q26645799
Unidentified Monument in Churchyard about 1 Metre North East of J. Chanter Monument North East of North Aisle of Church of St Bartholomew	II	Church Square			1 August 1986	ST8745070563; 51°26′02″N 2°10′55″W		1021983	Unidentified Monument in Churchyard about 1 Metre North East of J. Chanter Monument North East of North Aisle of Church of St Bartholomew More images	Q26272839
Unidentified Monument in Churchyard about 1 Metre North of G. Neale Monument North of North West End of Church of St Bartholomew	II	Church Square			1 August 1986	ST8741970602; 51°26′03″N 2°10′57″W		1021985	Unidentified Monument in Churchyard about 1 Metre North of G. Neale Monument North of North West End of Church of St Bartholomew More images	Q26272842
Unidentified Monument In Churchyard About 12 Metres South Of Sweatman Monument North Of North Transept Of Church Of St Bartholomew	II	Church Square			1 August 1986	ST8743570609; 51°26′04″N 2°10′56″W		1182092	Upload Photo	Q26477368
Unidentified Monument In Churchyard About 13 Metres North Of Goddard Monument, North Of North Transept Of Church Of St Bartholomew	II	Church Square			1 August 1986	ST8744570605; 51°26′03″N 2°10′55″W		1284667	Upload Photo	Q26573415
Unidentified Monument in Churchyard about 18 Metres North of North Aisle Door of Church of St Bartholomew	II	Church Square			1 August 1986	ST8742370575; 51°26′03″N 2°10′56″W		1021978	Unidentified Monument in Churchyard about 18 Metres North of North Aisle Door of Church of St Bartholomew More images	Q26272834
Unidentified Monument in Churchyard about 19 Metres North of North Aisle Door of Church of St Bartholomew	II	Church Square			1 August 1986	ST8742370576; 51°26′03″N 2°10′56″W		1021979	Unidentified Monument in Churchyard about 19 Metres North of North Aisle Door of Church of St Bartholomew More images	Q26272835
Unidentified Monument In Churchyard About 2 Metres South East Of J. Chanter Monument, North East Of North East Angle Of North Aisle Of Church Of St Bartholomew	II	Church Square			1 August 1986	ST8744970561; 51°26′02″N 2°10′55″W		1284758	Unidentified Monument In Churchyard About 2 Metres South East Of J. Chanter Monument, North East Of North East Angle Of North Aisle Of Church Of St Bartholomew More images	Q26573503
Unidentified Monument in Churchyard about 20 Metres North of North Aisle Door of Church of St Bartholomew	II	Church Square			1 August 1986	ST8742470577; 51°26′03″N 2°10′56″W		1364028	Upload Photo	Q26645824
Unidentified Monument In Churchyard About 22 Metres South Of South Aisle Of Church Of St Bartholomew	II	Church Square			1 August 1986	ST8740370526; 51°26′01″N 2°10′57″W		1182139	Unidentified Monument In Churchyard About 22 Metres South Of South Aisle Of Church Of St Bartholomew More images	Q26477412
Unidentified Monument In Churchyard About 3 Metres North East Of S. Neale Monument, North Of North Aisle Of Church Of St Bartholomew	II	Church Square			1 August 1986	ST8742570601; 51°26′03″N 2°10′56″W		1284706	Unidentified Monument In Churchyard About 3 Metres North East Of S. Neale Monument, North Of North Aisle Of Church Of St Bartholomew More images	Q26573453
Unidentified Monument In Churchyard About 4 Metres East Of S. Neale Monument, North Of North Aisle Of Church Of St Bartholomew	II	Church Square			1 August 1986	ST8742570598; 51°26′03″N 2°10′56″W		1021986	Upload Photo	Q26272843
Unidentified Monument in Churchyard about 4 Metres South of M. Hulbert Monument South East of Church of St Bartholomew	II	Church Square			1 August 1986	ST8744370524; 51°26′01″N 2°10′55″W		1022001	Unidentified Monument in Churchyard about 4 Metres South of M. Hulbert Monument South East of Church of St Bartholomew More images	Q26272859
Unidentified Monument in Churchyard about 5 Metres North North East of Goddard Monument North of North Transept of Church of St Bartholomew	II	Church Square			1 August 1986	ST8744470595; 51°26′03″N 2°10′55″W		1021991	Upload Photo	Q26272848
Unidentified Monument In Churchyard About 7 Metres North North West Of Goddard Monument, North Of Transept Of Church Of St Bartholomew	II	Church Square			1 August 1986	ST8744070603; 51°26′03″N 2°10′55″W		1182117	Upload Photo	Q26477392
Unidentified Monument in Churchyard about 7 Metres North of Wastfield Monument North of North Transept of Church of St Bartholomew	II	Church Square			1 August 1986	ST8743870614; 51°26′04″N 2°10′56″W		1021988	Upload Photo	Q26272845
Unidentified Monument In Churchyard About 9 Metres North Of Wastfield Monument, North Of North Transept Of Church Of St Bartholomew	II	Church Square			1 August 1986	ST8743970617; 51°26′04″N 2°10′56″W		1021989	Upload Photo	Q26272846
Unidentified Monument in Churchyard about 9 Metres South of Townsend Monument South of Porch of Church of St Bartholomew	II	Church Square			1 August 1986	ST8741270524; 51°26′01″N 2°10′57″W		1021996	Upload Photo	Q26272853
Unidentified Monument In Churchyard, About 2 Metres North Of West End Of North Aisle Of Church Of St Bartholomew	II	Church Square			1 August 1986	ST8741170565; 51°26′02″N 2°10′57″W		1021976	Unidentified Monument In Churchyard, About 2 Metres North Of West End Of North Aisle Of Church Of St Bartholomew More images	Q26272832
Wastfield Monument in Churchyard about 13 Metres South South East of Sweatman Monument North of North Transept of Church of St Bartholomew	II	Church Square			1 August 1986	ST8743670608; 51°26′04″N 2°10′56″W		1364001	Upload Photo	Q26645796
West Monument In Churchyard About 5 Metres South East Of S. Neale Monument, North Of North Aisle Of Church Of St Bartholomew	II	Church Square			1 August 1986	ST8742570594; 51°26′03″N 2°10′56″W		1284742	Upload Photo	Q26573487
Stables, Riding School And Entrance Archway To Corsham Court Stables, Riding School And South Entrance Arch	II*	Church Square, Corsham Court			20 December 1960	ST8737770579; 51°26′03″N 2°10′59″W		1182308	Stables, Riding School And Entrance Archway To Corsham Court Stables, Riding School And South Entrance Arch More images	Q17543326
1, Church Street	II	1, Church Street			20 December 1960	ST8727870551; 51°26′02″N 2°11′04″W		1364006	1, Church Street More images	Q26645801
2, Church Street	II	2, Church Street			1 December 1972	ST8728870549; 51°26′02″N 2°11′03″W		1182269	2, Church Street More images	Q26477531
3, Church Street	II	3, Church Street			1 December 1972	ST8729770546; 51°26′02″N 2°11′03″W		1022003	3, Church Street More images	Q26272862
4 And 5, Church Street	II	4 and 5, Church Street			20 December 1960	ST8731670543; 51°26′01″N 2°11′02″W		1182272	4 And 5, Church Street More images	Q26477534
Ethelred House	II	6, Church Street			20 December 1960	ST8732670558; 51°26′02″N 2°11′01″W		1364007	Ethelred House More images	Q26645802
7-10, Church Street	II	7-10, Church Street			20 December 1960	ST8730870561; 51°26′02″N 2°11′02″W		1182279	7-10, Church Street More images	Q26477541
Barn in Estate Yard	II	Corsham Court			1 August 1986	ST8734270744; 51°26′08″N 2°11′01″W		1022007	Upload Photo	Q26272865
Conduit House in Arboretum to North of Kitchen Gardens	II	Corsham Court			1 August 1986	ST8731370993; 51°26′16″N 2°11′02″W		1364009	Upload Photo	Q26645804
Corsham Court	I	Corsham Court			20 December 1960	ST8741570684; 51°26′06″N 2°10′57″W		1022004	Corsham Court More images	Q17529210
Dovecote 75M North-West Of Corsham Court	II	Corsham Court			2 February 2017	ST8731570756; 51°26′08″N 2°11′02″W		1440882	Upload Photo	Q17674785
Gatepiers At North East Entrance To Corsham Park	II*	Corsham Court			20 December 1960	ST8905971591; 51°26′36″N 2°09′32″W		1181798	Upload Photo	Q17543257
Gatepiers To South Avenue Gatepiers To South Avenue Of Corsham Court	II	Corsham Court			20 December 1960	ST8728070209; 51°25′51″N 2°11′04″W		1022063	Gatepiers To South Avenue Gatepiers To South Avenue Of Corsham Court More images	Q26272921
Granary 77m NW of Corsham Court	II	Corsham Court			1 August 1986	ST8731870763; 51°26′09″N 2°11′02″W		1284562	Upload Photo	Q26573321
Lake Cottage Lake House	II	Corsham Court, Westrop			20 December 1960	ST8835370398; 51°25′57″N 2°10′08″W		1199230	Upload Photo	Q26495129
Rear Gatepiers and Wall Extending South East to No 112 High Street and North West to End Wall of Timber Store in Estate Yard	II	Corsham Court			1 August 1986	ST8731170705; 51°26′07″N 2°11′02″W		1182461	Upload Photo	Q26477709
The Bath House	I	Corsham Court			20 December 1960	ST8739470859; 51°26′12″N 2°10′58″W		1182390	The Bath House More images	Q26268189
The Bradford Porch in Garden to Rear of Bath House	II	Corsham Court			1 August 1986	ST8738970857; 51°26′12″N 2°10′58″W		1022006	Upload Photo	Q26272864
The Coach House	II	Corsham Court			1 August 1986	ST8733270588; 51°26′03″N 2°11′01″W		1022005	Upload Photo	Q26272863
The Old Laundry Cottage and Attached Range	II	Corsham Court			1 August 1986	ST8735270693; 51°26′06″N 2°11′00″W		1284559	Upload Photo	Q26573318
The Sham Ruin	II*	Corsham Court			1 August 1986	ST8734070575; 51°26′03″N 2°11′01″W		1284571	The Sham Ruin More images	Q17546090
Timber Store on West Side of Estate Yard	II	Corsham Court			1 August 1986	ST8729170756; 51°26′08″N 2°11′03″W		1182440	Upload Photo	Q26477688
Walls and Gates to Each Side of South Garden at Corsham Court	II	Corsham Court			20 December 1960	ST8742170618; 51°26′04″N 2°10′56″W		1364008	Upload Photo	Q26645803
Walls to Walled Garden and Gardener's House Attached	II	Corsham Court			1 August 1986	ST8733270886; 51°26′13″N 2°11′01″W		1022008	Upload Photo	Q26272867
Workshop Range on South Side of Estate Yard	II	Corsham Court			1 August 1986	ST8731670722; 51°26′07″N 2°11′02″W		1364010	Upload Photo	Q26645805
The Cross Keys Inn	II	Cross Keys			1 August 1986	ST8718571339; 51°26′27″N 2°11′09″W		1182487	The Cross Keys Inn More images	Q26477733
Cheltenham Cottage	II	1, Cross Keys			1 August 1986	ST8721071043; 51°26′18″N 2°11′07″W		1182473	Upload Photo	Q26477720
2-4, Cross Keys	II	2-4, Cross Keys			1 August 1986	ST8715671240; 51°26′24″N 2°11′10″W		1022009	Upload Photo	Q26272868
The Lodge	II	6, Cross Keys			1 August 1986	ST8714171324; 51°26′27″N 2°11′11″W		1364011	Upload Photo	Q26645806
11, Cross Keys	II	11, Cross Keys, SN13 0DT			1 August 1986	ST8716271343; 51°26′27″N 2°11′10″W		1022010	Upload Photo	Q26272869
14 and 15, Cross Keys	II	14 and 15, Cross Keys			1 August 1986	ST8720271366; 51°26′28″N 2°11′08″W		1182491	Upload Photo	Q26477737
16, Cross Keys	II	16, Cross Keys			1 August 1986	ST8720271355; 51°26′28″N 2°11′08″W		1364012	Upload Photo	Q26645807
Barn to East of Easton Farmhouse	II	Easton			1 August 1986	ST8914570776; 51°26′09″N 2°09′27″W		1022011	Upload Photo	Q26272870
Barn to South of Easton Court Farmhouse	II	Easton			1 August 1986	ST8905370595; 51°26′03″N 2°09′32″W		1022014	Upload Photo	Q26272873
Barn to South West of Easton Court Farmhouse	II	Easton			1 August 1986	ST8908570590; 51°26′03″N 2°09′30″W		1022015	Upload Photo	Q26272874
Coach House at Easton House	II	Easton			20 December 1960	ST8898670415; 51°25′57″N 2°09′35″W		1022019	Upload Photo	Q26272878
Dovecote 30M West Of Easton House	II*	Easton			20 December 1960	ST8895770430; 51°25′58″N 2°09′37″W		1022020	Upload Photo	Q17534018
Easton Court Farmhouse	II	Easton			1 August 1986	ST8906670635; 51°26′05″N 2°09′31″W		1022013	Upload Photo	Q26272872
Easton Farmhouse	II	Easton			1 August 1986	ST8912570746; 51°26′08″N 2°09′28″W		1182495	Upload Photo	Q26477741
Number 6, Easton	II	Easton			1 August 1986	ST8908870678; 51°26′06″N 2°09′30″W		1284492	Upload Photo	Q26683418
Number 9, Easton	II	Easton			1 August 1986	ST8896570518; 51°26′01″N 2°09′36″W		1022016	Upload Photo	Q26272876
Numbers 10-13 Easton	II	10-13, Easton			20 December 1960	ST8899770471; 51°25′59″N 2°09′35″W		1364013	Upload Photo	Q26645808
Outbuilding to West of Easton House	II	Easton			20 December 1960	ST8899170435; 51°25′58″N 2°09′35″W		1364015	Upload Photo	Q26645810
Porch to Easton House	II	Easton			1 August 1986	ST8901370443; 51°25′58″N 2°09′34″W		1364014	Upload Photo	Q26645809
Sparrows Barton	II	Easton			1 August 1986	ST8899970644; 51°26′05″N 2°09′35″W		1022012	Upload Photo	Q26272871
The Roebuck Inn	II	Easton			20 December 1960	ST8904970009; 51°25′44″N 2°09′32″W		1364016	Upload Photo	Q26645811
Smithfield Cottages	II	1-3, Easton			1 August 1986	ST8902570791; 51°26′10″N 2°09′33″W		1182530	Upload Photo	Q26477776
Number 15, Easton	II	Easton			1 August 1986	ST8903170452; 51°25′59″N 2°09′33″W		1022017	Upload Photo	Q26272877
Easton House	II*	Easton			20 December 1960	ST8900670435; 51°25′58″N 2°09′34″W		1022018	Upload Photo	Q17534006
Barn At Chapel Knapp Farm	II	B3353, Gastard			1 August 1986	ST8849568047; 51°24′41″N 2°10′01″W		1181792	Upload Photo	Q26477089
Barn at Gastard Court Farm	II	Gastard			1 August 1986	ST8904768213; 51°24′46″N 2°09′32″W		1022021	Upload Photo	Q26272880
Boyds Farmhouse	II	B3353, Gastard			1 August 1986	ST8803267882; 51°24′35″N 2°10′24″W		1021967	Upload Photo	Q26272823
Chapel Knapp Farmhouse	II	B3353, Gastard			1 August 1986	ST8849568048; 51°24′41″N 2°10′01″W		1364024	Upload Photo	Q26645820
Gastard Court Farmhouse	II	Gastard			20 December 1960	ST8902168209; 51°24′46″N 2°09′33″W		1284461	Upload Photo	Q26573226
Numbers 26 and 27 (court Cottage)	II	Gastard			1 July 1986	ST8909068305; 51°24′49″N 2°09′30″W		1284439	Upload Photo	Q26573209
Outbuilding to North West of No 19 (velley Cottage)	II	B3353, Gastard			1 August 1986	ST8842068410; 51°24′53″N 2°10′04″W		1022119	Upload Photo	Q26272985
Sandpit Farmhouse	II	Gastard			1 August 1986	ST8965668484; 51°24′55″N 2°09′00″W		1364018	Upload Photo	Q26645814
Court House	II	9, Gastard			1 August 1986	ST8908568256; 51°24′48″N 2°09′30″W		1182629	Upload Photo	Q26477873
Conquest	II	11, Gastard			1 August 1986	ST8911468271; 51°24′48″N 2°09′29″W		1022022	Upload Photo	Q26272881
14 And 15, Velley Hill	II	14 and 15, B3353, Gastard			1 August 1986	ST8842468372; 51°24′51″N 2°10′04″W		1022118	Upload Photo	Q26272984
14, Gastard	II	14, Gastard			1 August 1986	ST8914568266; 51°24′48″N 2°09′27″W		1182644	Upload Photo	Q26477888
Attwood Farmhouse	II	16, Gastard			1 August 1986	ST8918468244; 51°24′47″N 2°09′25″W		1364017	Upload Photo	Q26645813
Velley House	II	18, B3353, Gastard			1 August 1986	ST8843368393; 51°24′52″N 2°10′04″W		1199210	Upload Photo	Q26495110
24 Gastard	II	24 Gastard			1 August 1986	ST8911068330; 51°24′50″N 2°09′29″W		1022023	Upload Photo	Q26272882
Barn To North Of No 23 With Wall, Gate And Summerhouse	II	Gate And Summerhouse, Pickwick			1 August 1986	ST8638370731; 51°26′07″N 2°11′50″W		1198309	Upload Photo	Q26494258
Barn at Hartham Farm	II	Hartham			1 August 1986	ST8630772250; 51°26′57″N 2°11′54″W		1022029	Upload Photo	Q26272889
Cartshed with Loft at Hartham Farm	II	Hartham			1 August 1986	ST8629972234; 51°26′56″N 2°11′55″W		1182841	Upload Photo	Q26478066
Coach House and Stables at Hartham House	II	Hartham			1 August 1986	ST8613872120; 51°26′52″N 2°12′03″W		1284381	Upload Photo	Q26573157
Garden Balustrade at Hartham House	II	Hartham			1 August 1986	ST8608971988; 51°26′48″N 2°12′06″W		1182706	Upload Photo	Q26477944
Gates, Piers And Railings Adjoining Church Lodge	II	Hartham			1 August 1986	ST8646771508; 51°26′33″N 2°11′46″W		1022024	Upload Photo	Q26272883
Gates, Piers And Railings To Hartham House	II	Hartham			1 August 1986	ST8628472111; 51°26′52″N 2°11′56″W		1022025	Upload Photo	Q26272884
Hartham Church	II	Hartham			1 August 1986	ST8642871489; 51°26′32″N 2°11′48″W		1284418	Upload Photo	Q26573190
Hartham Farmhouse	II	Hartham			1 August 1986	ST8626272233; 51°26′56″N 2°11′57″W		1284365	Upload Photo	Q26573143
Hartham House	II	Hartham			20 December 1960	ST8609872027; 51°26′49″N 2°12′05″W		1364019	Upload Photo	Q5674604
Hillsgreen Lodge	II	Hartham, SN13 0PU			1 August 1986	ST8571571427; 51°26′30″N 2°12′25″W		1199193	Upload Photo	Q26495093
Home Farmhouse	II	Hartham			1 August 1986	ST8619972212; 51°26′55″N 2°12′00″W		1363983	Upload Photo	Q26645779
Sticke Tennis Court to West of Hartham House	II*	Hartham			1 August 1986	ST8590772091; 51°26′51″N 2°12′15″W		1284355	Upload Photo	Q96404555
Stone Seat and Enclosure at South End of Long Walk at Hartham House	II	Hartham			1 August 1986	ST8598971889; 51°26′45″N 2°12′11″W		1363982	Upload Photo	Q26645778
Stone Vase at West Side of West Garden at Hartham House	II	Hartham			1 August 1986	ST8603872033; 51°26′50″N 2°12′08″W		1022026	Upload Photo	Q26272886
Summerhouse in Walled Garden of Hartham Park	II	Hartham			1 August 1986	ST8600172139; 51°26′53″N 2°12′10″W		1022027	Upload Photo	Q26272887
The Garth, Hartham House	II	Hartham			1 August 1986	ST8614972084; 51°26′51″N 2°12′03″W		1022028	Upload Photo	Q26272888
Wellhead in South Garden at Hartham House	II	Hartham			1 August 1986	ST8606072017; 51°26′49″N 2°12′07″W		1182765	Upload Photo	Q26477996
Church Lodge	II	1, Hartham			1 August 1986	ST8646071498; 51°26′32″N 2°11′46″W		1182672	Upload Photo	Q26477914
The Gate Lodge	II	2, Hartham			1 August 1986	ST8626872113; 51°26′52″N 2°11′56″W		1182697	Upload Photo	Q26477936
Alexander House	II*	High Street, SN13 0HQ			20 December 1960	ST8719870382; 51°25′56″N 2°11′08″W		1183086	Upload Photo	Q17543408
K6 Telephone Kiosk Immediately East of Town Hall	II	High Street			10 August 1995	ST8727270580; 51°26′03″N 2°11′04″W		1240081	K6 Telephone Kiosk Immediately East of Town Hall More images	Q26533019
Mayo Fountain	II	High Street			1 August 1986	ST8728970611; 51°26′04″N 2°11′03″W		1363995	Mayo Fountain More images	Q26645790
Outbuilding to East of Methuen Arms Hotel	II	High Street			1 August 1986	ST8723770225; 51°25′51″N 2°11′06″W		1022030	Outbuilding to East of Methuen Arms Hotel More images	Q26272890
Stable Range to North East of the Methuen Arms Hotel	II	High Street			1 August 1986	ST8722270247; 51°25′52″N 2°11′07″W		1182884	Upload Photo	Q26478108
The Methuen Arms Hotel	II	High Street			20 December 1960	ST8718870252; 51°25′52″N 2°11′08″W		1363984	The Methuen Arms Hotel More images	Q26645780
The Packhorse Inn	II	High Street			20 December 1960	ST8725470568; 51°26′02″N 2°11′05″W		1022051	The Packhorse Inn More images	Q26272910
The Royal Oak Inn	II	High Street			1 December 1972	ST8725470497; 51°26′00″N 2°11′05″W		1363987	The Royal Oak Inn More images	Q26645783
Town Hall	II	High Street			20 December 1960	ST8726270579; 51°26′03″N 2°11′05″W		1284062	Town Hall More images	Q26572867
1, High Street	II	1, High Street			20 December 1960	ST8716170275; 51°25′53″N 2°11′10″W		1022045	1, High Street More images	Q26272904
3 and 3a, High Street	II	3 and 3a, High Street			1 December 1972	ST8716570283; 51°25′53″N 2°11′10″W		1183062	3 and 3a, High Street More images	Q26478276
5 and 5a, High Street	II	5 and 5a, High Street			1 December 1972	ST8716670292; 51°25′53″N 2°11′10″W		1363990	5 and 5a, High Street More images	Q26645785
6, High Street	II	6, High Street			20 December 1960	ST8718670280; 51°25′53″N 2°11′09″W		1022031	6, High Street More images	Q26272891
7 and 9, High Street	II	7 and 9, High Street			1 December 1972	ST8717570303; 51°25′54″N 2°11′09″W		1183071	7 and 9, High Street More images	Q26478285
8, High Street	II	8, High Street			20 December 1960	ST8718870286; 51°25′53″N 2°11′08″W		1284320	8, High Street More images	Q26573099
11, High Street	II	11, High Street			1 December 1972	ST8717670313; 51°25′54″N 2°11′09″W		1022046	11, High Street More images	Q26272905
Lloyds Bank	II	13, High Street			20 December 1960	ST8719270346; 51°25′55″N 2°11′08″W		1284244	Upload Photo	Q26573034
15 and 17, High Street	II	15 and 17, High Street			20 December 1960	ST8719670365; 51°25′56″N 2°11′08″W		1363991	15 and 17, High Street More images	Q26645786
Barclays Bank	II	16, High Street			20 December 1960	ST8720670309; 51°25′54″N 2°11′08″W		1363985	Barclays Bank More images	Q26645781
18-22, High Street	II	18-22, High Street			1 December 1972	ST8720470326; 51°25′54″N 2°11′08″W		1182912	18-22, High Street More images	Q26478135
19 and 21, High Street	II	19 and 21, High Street, SN13 0ES			1 August 1986	ST8720170392; 51°25′57″N 2°11′08″W		1022047	19 and 21, High Street More images	Q26272906
Barnett Bros	II	24, High Street			20 December 1960	ST8720870337; 51°25′55″N 2°11′07″W		1022032	Barnett Bros More images	Q26272892
Midland Bank	II	25 and 27, High Street			1 December 1972	ST8720970422; 51°25′58″N 2°11′07″W		1284213	Midland Bank More images	Q26573007
26 and 28, High Street	II	26 and 28, High Street			20 December 1960	ST8721070344; 51°25′55″N 2°11′07″W		1182928	26 and 28, High Street More images	Q26478152
29, High Street	II	29, High Street			20 December 1960	ST8721270430; 51°25′58″N 2°11′07″W		1022048	29, High Street More images	Q26272907
30, High Street	II	30, High Street			1 August 1986	ST8721470351; 51°25′55″N 2°11′07″W		1022033	30, High Street More images	Q26272894
Corsham Parish Council Offices with Railings	II	31, High Street			20 December 1960	ST8721470441; 51°25′58″N 2°11′07″W		1363992	Corsham Parish Council Offices with Railings More images	Q26645787
32 and 34, High Street	II	32 and 34, High Street			1 August 1986	ST8721670362; 51°25′56″N 2°11′07″W		1182945	32 and 34, High Street More images	Q26478169
Porch House	II	33, High Street			20 December 1960	ST8722170475; 51°25′59″N 2°11′07″W		1183122	Porch House More images	Q26478329
35 and 37, High Street	II	35 and 37, High Street			1 December 1972	ST8722570492; 51°26′00″N 2°11′07″W		1022049	35 and 37, High Street More images	Q26272908
Gazebo to Rear of No 36 (parkside)	II*	36, High Street			20 December 1960	ST8726070356; 51°25′55″N 2°11′05″W		1182957	Upload Photo	Q17543367
Parkside	II	36, High Street			20 December 1960	ST8721770379; 51°25′56″N 2°11′07″W		1022034	Parkside More images	Q26272895
38, High Street	II	38, High Street			20 December 1960	ST8721670387; 51°25′56″N 2°11′07″W		1022035	38, High Street More images	Q26272896
The Vicarage	II	40, High Street			20 December 1960	ST8723570402; 51°25′57″N 2°11′06″W		1022036	The Vicarage More images	Q26272897
Nos 42 and 42a and Cottage to Rear of No 42	II	42 and 42a, High Street			20 December 1960	ST8723470429; 51°25′58″N 2°11′06″W		1022037	Upload Photo	Q26272898
44, High Street	II	44, High Street			20 December 1960	ST8723970445; 51°25′58″N 2°11′06″W		1022038	44, High Street More images	Q26272899
45-9, High Street	II	45-9, High Street			1 August 1986	ST8722870508; 51°26′00″N 2°11′06″W		1197950	45-9, High Street More images	Q26492389
Rowan House	II	46, High Street			20 December 1960	ST8724270458; 51°25′59″N 2°11′06″W		1022039	Rowan House More images	Q26272900
51 and 53, High Street	II	51 and 53, High Street			1 August 1986	ST8722570524; 51°26′01″N 2°11′07″W		1363993	51 and 53, High Street More images	Q26645788
52, High Street	II	52, High Street			1 August 1986	ST8725070473; 51°25′59″N 2°11′05″W		1363986	52, High Street More images	Q26645782
54, High Street	II	54, High Street			1 August 1986	ST8724970479; 51°25′59″N 2°11′05″W		1022040	54, High Street More images	Q26272901
57 and 57a, High Street	II	57 and 57a, High Street			20 December 1960	ST8724770540; 51°26′01″N 2°11′05″W		1197956	57 and 57a, High Street More images	Q26492397
59, High Street	II	59, High Street			20 December 1960	ST8725270546; 51°26′02″N 2°11′05″W		1022050	59, High Street More images	Q26272909
The Old Bank House	II	61, High Street			20 December 1960	ST8725070556; 51°26′02″N 2°11′05″W		1284057	The Old Bank House More images	Q26572863
67, High Street	II	67, High Street			1 August 1986	ST8726670595; 51°26′03″N 2°11′04″W		1363994	67, High Street More images	Q26645789
69, High Street	II	69, High Street			1 August 1986	ST8727470603; 51°26′03″N 2°11′04″W		1022052	69, High Street More images	Q26272911
69a, High Street	II	69a, High Street			1 August 1986	ST8726970598; 51°26′03″N 2°11′04″W		1198000	69a, High Street More images	Q26492446
71 and 73, High Street	II	71 and 73, High Street			1 August 1986	ST8729070629; 51°26′04″N 2°11′03″W		1198017	71 and 73, High Street More images	Q26492463
75, High Street	II	75, High Street			20 December 1960	ST8729470635; 51°26′04″N 2°11′03″W		1022053	75, High Street More images	Q26272913
Cheviot House	II	76, High Street			20 December 1960	ST8726370515; 51°26′01″N 2°11′05″W		1022041	Cheviot House More images	Q26272902
77, High Street	II	77, High Street			1 August 1986	ST8729970642; 51°26′05″N 2°11′03″W		1198022	77, High Street More images	Q26492467
78 and 78a, High Street	II	78 and 78a, High Street			20 December 1960	ST8727370528; 51°26′01″N 2°11′04″W		1022042	78 and 78a, High Street More images	Q26272903
79, High Street	II*	79, High Street			20 December 1960	ST8730270661; 51°26′05″N 2°11′03″W		1022054	79, High Street More images	Q17534055
80 and 82, High Street	II	80 and 82, High Street			20 December 1960	ST8727270541; 51°26′01″N 2°11′04″W		1183003	80 and 82, High Street More images	Q26478225
81, High Street	II	81, High Street			20 December 1960	ST8728470673; 51°26′06″N 2°11′04″W		1198039	Upload Photo	Q26492487
Corsham Post Office	II	84, High Street			20 December 1960	ST8729370567; 51°26′02″N 2°11′03″W		1363988	Corsham Post Office More images	Q26645784
Johnson's Bakery	II*	90, High Street			20 December 1960	ST8730470590; 51°26′03″N 2°11′02″W		1183008	Johnson's Bakery More images	Q17543372
92, 92a and 90a, High Street	II*	92, 92a and 90a, High Street			20 December 1960	ST8730870609; 51°26′04″N 2°11′02″W		1022043	92, 92a and 90a, High Street More images	Q17534030
94-100, High Street	II*	94-100, High Street			20 December 1960	ST8731670627; 51°26′04″N 2°11′02″W		1183013	94-100, High Street	Q17543384
102 and 104, High Street	II*	102 and 104, High Street			20 December 1960	ST8732070641; 51°26′05″N 2°11′02″W		1363989	102 and 104, High Street More images	Q17546536
106 and 108, High Street	II*	106 and 108, High Street			20 December 1960	ST8732170647; 51°26′05″N 2°11′02″W		1183036	106 and 108, High Street More images	Q17543399
110 and 112, High Street	II*	110 and 112, High Street			20 December 1960	ST8732370657; 51°26′05″N 2°11′02″W		1022044	110 and 112, High Street More images	Q17534042
Hudswell House	II	Hudswell Lane			1 August 1986	ST8561469727; 51°25′35″N 2°12′30″W		1022055	Upload Photo	Q26272914
6-10, Hudswell Lane	II	6-10, Hudswell Lane			1 August 1986	ST8548169684; 51°25′34″N 2°12′37″W		1284018	Upload Photo	Q26572826
Dovecote at Jaggards House	II	Jaggards Lane			20 December 1960	ST8541568593; 51°24′58″N 2°12′40″W		1022060	Upload Photo	Q26272918
Entrance Gatepiers to Jaggards House	II	Jaggards Lane			1 August 1986	ST8546768564; 51°24′57″N 2°12′37″W		1022057	Upload Photo	Q26272915
Jaggards House	II*	Jaggards Lane			20 December 1960	ST8542668545; 51°24′57″N 2°12′39″W		1022056	Upload Photo	Q17534067
Privy in Walled Garden to South of Jaggards House	II	Jaggards Lane			1 August 1986	ST8542468506; 51°24′55″N 2°12′40″W		1022059	Upload Photo	Q26272917
Stable Block at Jaggards House	II	Jaggards Lane			1 August 1986	ST8543368508; 51°24′55″N 2°12′39″W		1022058	Upload Photo	Q26272916
The Garden Cottage, At Jaggards House	II	Jaggards Lane			1 August 1986	ST8542068474; 51°24′54″N 2°12′40″W		1363996	Upload Photo	Q26645791
Barn Range to East of South Bank Farmhouse	II	Lacock Road			1 August 1986	ST8761270198; 51°25′50″N 2°10′46″W		1198104	Upload Photo	Q26492554
Corsham Further Education Centre	II	Lacock Road			1 August 1986	ST8723070193; 51°25′50″N 2°11′06″W		1363999	Upload Photo	Q26645794
Milestone to West of Ladbrook Lane Junction	II	Lacock Road			1 August 1986	ST8841570194; 51°25′50″N 2°10′05″W		1364000	Upload Photo	Q26645795
South Bank Farmhouse	II	Lacock Road			1 August 1986	ST8758870187; 51°25′50″N 2°10′48″W		1022064	Upload Photo	Q26272922
The Rookery	II	Lacock Road			1 August 1986	ST8739270188; 51°25′50″N 2°10′58″W		1284004	Upload Photo	Q26572813
Westrop Lodge	II	Lacock Road			1 August 1986	ST8834870238; 51°25′52″N 2°10′08″W		1284002	Upload Photo	Q26572811
Barn at Lanes End Farm	II	Lanes End, Gastard			1 August 1986	ST8865768416; 51°24′53″N 2°09′52″W		1022066	Upload Photo	Q26272925
Church of St John the Baptist	II	Lanes End, Gastard			1 August 1986	ST8846868476; 51°24′55″N 2°10′02″W		1198132	Upload Photo	Q26492585
Lanes End Farmhouse	II	Lanes End, Gastard			1 August 1986	ST8861868401; 51°24′52″N 2°09′54″W		1283981	Upload Photo	Q26572791
Stonecroft	II	Lanes End, Gastard			1 August 1986	ST8859868428; 51°24′53″N 2°09′55″W		1022065	Upload Photo	Q26272923
7 and 8, Lanes End	II	7 and 8, Lanes End, Gastard			1 August 1986	ST8873568348; 51°24′51″N 2°09′48″W		1283984	Upload Photo	Q26572794
The Plough	II	Locks Cross, Neston			15 November 1985	ST8622768086; 51°24′42″N 2°11′58″W		1022068	Upload Photo	Q26272927
1-7, Locks Cross	II	1-7, Locks Cross, Neston			1 August 1986	ST8616568117; 51°24′43″N 2°12′01″W		1198160	Upload Photo	Q26492617
Barn to South of Great Lypiatt Farmhouse	II	Lypiatt			1 July 1986	ST8690768965; 51°25′10″N 2°11′23″W		1198184	Upload Photo	Q26494141
Great Lypiatt Farmhouse	II	Lypiatt			20 December 1960	ST8690769013; 51°25′12″N 2°11′23″W		1198177	Upload Photo	Q26494136
Outbuilding to South East of Great Lypiatt Farmhouse	II	Lypiatt			1 August 1986	ST8693068995; 51°25′11″N 2°11′22″W		1363965	Upload Photo	Q26645763
Lypiatt Cottages	II	4, Lypiatt			1 August 1986	ST8676968948; 51°25′10″N 2°11′30″W		1022069	Upload Photo	Q26272928
Middlewick House	II	Middlewick			1 August 1986	ST8595171214; 51°26′23″N 2°12′13″W		1198192	Upload Photo	Q21532421
Mermaid Cottage	II	2, Middlewick			1 August 1986	ST8599371273; 51°26′25″N 2°12′10″W		1022070	Upload Photo	Q26272929
3, Middlewick	II	3, Middlewick			1 August 1986	ST8602071268; 51°26′25″N 2°12′09″W		1198209	3, Middlewick More images	Q26494163
4, Middlewick	II	4, Middlewick			1 August 1986	ST8603271236; 51°26′24″N 2°12′08″W		1363966	4, Middlewick More images	Q26645764
Beechfield House	II	Middlewick Lane, Pickwick			1 August 1986	ST8621270738; 51°26′08″N 2°11′59″W		1022071	Upload Photo	Q26272930
Gatepiers and Adjacent Walls to Beechfield House	II	Middlewick Lane, Pickwick			1 August 1986	ST8628370736; 51°26′08″N 2°11′55″W		1363967	Gatepiers and Adjacent Walls to Beechfield House More images	Q26645765
Stables to North West of Beechfield House	II	Middlewick Lane, Pickwick			1 August 1986	ST8617070750; 51°26′08″N 2°12′01″W		1283942	Upload Photo	Q26572755
Congregational Chapel	I	Monks Lane			20 December 1960	ST8765368546; 51°24′57″N 2°10′44″W		1363968	Upload Photo	Q17530069
Monks Farmhouse	II	Monks Lane			20 December 1960	ST8785068709; 51°25′02″N 2°10′34″W		1198229	Upload Photo	Q26494182
1 and 2, Monks Lane	II	1 and 2, Monks Lane			1 August 1986	ST8772368627; 51°24′59″N 2°10′41″W		1198254	Upload Photo	Q26494205
6, Monks Lane	II	6, Monks Lane			1 August 1986	ST8768668555; 51°24′57″N 2°10′42″W		1022072	Upload Photo	Q26272931
7, Monks Lane	II	7, Monks Lane			20 December 1960	ST8766668523; 51°24′56″N 2°10′43″W		1198239	Upload Photo	Q26494192
Number 8, Number 10 And Lilac Cottage	II	8 and 10, Monks Lane			1 August 1986	ST8765568148; 51°24′44″N 2°10′44″W		1022073	Upload Photo	Q26272932
Monks House	II	Monks Park			20 December 1960	ST8784668097; 51°24′42″N 2°10′34″W		1283926	Upload Photo	Q26572741
Monks House Stables	II	Monks Park			20 December 1960	ST8776168019; 51°24′40″N 2°10′39″W		1022074	Upload Photo	Q26272934
Monks Park Gardens and Walls to Walled Garden Adjoining	II	Monks Park			20 December 1960	ST8777568009; 51°24′39″N 2°10′38″W		1198281	Upload Photo	Q26494231
2 Monks Park Cottages	II	Monks Park			1 August 1986	ST8769468035; 51°24′40″N 2°10′42″W		1022075	Upload Photo	Q26272935
Barn to South of Overmoor Farmhouse	II	Moor Barton			1 August 1986	ST8594168550; 51°24′57″N 2°12′13″W		1022077	Upload Photo	Q26272937
Overmoor Farmhouse	II	Moor Barton			1 August 1986	ST8594268586; 51°24′58″N 2°12′13″W		1022076	Upload Photo	Q26272936
The Old Farmhouse	II	Moor Barton			1 August 1986	ST8591368659; 51°25′00″N 2°12′14″W		1022078	Upload Photo	Q26272938
24-28, Moor Green	II	24-28, Moor Green			1 August 1986	ST8571268708; 51°25′02″N 2°12′25″W		1022079	Upload Photo	Q26272939
Todd Monument In Churchyard About 5 Metres East North East Of Cole Monument, North Of North Aisle Of Church Of St Bartholomew	II	North Of North Aisle Of Church Of St Bartholomew, Church Square			1 August 1986	ST8742570608; 51°26′04″N 2°10′56″W		1364033	Todd Monument In Churchyard About 5 Metres East North East Of Cole Monument, North Of North Aisle Of Church Of St Bartholomew More images	Q26645829
S. Neale Monument In Church Yard About 2 Metres North East Of Reynolds Monument, North Of North West End Of Church Of St Bartholomew	II	North Of North West End Of Church Of St Bartholomew, Church Square			1 August 1986	ST8741970600; 51°26′03″N 2°10′57″W		1364032	S. Neale Monument In Church Yard About 2 Metres North East Of Reynolds Monument, North Of North West End Of Church Of St Bartholomew More images	Q26645828
6, Westrop	II	Pickwick			26 April 1988	ST8653170749; 51°26′08″N 2°11′43″W		1283424	Upload Photo	Q26572277
Milestone Set in Front Garden Wall of No 3 (meadowlands)	II	Pickwick			1 August 1986	ST8674871006; 51°26′16″N 2°11′31″W		1022081	Upload Photo	Q26272941
Outbuilding to East of Hare and Hounds	II	Pickwick			1 August 1986	ST8632170603; 51°26′03″N 2°11′53″W		1283845	Upload Photo	Q26572664
Pickwick Manor	II*	Pickwick			20 December 1960	ST8626170527; 51°26′01″N 2°11′57″W		1363977	Upload Photo	Q17546531
Privy and Garden Wall to South of Pickwick Manor	II	Pickwick			1 August 1986	ST8628870512; 51°26′00″N 2°11′55″W		1198465	Upload Photo	Q26494495
Stable/dovecote Approximately 80 Metres to South West of No 6 (pickwick House)	II	Pickwick			26 April 1988	ST8650770707; 51°26′07″N 2°11′44″W		1022126	Upload Photo	Q26272992
The Hare and Hounds	II	Pickwick			20 December 1960	ST8630570579; 51°26′03″N 2°11′54″W		1022091	The Hare and Hounds More images	Q26272957
The Masonic Hall	II	Pickwick			1 August 1986	ST8631370624; 51°26′04″N 2°11′54″W		1022085	Upload Photo	Q26272947
2a and 2b, Pickwick	II	2a and 2b, Pickwick			1 August 1986	ST8657870812; 51°26′10″N 2°11′40″W		1283889	2a and 2b, Pickwick More images	Q26572705
Meadowlands	II	3, Pickwick			1 August 1986	ST8672771010; 51°26′17″N 2°11′32″W		1022080	Upload Photo	Q26272940
Pickwick House	II	6, Pickwick			20 December 1960	ST8654870786; 51°26′09″N 2°11′42″W		1022087	Upload Photo	Q26272950
8 and 10, Pickwick	II	8 and 10, Pickwick			1 August 1986	ST8646670705; 51°26′07″N 2°11′46″W		1198380	8 and 10, Pickwick More images	Q26494313
12 and 14, Pickwick	II	12 and 14, Pickwick			20 December 1960	ST8639770661; 51°26′05″N 2°11′49″W		1363974	12 and 14, Pickwick More images	Q26645771
Mead Cottage	II	15, Pickwick			1 August 1986	ST8660570877; 51°26′12″N 2°11′39″W		1363970	Upload Photo	Q26645767
16 and 18, Pickwick	II	16 and 18, Pickwick			20 December 1960	ST8639270659; 51°26′05″N 2°11′50″W		1022088	16 and 18, Pickwick More images	Q26272952
17 and 19, Pickwick	II	17 and 19, Pickwick			1 August 1986	ST8654570829; 51°26′11″N 2°11′42″W		1022082	Upload Photo	Q26272942
Nos 20 and 22 and Low Front Boundary Wall	II	20 and 22, Pickwick			20 December 1960	ST8637370648; 51°26′05″N 2°11′51″W		1198398	Upload Photo	Q26494330
Pickwick End	II	23, Pickwick			20 December 1960	ST8639970703; 51°26′07″N 2°11′49″W		1363971	Upload Photo	Q26645768
24, Pickwick	II	24, Pickwick			20 December 1960	ST8637270620; 51°26′04″N 2°11′51″W		1363975	Upload Photo	Q26645772
25, Pickwick	II	25, Pickwick			20 December 1960	ST8637570673; 51°26′06″N 2°11′51″W		1022083	25, Pickwick More images	Q26272943
27-31, Pickwick	II	27-31, Pickwick			20 December 1960	ST8636270667; 51°26′05″N 2°11′51″W		1022084	27-31, Pickwick More images	Q26272946
The Shealing	II	28, Pickwick			20 December 1960	ST8636370626; 51°26′04″N 2°11′51″W		1198430	Upload Photo	Q26494360
30 and 32, Pickwick	II	30 and 32, Pickwick			20 December 1960	ST8635470629; 51°26′04″N 2°11′52″W		1022089	30 and 32, Pickwick More images	Q26272954
33, Pickwick	II	33, Pickwick			20 December 1960	ST8635570656; 51°26′05″N 2°11′52″W		1198312	33, Pickwick More images	Q26494261
Pickwick Stores	II	34, Pickwick			20 December 1960	ST8635070621; 51°26′04″N 2°11′52″W		1283840	Upload Photo	Q26572659
35 and 37, Pickwick	II	35 and 37, Pickwick			20 December 1960	ST8634670673; 51°26′06″N 2°11′52″W		1363972	35 and 37, Pickwick More images	Q26645769
36, Pickwick	II	36, Pickwick			20 December 1960	ST8633870613; 51°26′04″N 2°11′53″W		1363976	36, Pickwick More images	Q26645773
The Spread Eagle Public House	II	38, Pickwick			20 December 1960	ST8633670605; 51°26′03″N 2°11′53″W		1283842	The Spread Eagle Public House More images	Q26572661
40, Pickwick	II	40, Pickwick			20 December 1960	ST8632470606; 51°26′03″N 2°11′53″W		1022090	40, Pickwick More images	Q26272955
41 and 41a, Pickwick	II	41 and 41a, Pickwick			20 December 1960	ST8632070645; 51°26′05″N 2°11′53″W		1198314	41 and 41a, Pickwick More images	Q26494263
43 and 45, Pickwick	II	43 and 45, Pickwick			20 December 1960	ST8630970610; 51°26′04″N 2°11′54″W		1198321	43 and 45, Pickwick More images	Q26494269
Greystone Cottage	II	47, Pickwick			20 December 1960	ST8624870591; 51°26′03″N 2°11′57″W		1363973	Upload Photo	Q26645770
Vine Cottage	II	49, Pickwick			1 August 1986	ST8621570566; 51°26′02″N 2°11′59″W		1198356	Upload Photo	Q26494370
52, Pickwick	II	52, Pickwick			17 November 1977	ST8600170510; 51°26′00″N 2°12′10″W		1022092	52, Pickwick More images	Q26272959
Church Of St Patrick	II	54, Pickwick			1 August 1986	ST8597070489; 51°26′00″N 2°12′12″W		1283821	Upload Photo	Q26572641
Coach House to West of the Grove	II	Pickwick Road			1 August 1986	ST8712570232; 51°25′51″N 2°11′12″W		1198564	Upload Photo	Q26494590
Corsham United Reformed Church	II	Pickwick Road			20 December 1960	ST8711370319; 51°25′54″N 2°11′12″W		1283830	Upload Photo	Q26572649
Corsham War Memorial	II	Junction of Pickwick Road and Lacock Road			15 June 2017	ST8729770203; 51°25′50″N 2°11′03″W		1447301	Corsham War Memorial More images	Q66478817
Entrance Wall to the Mansion House	II	Pickwick Road			1 August 1986	ST8707970282; 51°25′53″N 2°11′14″W		1022097	Entrance Wall to the Mansion House More images	Q26272965
Stable Block And Outbuildings To South West Of The Grove Stables At The Grove	II	Pickwick Road			20 December 1960	ST8713870223; 51°25′51″N 2°11′11″W		1022095	Stable Block And Outbuildings To South West Of The Grove Stables At The Grove More images	Q26272963
The Grove	II*	Pickwick Road			20 December 1960	ST8716370233; 51°25′51″N 2°11′10″W		1198550	The Grove More images	Q17543624
The Mansion House (corsham Youth Centre)	II	Pickwick Road			20 December 1960	ST8706570260; 51°25′52″N 2°11′15″W		1022096	The Mansion House (corsham Youth Centre) More images	Q26272964
Unidentified Monument About 1 Metre South Of South Wall Of Former Corsham Congregational Chapel	II	Pickwick Road			1 August 1986	ST8711870304; 51°25′54″N 2°11′12″W		1022093	Upload Photo	Q26272960
1 and 3, Pickwick Road	II	1 and 3, Pickwick Road			20 December 1960	ST8715470269; 51°25′53″N 2°11′10″W		1363978	1 and 3, Pickwick Road More images	Q26645774
17 and 19, Pickwick Road	II	17 and 19, Pickwick Road			20 December 1960	ST8711670285; 51°25′53″N 2°11′12″W		1283809	17 and 19, Pickwick Road More images	Q26572630
Selborne House	II	64, Pickwick Road			20 August 1998	ST8670070502; 51°26′00″N 2°11′34″W		1376137	Upload Photo	Q26656787
87, Pickwick Road	II	87, Pickwick Road			1 August 1986	ST8672570522; 51°26′01″N 2°11′32″W		1022094	87, Pickwick Road More images	Q26272962
Wall, Piers And Gates To The Grove	II	Piers And Gates To The Grove, Pickwick Road			1 August 1986	ST8715870246; 51°25′52″N 2°11′10″W		1363979	Wall, Piers And Gates To The Grove More images	Q26645775
Barn to North East of Pockeredge Farmhouse	II	Pockeredge			1 August 1986	ST8586869548; 51°25′29″N 2°12′17″W		1022100	Upload Photo	Q26272968
Pockeredge Farmhouse	II	Pockeredge			1 August 1986	ST8585369537; 51°25′29″N 2°12′17″W		1022098	Upload Photo	Q26272966
Walls and Gatepiers to Pockeredge Farmhouse	II	Pockeredge			1 August 1986	ST8584969483; 51°25′27″N 2°12′18″W		1022099	Upload Photo	Q26272967
1, Post Office Lane	II	1, Post Office Lane			1 August 1986	ST8719870437; 51°25′58″N 2°11′08″W		1363980	1, Post Office Lane More images	Q26645776
Potley Lane Bridge (MLN19850)	II	Potley Lane			17 July 2012	ST8663169588; 51°25′31″N 2°11′37″W		1409196	Upload Photo	Q26676065
Former British School, Now Part Of Corsham Primary School	II	Pound Pill			1 August 1986	ST8729070038; 51°25′45″N 2°11′03″W		1198819	Upload Photo	Q26494778
Former County Primary School	II	Pound Pill			5 January 1998	ST8726970021; 51°25′45″N 2°11′04″W		1376793	Upload Photo	Q26657312
Front Wall and Piers to the Hungerford Almshouses	II	Pound Pill			1 August 1986	ST8729870186; 51°25′50″N 2°11′03″W		1022102	Front Wall and Piers to the Hungerford Almshouses More images	Q26272969
The Hungerford Almshouses	I	Pound Pill			1 August 1986	ST8732570176; 51°25′50″N 2°11′01″W		1022101	Upload Photo	Q5943339
The Parish Room	II	Pound Pill			1 August 1986	ST8730470142; 51°25′48″N 2°11′02″W		1363981	Upload Photo	Q26645777
10 and 11, Pound Pill	II	10 and 11, Pound Pill			1 August 1986	ST8740269806; 51°25′38″N 2°10′57″W		1022104	Upload Photo	Q26272971
12, Pound Pill	II	12, Pound Pill			1 August 1986	ST8739469791; 51°25′37″N 2°10′58″W		1198816	Upload Photo	Q26494775
15, Pound Pill	II	15, Pound Pill			1 August 1986	ST8735269794; 51°25′37″N 2°11′00″W		1022105	Upload Photo	Q26272973
16 and 17, Pound Pill	II	16 and 17, Pound Pill			1 August 1986	ST8736869812; 51°25′38″N 2°10′59″W		1363945	Upload Photo	Q26645745
Corsham Baptist Church	II	Priory Street			1 August 1986	ST8700870673; 51°26′06″N 2°11′18″W		1022108	Upload Photo	Q26272975
Heywood House Preparatory School The Priory	II	Priory Street			20 December 1960	ST8720270616; 51°26′04″N 2°11′08″W		1363947	Upload Photo	Q26645747
Ivy House Stables	II	Priory Street			1 August 1986	ST8725870660; 51°26′05″N 2°11′05″W		1363946	Upload Photo	Q26645746
Summerhouse and Garden Walls to Garden East of Ivy House	II	Priory Street			1 August 1986	ST8726670658; 51°26′05″N 2°11′04″W		1283661	Upload Photo	Q26572496
The Duke of Cumberland	II	Priory Street			1 August 1986	ST8706870669; 51°26′06″N 2°11′15″W		1198941	Upload Photo	Q26494448
The Old Fire Station	II	Priory Street			1 August 1986	ST8724570613; 51°26′04″N 2°11′06″W		1198895	Upload Photo	Q26494857
Spring Gardens and Barn Attached	II	1-6, Priory Street			1 August 1986	ST8708170706; 51°26′07″N 2°11′14″W		1022107	Upload Photo	Q26272974
Ivy House	II*	2, Priory Street			20 December 1960	ST8725870637; 51°26′05″N 2°11′05″W		1022106	Ivy House More images	Q17534081
Dill House	II	69, Priory Street			1 August 1986	ST8680170715; 51°26′07″N 2°11′29″W		1022109	Upload Photo	Q26272976
Osmanthus House	II	102, Priory Street			1 August 1986	ST8680970752; 51°26′08″N 2°11′28″W		1198885	Upload Photo	Q26494846
Little Lypiatt Farmhouse	II	Rough Street, Lypiatt			1 August 1986	ST8704968790; 51°25′05″N 2°11′15″W		1363950	Upload Photo	Q26645750
The Old Well House	II	Rough Street, Lypiatt			1 August 1986	ST8693468414; 51°24′53″N 2°11′21″W		1022113	Upload Photo	Q26272980
3-5, Silver Street, 3-5, B3353	II	3-5, Silver Street, Gastard			1 August 1986	ST8832268640; 51°25′00″N 2°10′10″W		1199068	Upload Photo	Q26494984
6 and 7, Silver Street	II	6 and 7, Silver Street, B3353, Gastard			1 August 1986	ST8825768651; 51°25′00″N 2°10′13″W		1363951	Upload Photo	Q26645751
K6 Telephone Kiosk	II	South Place			14 February 1989	ST8723870218; 51°25′51″N 2°11′06″W		1363956	Upload Photo	Q26533018
No 1 South Place	II	1, South Place			1 August 1986	ST8725170225; 51°25′51″N 2°11′05″W		1363997	No 1 South Place More images	Q26686948
No 2 South Place	II	2, South Place			1 August 1986	ST8725570211; 51°25′51″N 2°11′05″W		1022061	No 2 South Place More images	Q26272919
No 3 South Place	II	3, South Place			1 August 1986	ST8726370208; 51°25′51″N 2°11′05″W		1363998	No 3 South Place More images	Q26894965
No 4 South Place	II	4, South Place			1 August 1986	ST8727170218; 51°25′51″N 2°11′04″W		1022062	No 4 South Place More images	Q26272920
1, Station Road	II	1, Station Road			1 August 1986	ST8719170230; 51°25′51″N 2°11′08″W		1283540	1, Station Road More images	Q26572383
3-7, Station Road	II	3-7, Station Road			1 August 1986	ST8719270222; 51°25′51″N 2°11′08″W		1022114	Upload Photo	Q26272981
9, Station Road	II	9, Station Road			1 August 1986	ST8718670212; 51°25′51″N 2°11′09″W		1199082	9, Station Road More images	Q26494996
Barn at Mynte Farmhouse and Attached Stalls	II	The Chequers			1 August 1986	ST8894071930; 51°26′46″N 2°09′38″W		1284829	Upload Photo	Q26573568
Cartshed and Loft at Mynte Farm	II	The Chequers			1 August 1986	ST8892871909; 51°26′46″N 2°09′39″W		1021969	Upload Photo	Q26272825
Chequers Farmhouse	II	The Chequers			1 August 1986	ST8898171865; 51°26′44″N 2°09′36″W		1021970	Upload Photo	Q26272827
Mynte Farmhouse	II	The Chequers			1 August 1986	ST8895671904; 51°26′46″N 2°09′37″W		1021968	Upload Photo	Q26272824
Old Road Cottage	II	9, The Chequers			1 August 1986	ST8920371658; 51°26′38″N 2°09′24″W		1021971	Upload Photo	Q26272828
Barn and Granary at Ridge Side Farm	II	The Ridge			1 August 1986	ST8716568130; 51°24′43″N 2°11′09″W		1363949	Upload Photo	Q26645749
Barn at Pond Close Farm	II	The Ridge			1 August 1986	ST8740067833; 51°24′34″N 2°10′57″W		1199050	Upload Photo	Q26494967
Barn at Ridge Farm	II	The Ridge			1 August 1986	ST8700868146; 51°24′44″N 2°11′18″W		1022110	Upload Photo	Q26272977
Pond Close Farmhouse	II	The Ridge			1 August 1986	ST8739167817; 51°24′33″N 2°10′58″W		1022112	Upload Photo	Q26272979
Ridge Farmhouse and Walls to Front Garden	II	The Ridge			20 December 1960	ST8704468159; 51°24′44″N 2°11′16″W		1198965	Upload Photo	Q26494469
Ridge House	II	The Ridge			1 August 1986	ST8736168280; 51°24′48″N 2°10′59″W		1199004	Upload Photo	Q26494925
Ridge Side Farmhouse	II	The Ridge			1 August 1986	ST8717168169; 51°24′45″N 2°11′09″W		1198992	Upload Photo	Q26494912
Stable Range at Ridge House	II	The Ridge			1 August 1986	ST8737468268; 51°24′48″N 2°10′59″W		1022111	Upload Photo	Q26272978
Ridge Cottages	II	3-5, The Ridge			1 August 1986	ST8742768076; 51°24′42″N 2°10′56″W		1199028	Upload Photo	Q26494946
Barn to Rear of Thingley Court Farmhouse	II	Thingley North End			1 August 1986	ST8938370230; 51°25′51″N 2°09′15″W		1199102	Upload Photo	Q26495014
Coach House at Thingley Court Farm	II	Thingley North End			1 August 1986	ST8941570227; 51°25′51″N 2°09′13″W		1363952	Upload Photo	Q26645752
Thingley Court Farmhouse	II	Thingley North End			20 December 1960	ST8938970211; 51°25′51″N 2°09′14″W		1022115	Upload Photo	Q26272982
Thingley Bridge Farmhouse	II	Thingley South End			4 October 1985	ST8902269232; 51°25′19″N 2°09′33″W		1199107	Upload Photo	Q26495018
Barn at Pickwick Lodge Farm	II	Upper Pickwick			1 August 1986	ST8525471155; 51°26′21″N 2°12′49″W		1022117	Upload Photo	Q26272983
Guyers House	II	Upper Pickwick			1 August 1986	ST8571470797; 51°26′10″N 2°12′25″W		1022116	Upload Photo	Q18160343
Pickwick Lodge Farmhouse	II	Upper Pickwick			1 August 1986	ST8529971275; 51°26′25″N 2°12′46″W		1199182	Upload Photo	Q26495082
Pickwick Lodge Farm Cottages	II	62-64, Upper Pickwick			1 August 1986	ST8525371283; 51°26′25″N 2°12′49″W		1283510	Upload Photo	Q26572354
Millies House	II	Wadswick Lane, Neston			21 February 1973	ST8598168104; 51°24′42″N 2°12′11″W		1022120	Upload Photo	Q26272986
Pits Farmhouse	II	Wadswick Lane, Neston			1 August 1986	ST8610168089; 51°24′42″N 2°12′04″W		1199220	Upload Photo	Q26495119
14-18, Wadswick Lane	II	14-18, Wadswick Lane, Neston			1 August 1986	ST8592268069; 51°24′41″N 2°12′14″W		1022121	Upload Photo	Q26272987
Barn at Park Farm	II	Westrop			1 October 1970	ST8847170392; 51°25′57″N 2°10′02″W		1199238	Upload Photo	Q26495136
Park Farmhouse	II	Westrop			1 August 1986	ST8844470356; 51°25′56″N 2°10′03″W		1022122	Upload Photo	Q26272988
Summerhouse In Walled Garden Of Old House	II	Westrop			20 December 1960	ST8860870396; 51°25′57″N 2°09′55″W		1022123	Upload Photo	Q26272989
The Old House	II	Westrop			20 December 1960	ST8860970361; 51°25′56″N 2°09′55″W		1283463	Upload Photo	Q26572311
Westrop House	II	Westrop			1 August 1986	ST8855370411; 51°25′57″N 2°09′58″W		1363953	Upload Photo	Q26645753
3, Westrop	II	3, Westrop			7 September 1993	ST8854270350; 51°25′55″N 2°09′58″W		1261199	Upload Photo	Q26682099
6, Westrop	II	6, Westrop			1 August 1986	ST8860270495; 51°26′00″N 2°09′55″W		1283475	Upload Photo	Q26572322
8 and 9, Westrop	II	8 and 9, Westrop			1 August 1986	ST8859870509; 51°26′00″N 2°09′55″W		1363954	Upload Photo	Q26645754
Rose and Unicorn House	II	11, Westrop			1 August 1986	ST8867270526; 51°26′01″N 2°09′52″W		1283446	Upload Photo	Q26572296
Westwells Farmhouse	II	Westwells			1 August 1986	ST8530868952; 51°25′10″N 2°12′46″W		1022125	Upload Photo	Q26272991
17 And 19 Westwells	II	17 and 19 Westwells			1 August 1986	ST8559668965; 51°25′10″N 2°12′31″W		1022124	Upload Photo	Q26272990
42-52, Westwells	II	42-52, Westwells			1 August 1986	ST8530268932; 51°25′09″N 2°12′46″W		1199306	Upload Photo	Q26495197
62 and 64, Westwells	II	62 and 64, Westwells			1 August 1986	ST8527668918; 51°25′09″N 2°12′47″W		1363955	Upload Photo	Q26645755
Summerhouse in Garden of No 1a (cotsdale)	II	B3353			1 August 1986	ST8736670079; 51°25′46″N 2°10′59″W		1022103	Upload Photo	Q26272970
4-6, B3353	II	4-6, B3353			1 August 1986	ST8773168976; 51°25′11″N 2°10′40″W		1363963	Upload Photo	Q26645761
6 and 7, B3353	II	6 and 7, B3353			1 August 1986	ST8738669899; 51°25′41″N 2°10′58″W		1363944	Upload Photo	Q26645744
Prospect Lodge	II	7, B3353			1 August 1986	ST8740169623; 51°25′32″N 2°10′57″W		1198961	Upload Photo	Q26494465
Dunsford House	II	9, B3353			1 August 1986	ST8740569606; 51°25′31″N 2°10′57″W		1363948	Upload Photo	Q26645748
Avills Farmhouse	II	11, B3353			1 August 1986	ST8795668910; 51°25′09″N 2°10′29″W		1363964	Upload Photo	Q26645762

== See also ==
- Grade I listed buildings in Wiltshire
- Grade II* listed buildings in Wiltshire

== Sources ==
- Orbach, Julian; Pevsner, Nikolaus; Cherry, Bridget (2021), Wiltshire, The Buildings of England, New Haven and London: Yale University Press, ISBN 978-0-300-25120-3
