= Corsham Town Hall =

Municipal building in Corsham, Wiltshire, England

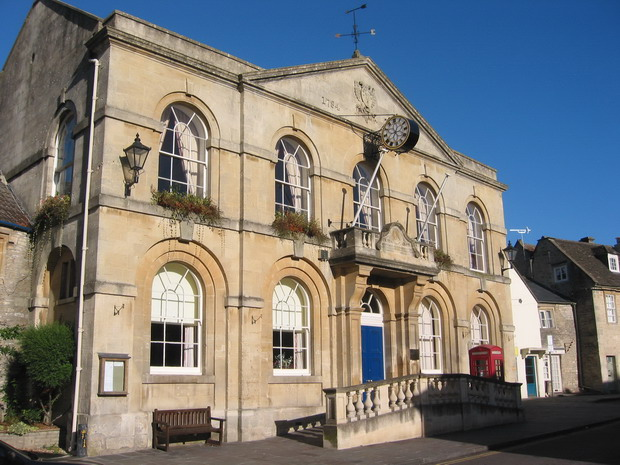
- Corsham Town Hall

- Shown in Wiltshire
- 51.4341°N 2.1846°W
- Location: High Street, Corsham

History
- Built: 1882

Site notes
- Architect: William Harris Bromley
- Architectural style: Neoclassical style

Listed Building – Grade II
- Official name: Town Hall
- Designated: 20 December 1960
- Reference no.: 1284062

Corsham Town Hall is a municipal structure in the High Street, Corsham, Wiltshire, England. The structure, which serves as the meeting place of Corsham Town Council, is a Grade II listed building.

== History ==
The building was commissioned by the lord of the manor and former member of parliament, Paul Methuen as a combined market hall and courthouse. It was designed in the neoclassical style, built in ashlar stone and was completed in 1784. The building was arcaded on the ground floor, so that markets could be held, with a small attic above. The design involved a symmetrical main frontage with five bays facing onto the High Street; the central section of three bays, which slightly projected forward, featured a pediment with the coat of arms of the Methuen family in the tympanum. The outer bays were surmounted at roof level by a cornice and a balustrade.

Civic leaders decided to increase the capacity of the building by adding an extra floor, to a design by William Harris Bromley of Corsham, in 1882. As enlarged, the central bay featured a doorway with a fanlight flanked by brackets supporting a stone balcony. The other bays on the ground floor and the bays on the first floor were fenestrated with sash windows, while, at roof level, the original central pediment, cornice and parapet were all re-used in the design of the enlarged structure. Internally, the principal rooms were the main hall and the council chamber.

Following the implementation of the Local Government Act 1894, Corsham exercised its right as a civil parish to form a town council: the first meeting took place in the town hall under the chairmanship of the member of parliament, George Fuller, in January 1895.

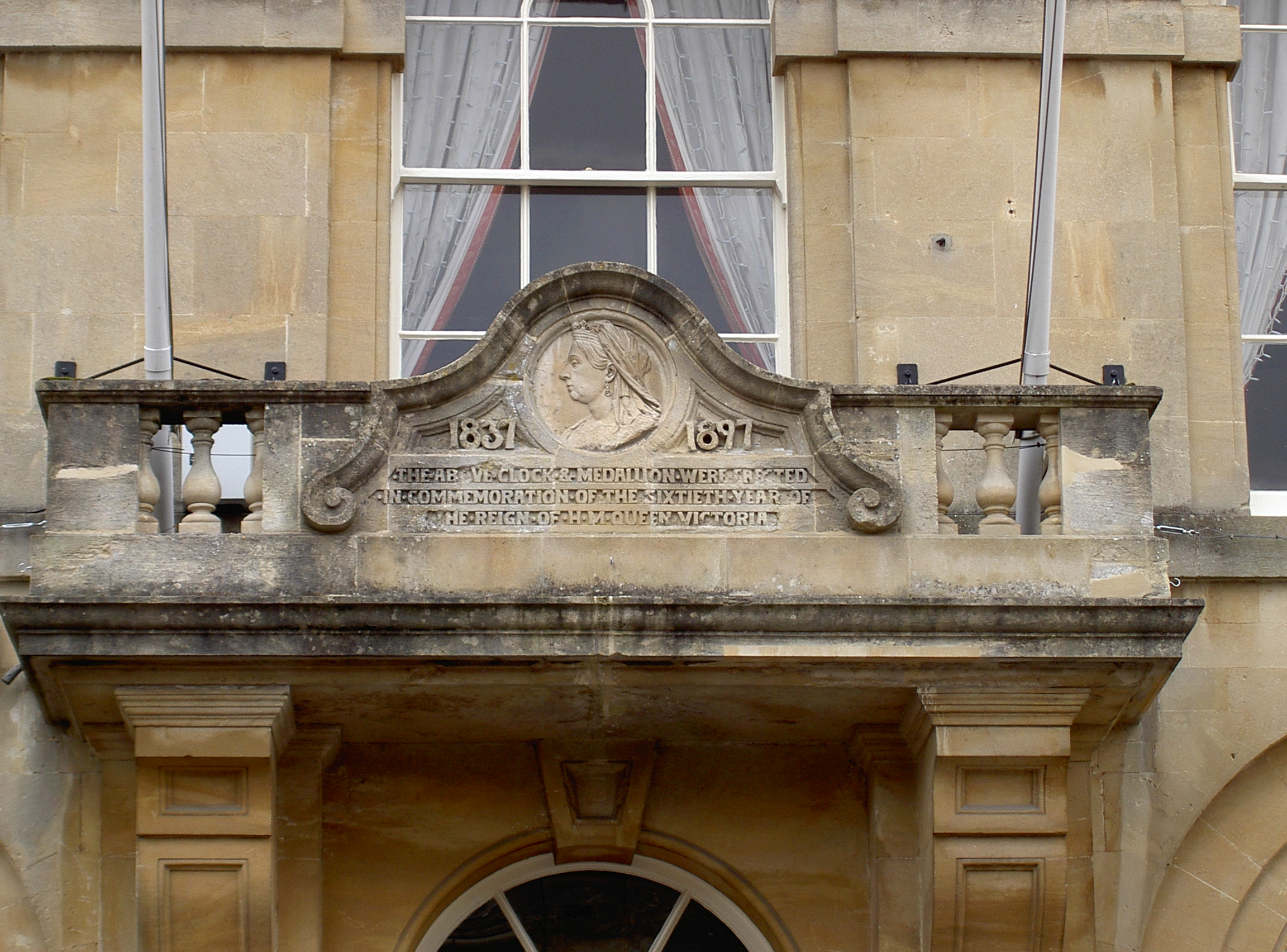
Inscription on the balcony: "The above clock & medallion were erected in commemoration of the sixtieth year of the reign of H.M. Queen Victoria".

In 1897, the balcony was enhanced by the addition of an arched stone frame containing a medallion bearing a relief portrait of Queen Victoria to commemorate her Diamond Jubilee. The council's Jubilee Committee further resolved to mark the occasion by installing a projecting clock on the town hall's frontage; this was done the following year.

At the start of the First World War, the town hall was used as a recruitment post for service personnel before they undertook basic training and were then posted to the Western Front. It went on to become a home for Belgian refugees before becoming a Voluntary Aid Detachment hospital in October 1914. It provided care for some 875 wounded service personnel during the war before closing in August 1919.

The town hall continued to serve as the main civic venue for the town throughout the 20th century and, after the new unitary authority, Wiltshire Council, was established in April 2009, it became the meeting place for the Corsham Area Board of the council. The paralympic swimmer, Stephanie Millward, who learnt to swim in the baths in the town, became the first person to be awarded the Freedom of the Town of Corsham when she received the honour at the town hall on 2 March 2013.
