= Guyers House Hotel =

Building in Corsham, Wiltshire, England

Coordinates: 51°26′9.6″N 2°12′25.6″W

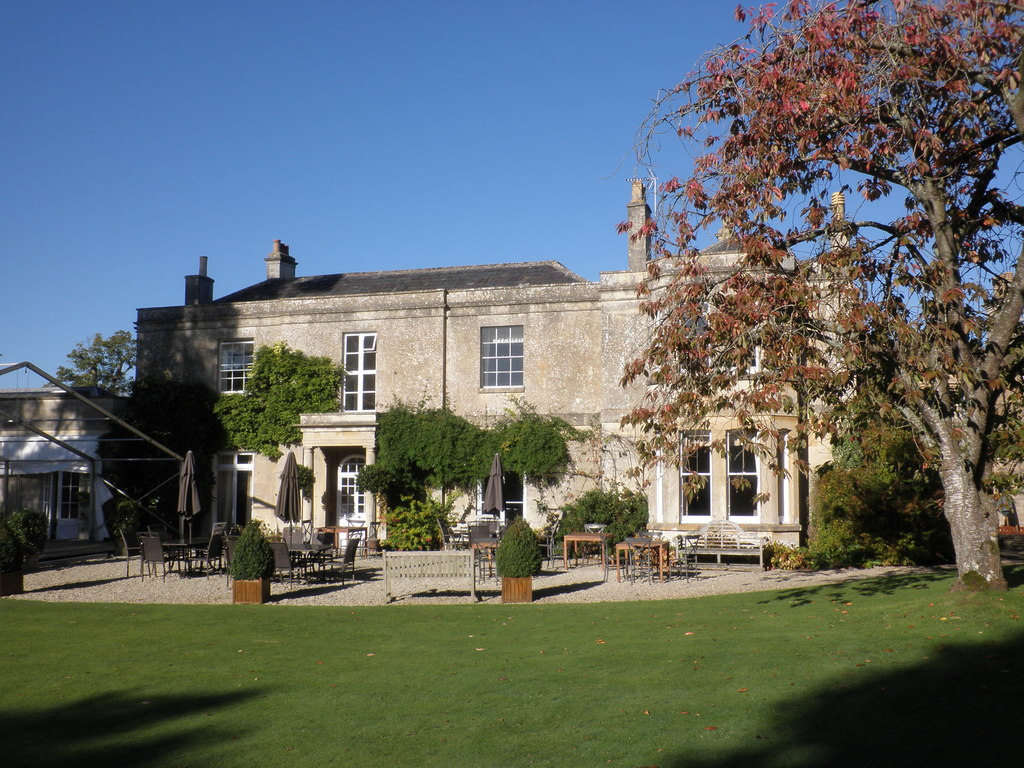
Guyers House Hotel

Guyers House near Corsham, Wiltshire is a building of historical significance and is listed on the English Heritage Register. It commenced modestly as a farmhouse in about 1670 and sections were added to it progressively through the centuries. It is now a hotel and restaurant and caters for special events, particularly weddings.

== Early residents ==
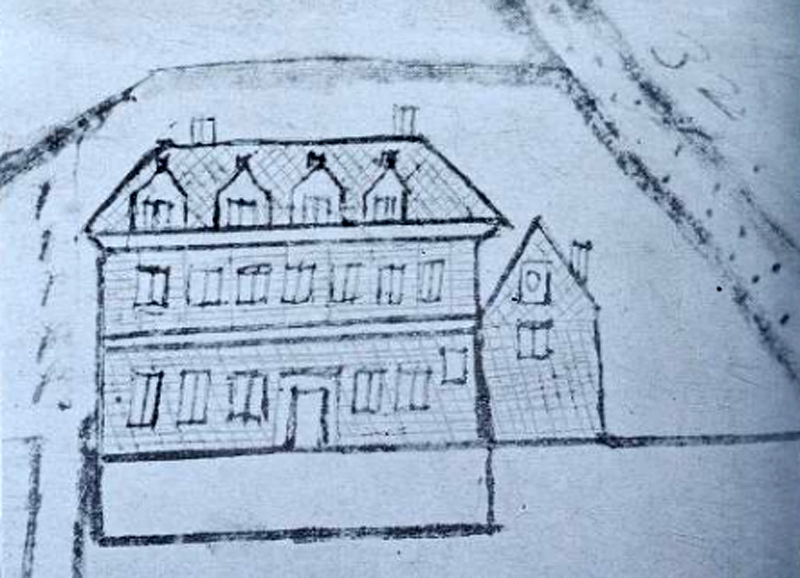
Guyers in about 1700

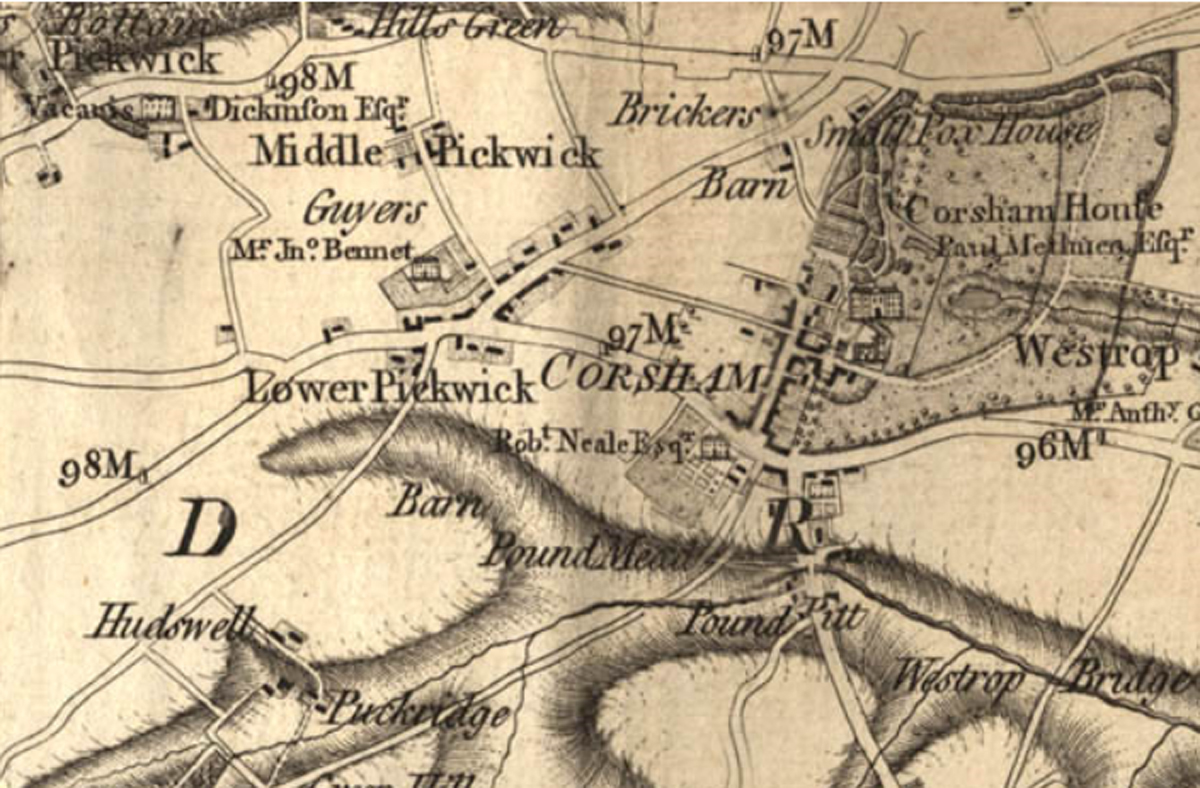
Map of 1773 showing John Bennett as the owner of Guyers

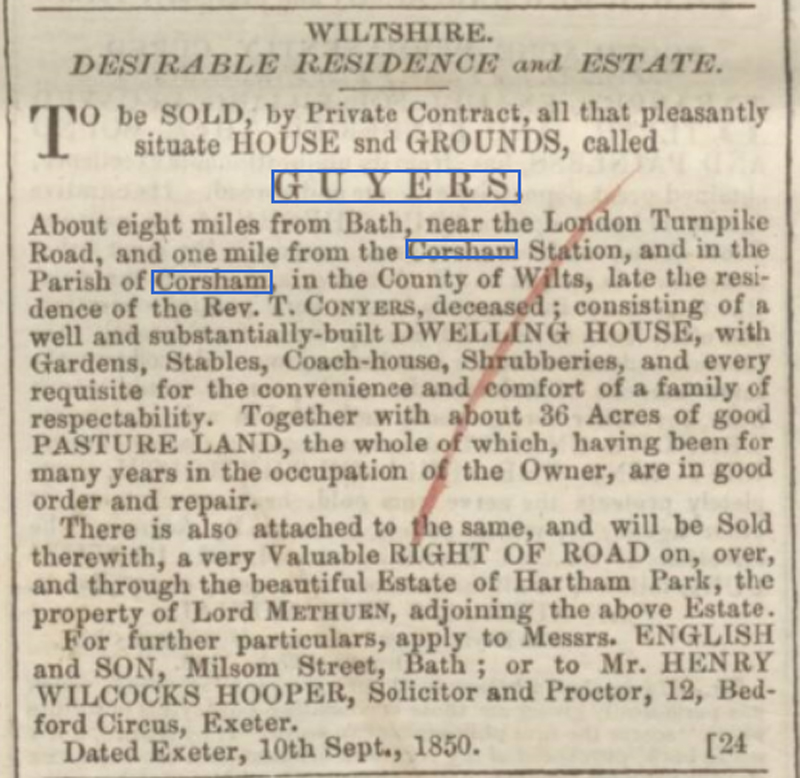
Sale notice, 1850

The first residents of the house were the Snelling family who built a small farmhouse. In 1678 they sold it to Edward Bayley who transformed it into a very substantial building. A sketch of this house is shown. Edward was a member of the Quakers who were very prominent in Pickwick at this time and he is listed in the Quaker burials. Sometime after his death in 1707 it was sold to the Bennett family. The most likely Bennett would be Thomas Bennett who opened a Quaker Boarding School in Pickwick in about 1725. After Thomas died in 1764 his son John Bennett took over teaching at the school. A map of 1773 (shown at left) shows that John Bennett owns a property called Guyers at this time. John died in 1802 and by 1813 Thomas Pycroft (1774–1849) owned the house.

Thomas Pycroft was barrister who practiced in Bath. He was born in 1774 in Essex and gained his qualifications in 1811. In 1805 he married Mary Collinson. The couple lived in Hempstead, Essex for several years then in about 1813 moved to Guyers House. They had seven children two of whom two became notable as they have entries in the Dictionary of National Biography. In about 1830 Thomas and his wife moved to Bath. He died in 1849 and is buried in St Bartholomew’s churchyard, Corsham. His tombstone is well preserved and states that he lived at one time in Guyers House. Reverend Timothy Conyers moved to Guyers House with his mother in about 1831.

Reverend Timothy Conyers was born in about 1790. After his father died his mother Susan married in 1812 Reverend Henry Brindley who was famous for his speeches against cruelty to animals. Brindley died in 1819 and Timothy Conyers went to live with his widowed mother. They moved to Guyers House in about 1830 and in 1835 his mother died. After this Timothy married Eliza Richards who was 30 years his junior and the couple remained at Guyers until 1850. When Timothy died in 1850 the house was put on the market for sale. The sale notice is shown.

Captain William Wallace Rooke (1816–1864) was the next resident and he remained there until about 1858.

== Residents after 1860 ==
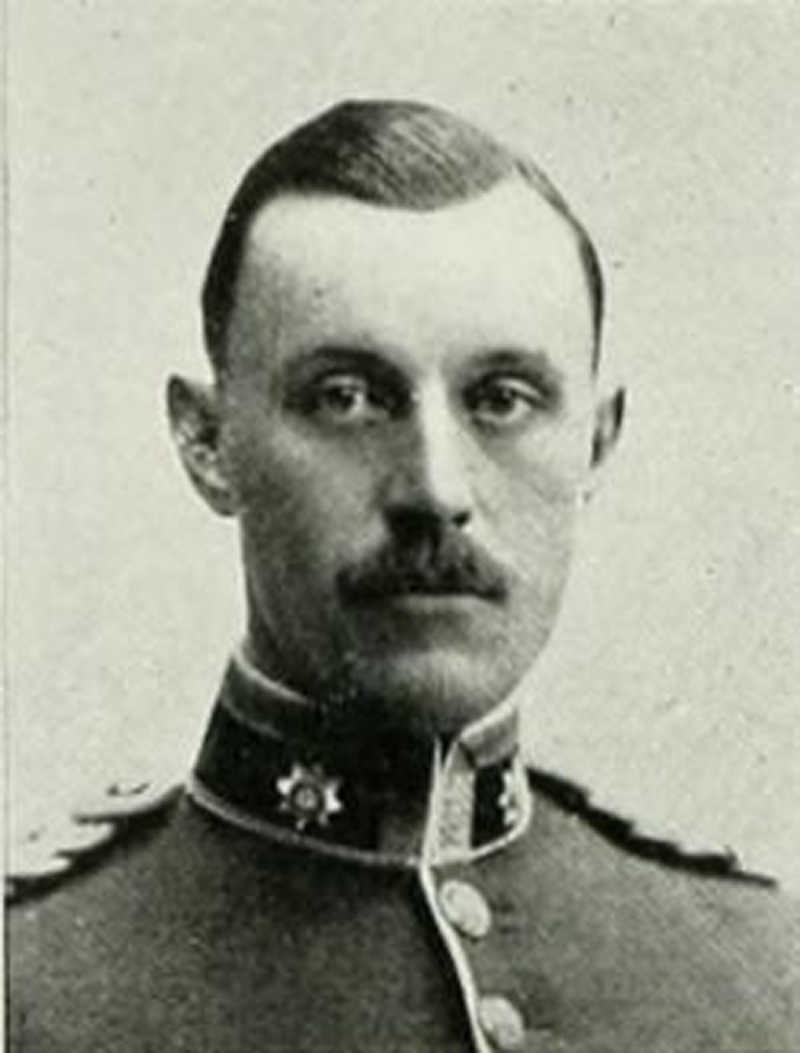
Graham Eardley Dunsterville

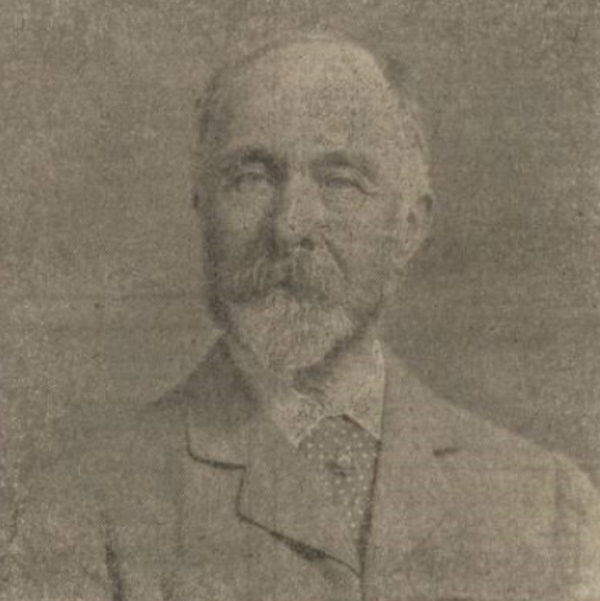
Nugent Chichester

Nugent Chichester (1828–1908) bought Guyers House in about 1860 and remained there for the next twenty years. He was born in Geneva in 1828 and was the eldest son of Mr. Joseph Chichester Nagle, and Lady Henrietta Caroline Fellowes, a daughter of the 4th Earl of Portsmouth. Nugent served in the 7th Dragoon Guards until he was about 32 and then moved to Guyer House. In 1856 he married Amelia Mary Lamb daughter of Joseph Lamb of Axwell Park, County Durham and the couple had nine children – six sons and three daughters. In 1880 Nugent inherited his father’s property Calverleigh Court at Tiverton and his family moved from Guyers.

From about 1881 until 1895, Captain Lancelot Charles Brown (1825–1895) resided with his wife Sarah Maria at Guyers House. He was the great grandson of Lancelot “Capability” Brown (1716–1783) the famous British landscape architect. After he died in 1895 Henry Stratton Coles bought the house.

Henry Stratton Coles (1864–1914) was a retired banker in Bath. In 1888 he married Edith Maude Symons daughter of Thomas George Symons of Mynde Park in Hertfordshire. They had one daughter Bridgett Stratton Coles.

In about 1910, Knightley Stalker Dunsterville bought Gurneys House. His grandson Hugh gave an account of this part of his life: he said that after Knightley bought the house his two sons who were in the Army came home on leave and stayed with their parents. It was customary for the family to go to Corsham Church and it was here that his son Graham Eadley Dunsterville met his future wife Eviline Goldney. In 1912 the couple were married and a year later had their first child. Graham went to join his regiment and Eviline came to Guyers House to live. Graham was killed soon after the war started in 1914 while trying to rescue a wounded soldier.

In 1921, there was a 'for sale' notice in the newspapers and Lieutenant Colonel Donald James Handford bought the house. He had married in 1916 Elinor D’Arcy who was the daughter of a Charles D'Arcy, a bishop in Ireland. The couple lived there for over fifty years.

== Today ==
Today, Guyers House is a hotel and restaurant.
