= Corsham Railway Cutting =

Protected area in Wiltshire, England

Coordinates: 51.42434°N 2.19987°W

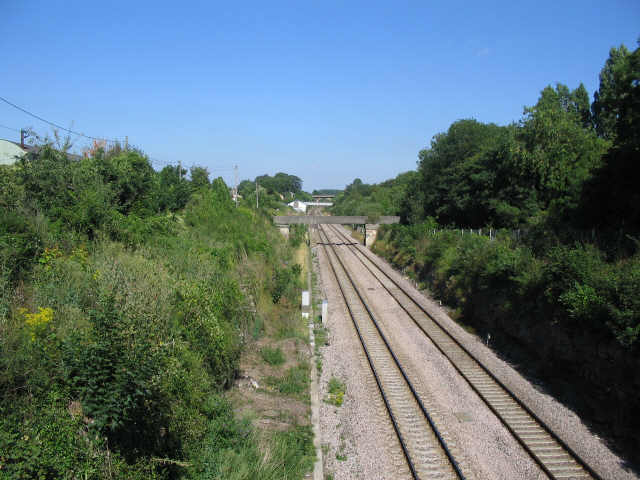
The cutting was made for the Great Western Main Line

Corsham Railway Cutting (grid reference ST862695) is a 6.6 hectare geological Site of Special Scientific Interest in Wiltshire, England, notified in 1971. The site is on the south-west edge of the town of Corsham. It provides a section through coral-bearing Jurassic limestone from the Bathonian age, and a layer of clay containing brachiopod fossils.
