= Corsham =

Town in Wiltshire, England

Coordinates: 51.434°N 2.185°W

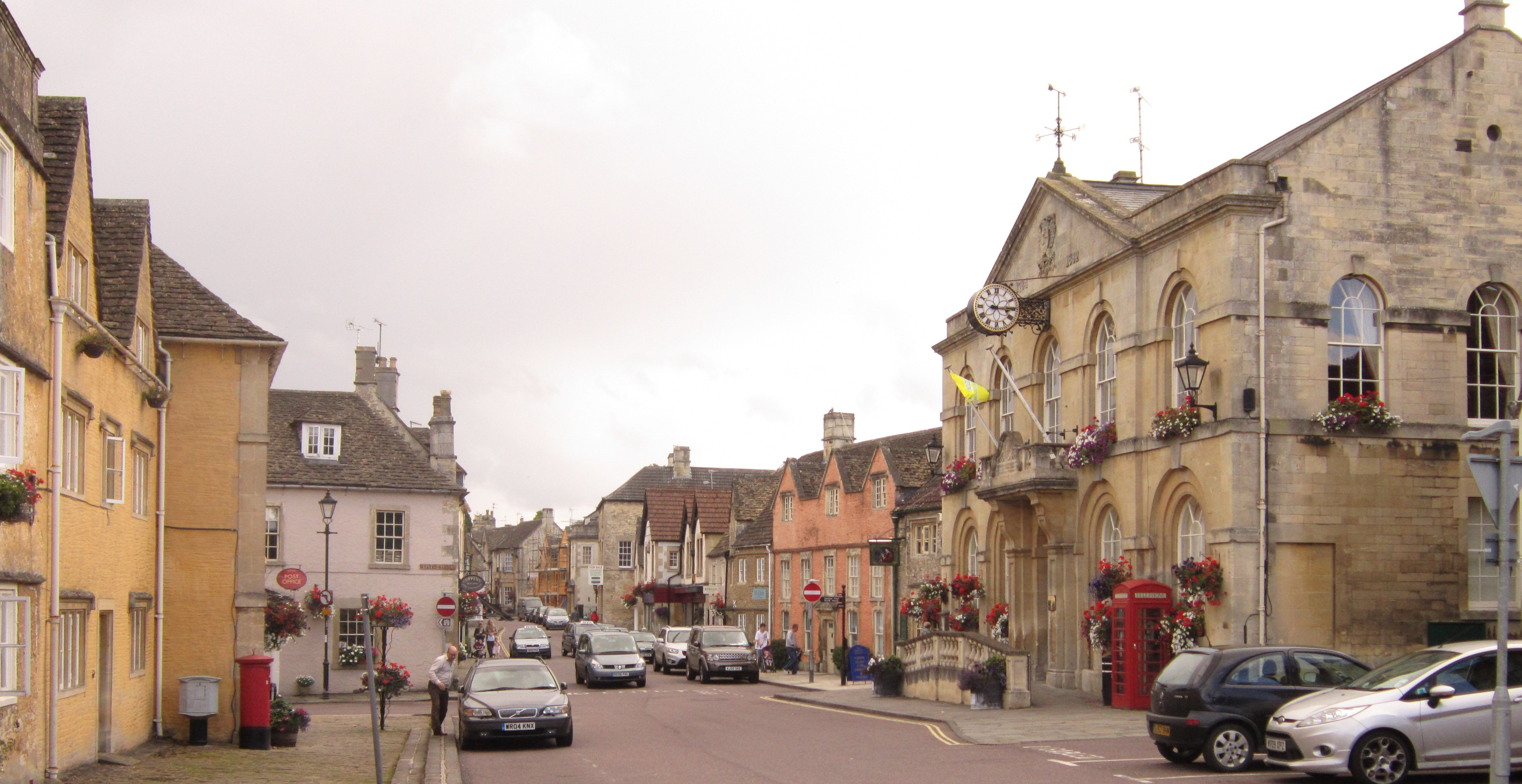
- Town Hall and Post Office at the High street

- Location within Wiltshire
- Population: 13,369 (2021 census)
- OS grid reference: ST873706
- Civil parish: Corsham
- Unitary authority: Wiltshire
- Ceremonial county: Wiltshire
- Region: South West
- Country: England
- Sovereign state: United Kingdom
- Post town: Corsham
- Postcode district: SN13
- Dialling code: 01249; 01225
- Police: Wiltshire
- Fire: Dorset and Wiltshire
- Ambulance: South Western
- UK Parliament: Chippenham
- Website: www.corsham.gov.uk

Corsham is a historic market town and civil parish in west Wiltshire, England. It is at the southwestern edge of the Cotswolds, just off the A4 national route. It is 28 miles (45 km) southwest of Swindon, 20 miles (32 km) east of Bristol, 8 miles (13 km) north-east of Bath, and 4 miles (6 km) southwest of Chippenham.

Historically, Corsham was a centre for agriculture and later, the wool industry, and remains a focus for quarrying Bath Stone. It has several notable historic buildings, including the stately home of Corsham Court. During the Second World War and the Cold War, it became a major administrative and manufacturing centre for the Ministry of Defence, with numerous establishments both above ground and in disused quarry and mine tunnels.

The parish includes the villages of Gastard and Neston, which is at the gates of the Neston Park estate.

== History ==
Corsham appears to derive its name from Cosa's hām, "ham" being Old English for homestead, or village. The town is referred in the Domesday Book as Cosseham. The letter 'R' appears to have entered the name later under Norman influence (possibly caused by the recording of local pronunciation), when the town is reported to have been in the possession of the Earl of Cornwall. The Lyons family held vast lands in Corsham from the time of the Norman Conquest in 1066 until at least the 16th century. Ingelram de Lyons, a Norman nobleman and companion of William the Conqueror, was granted these estates by William as part of the post-Conquest redistribution of land.

Corsham is recorded as Cosham as late as 1611 (on John Speed's map of Wiltshire). During the Saxon era, the Corsham area belonged to the King, and had a large forest, which was later cleared to make way for further agricultural expansion.

There is evidence that the town had been known as "Corsham Regis" due to its reputed association with Anglo-Saxon Ethelred of Wessex, and the name remains as that of a primary school.

One of the towns that prospered greatly from Wiltshire's wool trade in medieval times, it maintained its prosperity after the decline of the trade through the quarrying of Bath stone, with underground mining works extending to the south and west of Corsham. The main turnpike road (now the A4) from London to Bristol passed through the town.

Numbers 94 to 112 of the High Street are Grade II* listed buildings known as the "Flemish Weavers Houses". However, there is little cogent evidence to support that name and it appears more likely to derive from a handful of Dutch workers who arrived in the 17th century. The Grove, opposite the High Street, is a typical example of classic Georgian architecture, as is The Ivy in Priory Street. There are more than 60 listed buildings in the High Street.

== Features ==
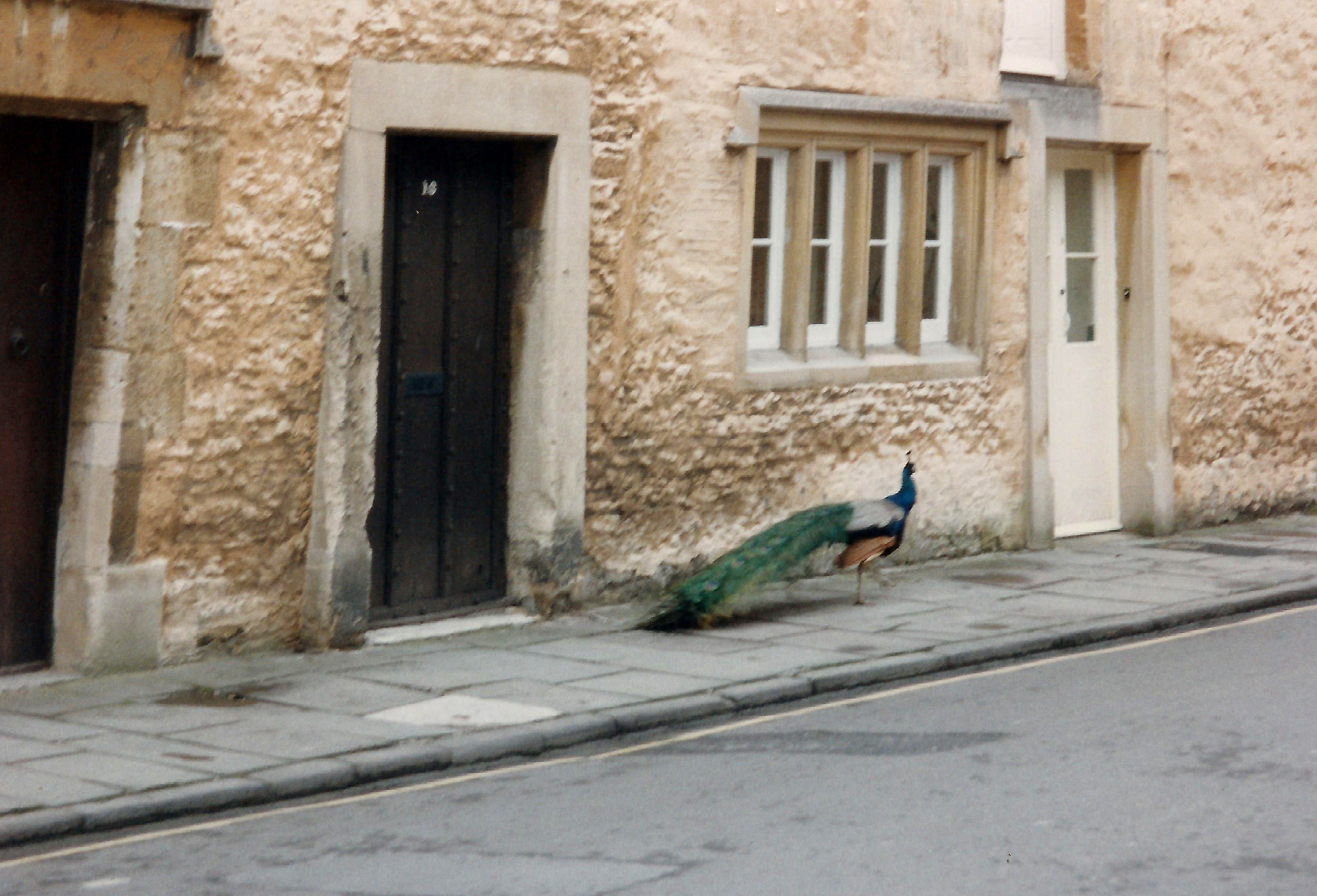
A peacock makes his way along Church Street

Corsham's small town centre includes the historic High Street and the Martingate Centre, a late 20th-century retail development.

The stately home of Corsham Court can also be found in the town centre. Standing on a former Saxon Royal Manor, it is based on an Elizabethan manor home from 1582. Since 1745, it has been part of the Methuen estate. The house has an extensive collection of Old Masters, rooms furnished by Robert Adam and Thomas Chippendale, and parks landscaped by Capability Brown and Humphry Repton. The house is open to the public all year round, excluding December, and is famed locally for its peacocks, which also wander about the streets.

Sir Edward Hungerford, the owner of Corsham Court in the mid-seventeenth century, was the commander of the Parliamentarian New Model Army in Wiltshire, and his wife, Lady Margaret Hungerford, built what came to be known as the Hungerford Almshouses in the centre of town.

== Community ==
The Pound is an arts venue and community hub for north Wiltshire, run by the Pound Arts Trust and supported by Arts Council England, Wiltshire Council, South Gloucestershire Council and Corsham Town Council. Their Rural Touring Scheme take performances to villages in Wiltshire and South Gloucestershire.

Pound Arts also organises two annual festivals: the Blue Sky Festival in June, for various art forms including music and comedy; and the Magic and Mayhem Festival in November, featuring magic, burlesque, music hall and other decadent arts.

== Parish ==
=== Gastard ===
The village of Gastard was a settlement by the 12th century. It has a 20th-century church.

=== Neston ===
Neston village was established around Neston Park, a country estate whose house was built c. 1790. Neston Park is home of the Fuller family, who give their name to the Fuller, Smith and Turner brewery in London, known for Fuller's London Pride cask ale.

=== Pickwick ===
Pickwick was once a separate settlement and now forms the north-western part of the town. The name derives from Anglo-Saxon pic (meaning a peak or pointed hill) and wic (village). The Wiltshire Hundred Roll of 1273 refers to a "William de Pikewicke".

Corsham was the inspiration for Charles Dickens' novel The Pickwick Papers; it is thought that he borrowed the name from Moses Pickwick, a coachman who was born in Pickwick, lived in the "Hare and Hounds" inn, and ran coaches between Bath and London.

=== Other settlements ===
North of the A4, besides Pickwick, are the hamlets of Middlewick, Upper Pickwick and Cross Keys.

Settlements now within Corsham's built-up area are Hudswell, Leafield, Westwells with Moor Green and Neston further south. In the east of the parish are Easton, Thingley and Westrop, and in the southeast Chapel Knapp, Gastard, Monk's Park, The Linleys and The Ridge.

== Notable buildings ==
Pickwick Manor, on the Bath Road, was noted by architectural historian Nikolaus Pevsner as an "unusually impressive example of a late 17th century manor house", having remnants of a 14th-century wing. More recently, the Grade II* listed house has been the residence of architect Harold Brakspear and his descendants.

Beechfield is a late Georgian house in Middlewick Lane, just north of the town. It was extended in the early 1970s to provide additional accommodation. The house was split into residential accommodation while part of the grounds were split off in 2002 under the auspices of the Town Council to provide a nature area where local flora and fauna can be seen. Nearby, Guyers House is a 17th-century house, now a hotel and restaurant.

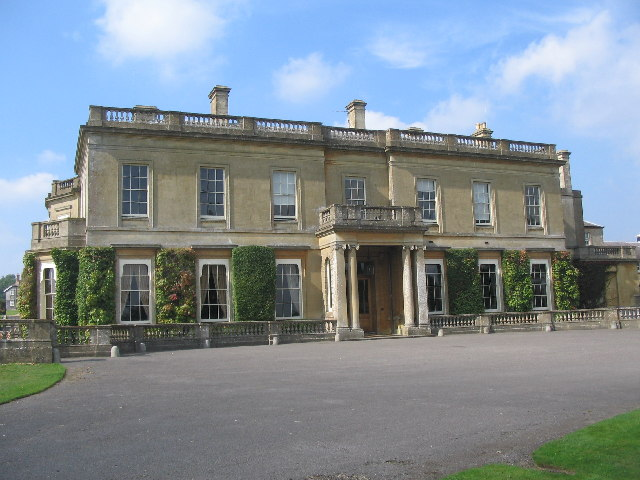
Hartham Park manor house, designed by James Wyatt

Middlewick House, just outside the town, was occupied by Camilla Parker Bowles (later Queen Camilla) and her first husband between 1986 and 1995, when it was bought by Nick Mason of Pink Floyd. Further to the north, Hartham Park is a Georgian estate that includes a rare stické court. Rudloe Manor, a 17th-century Grade II* listed manor house, is off the Bath Road west of the town, just outside Corsham parish.

== Governance ==
For Westminster elections, Corsham is within the Chippenham constituency, which has been represented since the 2024 general election by Sarah Gibson for the Liberal Democrats.

When the Local Government Act 1972 came into force on 1 January 1974, Corsham came within the areas of Wiltshire County Council and North Wiltshire District Council, electing one county councillor and three district councillors from the Corsham and Lacock division. On 1 April 2009, Wiltshire became a unitary authority managed by Wiltshire Council and the county's district councils were all merged into this body. From 2009, voters in the area elect three councillors to the unitary authority, one from each of three single-member electoral divisions: Corsham Ladbrook, Corsham Pickwick, and Corsham Without (which extends to neighbouring Lacock, part of Box, and the rural area south and east of the town).

Corsham's first tier of government is Corsham Town Council, which was created as a parish council in 1895. Although Corsham never had its own town charter, in 2000 it became a town council. There are currently twenty councillors.

== Population and demography ==
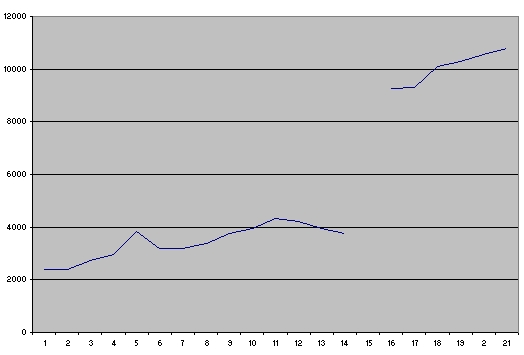
Changes in Corsham's population 1801–2001

The first official census of 1801 showed Corsham having 2,402 inhabitants, while that of 2011 recorded exactly 13,000. The increase shown for 1840 is due to the influx of stone workers and the arrival of the Great Western Railway. No census was taken in 1941 due to the Second World War, but the jump in population (from 3,754 in 1931 to 9,268 in 1951, an increase of 147%) is attributable to the influx of military personnel.

The 2001 census demographics of the SN13 postcode area, of which Corsham comprises the major part, did not differ markedly from national figures; the unemployment rate was 2.0 per cent compared to a national 3.2 per cent, and there was a marginally higher rate of retirees (at 23.3 per cent as against 22 per cent). 23 per cent of adults are educated to degree level, against a national average of 20 per cent.

== Education ==
Corsham has four primary schools, an independent preparatory school and a large secondary school. The primary schools, catering for students up to age 11, are:

- Corsham Primary School, split between Pound Pill and Broadwood Avenue, was formed from Lady Methuen's School for Girls (founded 1816), the National School for Girls (c.1840s) and Corsham British School for Boys (c.1840). These schools came under the aegis of the Corsham School Board in 1893 and were finally merged in 1923. It now provides for about 680 pupils.
- Corsham Regis Primary Academy, Kings Avenue, opened in 1943 for the children of incoming military workers. It became a junior school in 1955 when older children transferred to the Corsham Secondary Modern School, and now has about 150 pupils.
- Neston Primary School, Church Rise, Neston, was founded in 1861 as Corshamside School. It now provides for about 200 pupils.
- St Patrick's Catholic Primary School, Lacock Road, opened in 1966 and is a voluntary aided school with about 190 pupils.

Two schools outside the parish take pupils from Corsham: Box CE (VC) Primary School and Shaw CE Primary School.

The Corsham School, The Tynings, is Corsham's only secondary school; it was opened in 1972 as a comprehensive and is now a large academy with a sixth form. In July 2024 the school had 1,264 pupils.

Heywood Prep School, Priory Street, is an independent school providing education from ages 2 to 11, and has about 260 pupils. It is located on two acres of property in the centre of Corsham, near Corsham Court, on a site first mentioned in the Domesday Book as a priory donated to an order of monks. The Grade II Georgian building in Bath stone is from 1776; later additions include a barn, used as a dining room and later a science block, and a multi-functional performance hall. The school is part of the Wishford Schools group.

A school was first endowed in Corsham by Lady Margaret Hungerford, in 1668 as part of the almshouses. A new schoolroom was built on the south side of Lacock Road by lord of the manor, Paul Cobb Methuen in 1816. The building, which is Grade II listed, is still standing and is used as a further education centre by Wiltshire College.

== Churches ==
=== Former priory ===
Corsham Priory was referred to in 1336 as having been given to Marmoutier Abbey during the time of Henry I (1068–1135) as an alien priory. An unnamed prior was referred to in 1201, but the priory had become inactive by 1294 and its lands passed to The Crown and eventually to King's College, Cambridge. Later a Georgian house was built on the site, which is now part of Heywood Prep School.

=== Anglican churches ===
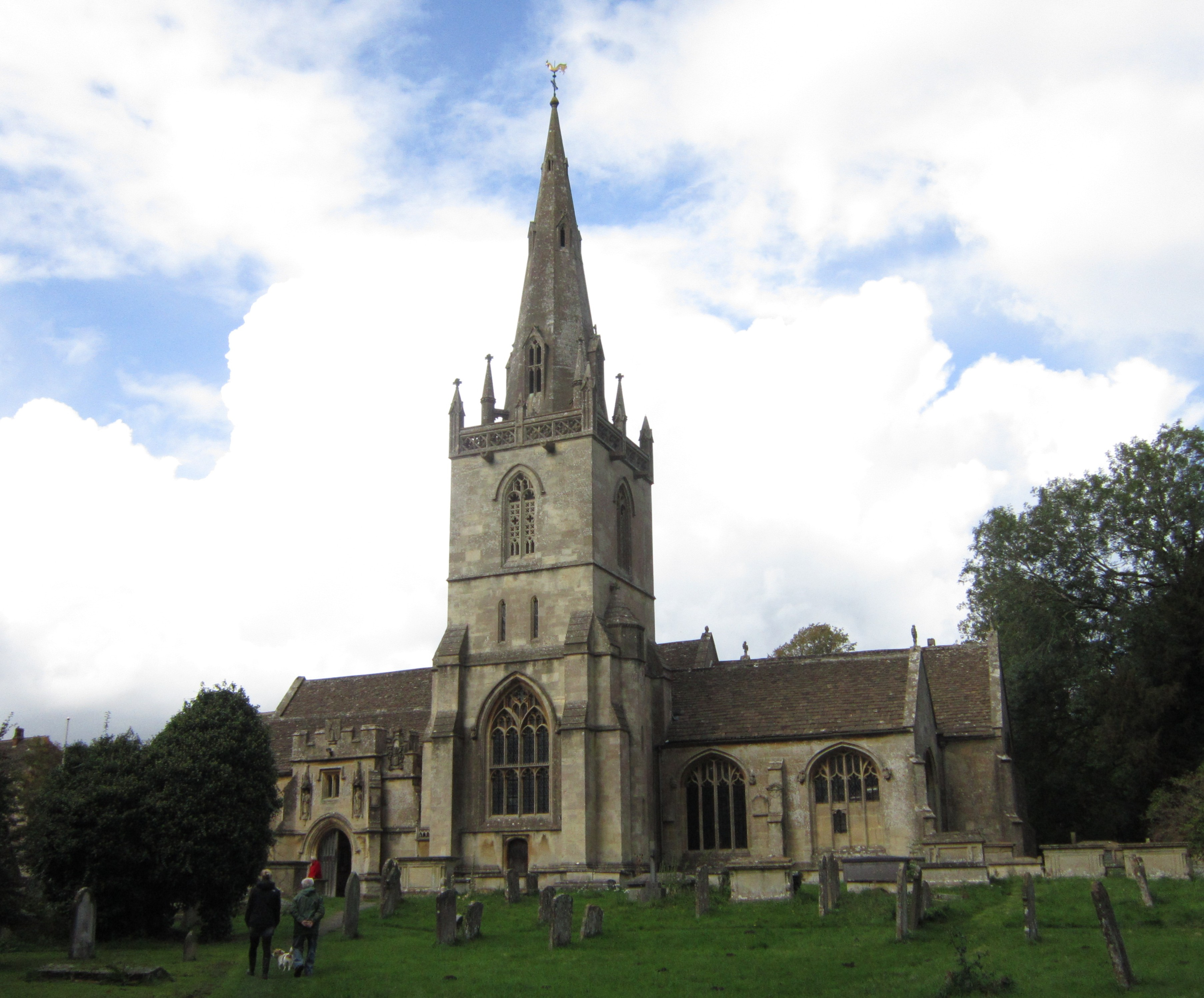
Church of St Bartholomew

The town of Corsham and surrounding villages are within the jurisdiction of the Diocese of Bristol. The churches are served by the Corsham & Lacock Churches team ministry, which extends east to St Cyriac's, Lacock and St Anne's, Bowden Hill.

==== Church of St Bartholomew ====
The main parish Church of St Bartholomew, which stands between the High Street and Corsham Court, is partly built on Saxon foundations. The present church has 12th-century origins but underwent major Victorian restoration in 1875–1878 by G.E. Street.

Pevsner writes: "A large church with a commanding S tower with spire. It looks as if it were all built for the great house and the estate in the days of Victorian prosperity. In fact Street only restored an old church, but he did it unfortunately thoroughly, and he added the tower."

Street's tower replaced an earlier central tower. Around the same time the chancel was restored by C.F. Hansom, who also added a north chapel for the Methuen family. The north aisle remains from the early 14th century, and the south aisle from later in that century; the nave has Norman arcades and a 15th-century roof. In 1960 the church was designated as Grade I listed.

In the north chancel chapel, the large altar tomb of 15th-century landowner Thomas Tropenell is shared with his first wife, Agnes.

==== Outlying churches ====
The Church of St Philip and St James at Neston was opened in 1866. Its architecture is early English, in local stone to designs of J.H. Hakewill. Internal re-ordering was completed in 1985.

The Church of St. John the Baptist at Gastard was built in 1912 in the gothic style.

=== Roman Catholic ===
St. Patrick's Roman Catholic Church was opened in 1945, replacing temporary centres which had been arranged for the wartime population influx. The building is the former Pickwick school, opened in 1858 on land gifted in 1846 by Lord Methuen and his tenants, Sir Gabriel Goldney and Arthur Knapp; the architect was Henry Goodridge of Bath. The school closed in 1922 and the building was used for a time as a glove factory, then as a gas mask factory.

=== Monk's Chapel ===
Monk's Chapel, built near Gastard in 1662, was formerly a Quaker meeting-house and was transferred to the Congregational church in 1690. The chapel is a Grade I listed building and continues in use as of 2016.

=== Other free churches ===
The Baptist Chapel, Moor Green, was founded in 1833. Ebenezer Baptist Chapel, Velly, was founded in 1857.

The Congregational Church, Pickwick Road, originally met in a malthouse, and a new building was commenced in 1790. In 1971 it closed and is now used as offices.

Ebenezer Chapel, Priory Street, was formed in 1822/3 when some members of the Congregational Church split over doctrine. The present building opened in 1829 and has been extended since then. As of 2016, the building is still in use, as Corsham Baptist Church. Zion Hill Baptist Chapel was built in 1859 by a group who separated from the Priory Street chapel.

The Particular Baptist Chapel, Pound Pill, dates back to about 1824. The Brethren met in several locations, beginning in the mid nineteenth century at Pockeridge Lodge, moving to Neston, while another group met in Pickwick. By 1903, both were meeting in Neston and in 1925 they bought the Primitive Methodist Chapel, Station Road.

A large Wesleyan Methodist chapel was built on Pickwick Road in 1903. In 1984 the congregation was joined by the nearby Congregational church (which by then was part of the United Reformed Church) to form the United Church of St Aldhelm. In 2016 the church continues in use.

== Transport ==
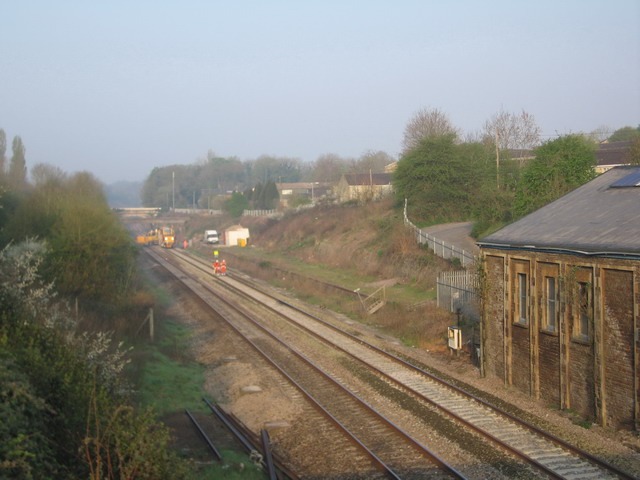
There is a local campaign to reopen the railway station near Station Road

Corsham is connected to Bradford on Avon by the B3109 road, to Melksham by the B3353, and to Chippenham and Bath by the A4 Bath Road, a former turnpike from London to Bristol. Junction 17 of the M4 motorway is about 8 miles (12 km) from Corsham. Bus company Faresaver operate local services, as well as buses to nearby towns (including the twice-per-hour X31 between Bath and Chippenham).

The Great Western Main Line railway from London to Bristol, Exeter and Penzance passes through the town, though Corsham station closed in 1965. Proposals to reopen the station have been put forward since at least 2009, and, in 2021, a feasibility study was approved by the Department for Transport.

Nearby stations, and most passenger trains, are operated by Great Western Railway. Some local services call at the nearest station at Melksham, 4.5 miles (7.2 km) away, but Chippenham station, 4.7 miles (7.6 km) away, offers frequent express services and connections.

The eastern portal of Box Tunnel, the longest railway tunnel of its time, built by Isambard Kingdom Brunel for the Great Western Railway, is at Hudswell on the western edge of the town. Corsham Railway Cutting carries the main line westward through Corsham to Box Tunnel. In 1971, 6.6 hectares (16 acres) of land in the cutting were designated a Site of Special Scientific Interest for its notable geology.

== Town twinning ==
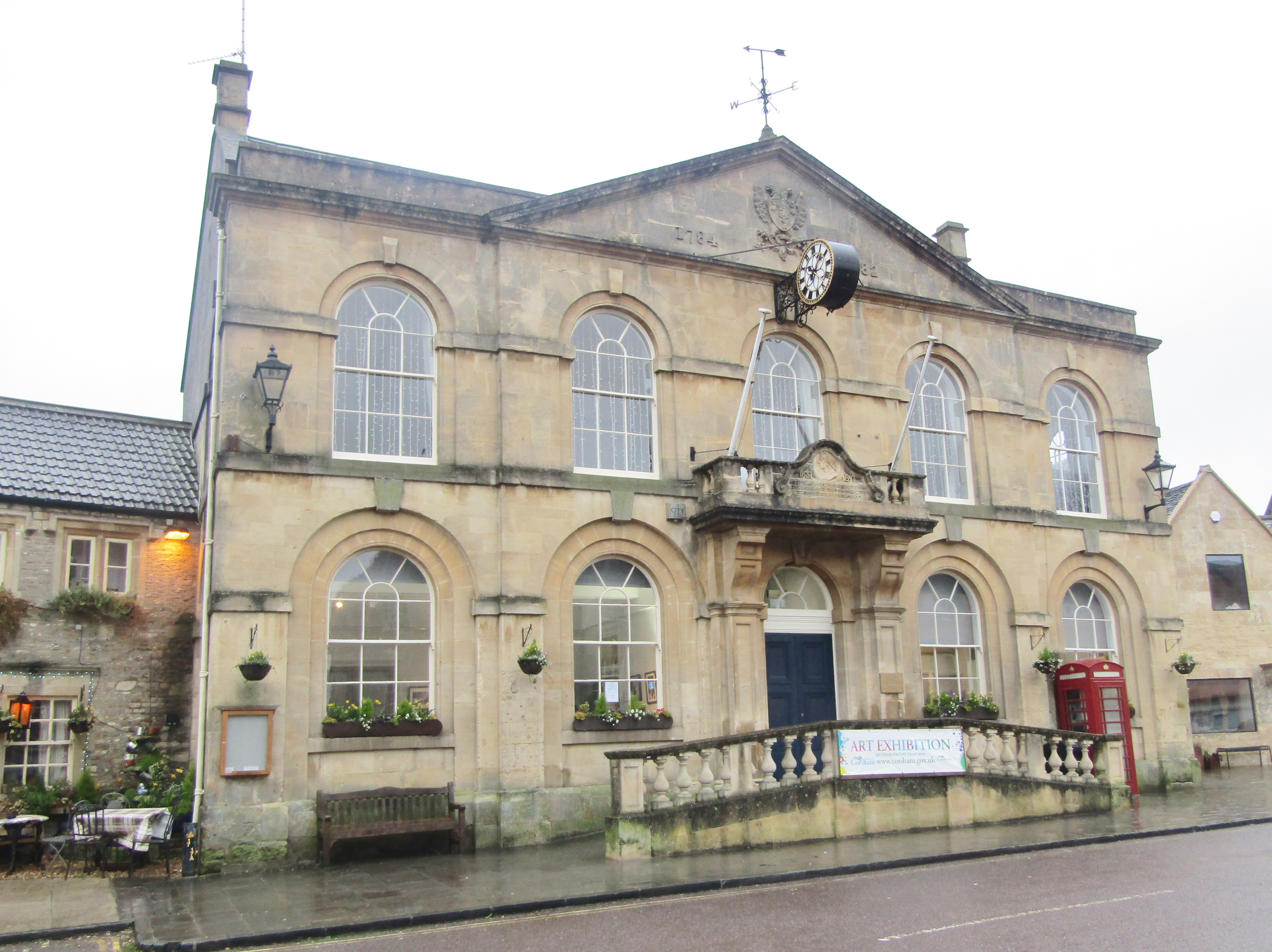
Corsham Town Hall

Corsham has had a twinning relationship with the town of Jargeau, France since 1981, and has an active twinning association. Corsham holds an annual twinning event in which musical and charity events occur, accompanied by French food and wines. There is also a boules competition for the Peter Henderson trophy which is named in memory of a local doctor and former chairman of the twinning association. As part of the 2008 event, a mock Storming of the Bastille was staged to celebrate Bastille Day, Corsham Town Hall standing in for the Parisian prison.

== Economy ==
=== Defence ===
The Ministry of Defence has operated a number of locations in the vicinity of Corsham since the First World War and employs approximately 2,000 people. Several defence sites in the Corsham area are located underground and were formed from historic Bath Stone quarries. The largest of the above-ground sites are centred around the Hawthorn area of Corsham.

==== Basil Hill site ====
The Basil Hill site is in Westwells Road and comprises the former Basil Hill Barracks; the site is now designated MOD Corsham and accommodates approximately 2,100 people. It is home to UK Strategic Command's Defence Digital organisation and also houses the Ministry of Defence's Global Operations Security Control Centre, amongst other units.

==== Rudloe site ====
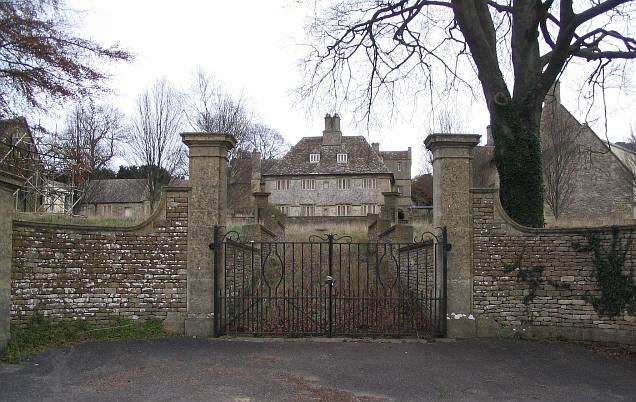
The manor house of RAF Rudloe Manor

The Rudloe site, bordering Westwells Road and Bradford Road, was one of three sites that comprised RAF Rudloe Manor. Rudloe Manor was established during the Second World War as a non-flying station for administrative and command & control purposes. It was home to HQ Number 10 Fighter Group, RAF Regional Command, Headquarters RAF Police & Security Services, No 1 Signals Unit, Controller Defence Communications Network and 1001 Signals Unit. The main site also served as the primary entrance for the Central Government War Headquarters, variously known as "Turnstile", "Stockwell", "Subterfuge" and "Burlington".

By 1998 it had become mostly administrative, housing the RAF Provost and Security Services, which dealt with security and criminal investigation. The sites were taken over by the Defence Communication Services Agency in about 2000, while the detachment of 1001 Signals Unit of the RAF remained at the Hawthorn site until its privatisation. RAF Rudloe Manor was then absorbed into Joint Support Unit Corsham.

==== Hawthorn site ====
Hawthorn site, on Skynet Drive, previously accommodated the RAF 1001 Signal Unit detachment of RAF Rudloe Manor. The site supports the Skynet military communications satellite constellations, which is now managed by Astrium Services under a PFI arrangement.

==== Copenacre site ====
The Copenacre site, off the A4 Bath Road about 1 mile (1.6 km) west of Corsham, was originally an underground stone quarry below land formerly part of the Hartham estate; this was taken over by the Ministry of Defence in 1937 and became the Royal Naval Stores Depot, Copenacre. The underground stores closed on 30 September 1995. The site closed completely in January 2011 and was sold. In 2016 demolition started to redevelop the brownfield site into housing. Two original mine structures remain incorporated into the development, one being a shaft entrance.

==== Other units ====
The Joint Support Unit provides administrative support and facilities management for all three locations. In 2006 a Private Finance Initiative contract was let to Inteq for the renewal and expansion of the Basil Hill and Rudloe Site facilities, valued at around £800m.

Corsham Computer Centre is a Royal Navy data processing facility.

The Services Cotswold Centre in Neston is a welfare centre offering temporary accommodation for services families who require it. The centre has 63 family units, a medical centre and other amenities.

HMS Royal Arthur was a training establishment between 1947 and 1993.

A number of defence-related contractors are co-located or in the vicinity of the MoD sites, such as Chemring Energetics UK Limited and Serco Defence, Science and Technology.

=== Quarries ===
Underground extraction of Bath Stone continues in Corsham on a smaller scale than previously. Hanson plc operates Hartham Park Quarry in the Hudswell district, south-west of Pickwick, and Monk's Park Quarry near Gastard.

Disused quarries have been redeployed for other purposes; apart from defence usage, there is a wine storage facility at Eastlays, near Gastard run by Octavian Vaults, and storage of magnetic media for off-site data protection at Neston.

=== Film and television ===
Another use for the quarries is the film industry. Underground scenes from the first episode of Blake's 7 were filmed at Eastlays, and disused tunnels form part of the studio complex of Corsham Media Park, a specialist business park that opened in 2001 adjacent to RAF Rudloe Manor.

Period drama location filming occurs in Corsham, as in neighbouring Lacock and Atworth parishes. Neston Park hosted major outdoor film sets for the 2008 BBC television adaption of Lark Rise to Candleford, and the BBC also filmed scenes for a 2008 version of Tess of the D'Urbervilles in Church Street and Corsham Court grounds.

Corsham Court has also been used as a period location in productions such as Barry Lyndon (1975), The Remains of the Day (1993), A Respectable Trade (1997) and Wives and Daughters (1999).

In 2014, scenes for the new adaptation of Poldark were filmed in the town's High Street, meaning Corsham then featured in every series until the drama ended in 2019.

== Media ==
Local news and television programmes are provided by BBC West and ITV West Country. Television signals is received from the Mendip and local relay transmitters.

Local radio stations are BBC Radio Wiltshire on 104.3 FM, Heart West on 102.2 FM, and Greatest Hits Radio South West on 107.5 FM.

The local newspapers are the Gazette and Herald and Wiltshire Times.

== Sport ==
Corsham has a non-League football club Corsham Town F.C., founded in 1884, who play at Southbank. They finished first in the Western Football League Premier Division in 2007.

Corsham RFC play at their Laycock Road ground, next door to the football club. Their 1st XV compete in Counties 1 Southern South, Tribute Dorset & Wilts Central, the Dorset & Wilts Cup and the Bath Combination Cup.

== Notable people ==
- Decca Aitkenhead (b. 1971), journalist, columnist for The Guardian
- Felix Aylmer (1889–1979), actor, President of Equity 1950–1969
- Edwin Bezar (1838–1936), soldier, one of the last surviving veterans of the Crimean War and the New Zealand Wars
- Jennifer Biddall (b. 1980), actress, best known as Jessica Harris in Hollyoaks
- Queen Camilla (b. 1947) and her first husband Andrew Parker Bowles, lived at Middlewick House
- Harold Brakspear (1870–1934), restoration architect and archaeologist, lived at Pickwick Manor and Parkside in High Street
- Revd Richard Enraght (1837–1898), religious controversialist, curate of St Bartholomew's Church, Corsham, 1861–1864
- Sir Gabriel Goldney, 1st Baronet of Beechfield (1813–1900), MP for Chippenham, and the later Goldney baronets
- Edward Hasted (1732–1812), historian, master of Corsham Almshouse
- Elizabeth Hurley (b. 1965), actress, attended St Patrick's Primary School 1973–74
- Kris Marshall (b. 1973), actor, best known for playing Nick Harper in My Family and lead detective DI Humphrey Goodman in Death In Paradise and Beyond Paradise
- Nick Mason (b. 1944), musician, Pink Floyd, lives at Middlewick House
- Baron Methuen, family seat is Corsham Court
- Gavin Schmidt, climatologist, GISS
- Jim Smith (1906–1979), England Test cricketer, brother of the below
- William Smith (1900–1990), cricketer, brother of the above
- Rini Templeton (1935–1986), artist, studied at Bath Academy in Corsham c. 1956
- Michael Tippett (1905–1998), composer, lived at Parkside in High Street, 1960–70

== Gallery ==
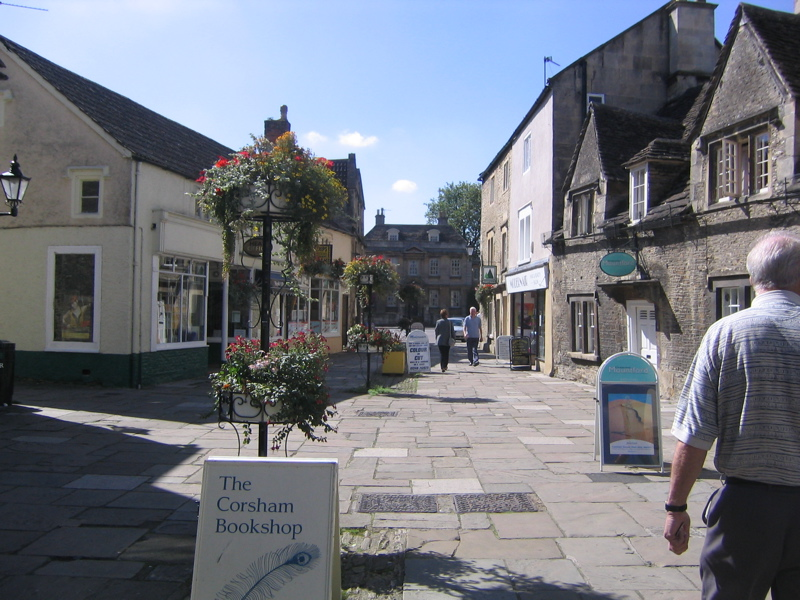
The historic High Street is typical of a Cotswold town

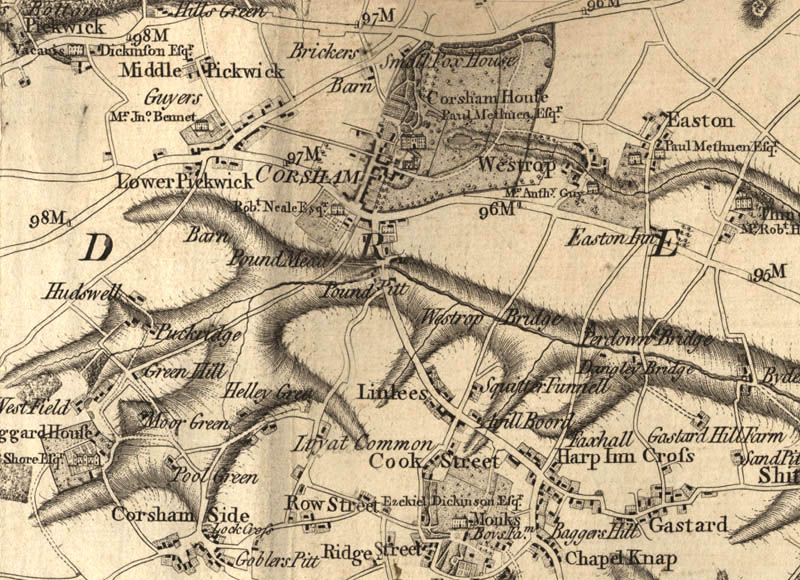
A 1773 map shows Neston's earlier name of Corsham Side

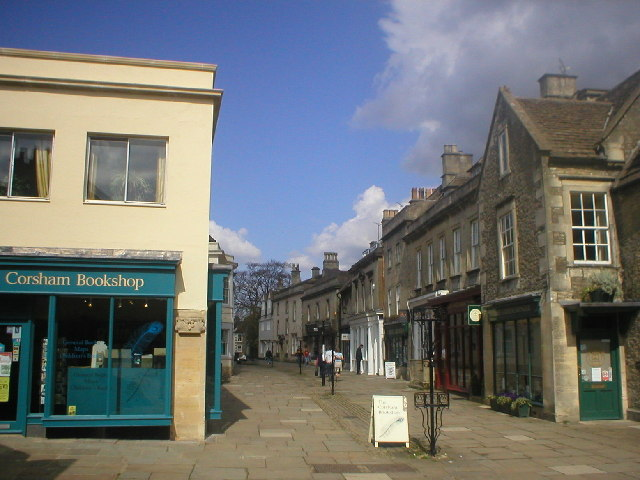
The southern portion of the High Street is pedestrianised

== See also ==
Neighbouring civil parishes (anticlockwise from the north):

- Biddestone – small village north of Hartham
- Colerne – medium-sized village northwest of Corsham and Pickwick
- Box – village west of Corsham; parish includes part of Rudloe
- Atworth – Neston Park Estate extends south beyond Atworth village
- Lacock – historic village and abbey, largely owned by the National Trust, east of Gastard
- Chippenham and Chippenham Without parishes – market town north-east of Easton

Nearby sites of Special Scientific Interest (SSSIs):

- Box Mine (near Rudloe and Box Tunnel)
- Colerne Park and Monk's Wood, and Honeybrook Farm (near Biddestone and Colerne)
- Corsham Railway Cutting
