= United Kingdom Youth Rocketry Challenge =

UKROC Logo

The UK Youth Rocketry Challenge (UKROC, previously UKAYRoC) is a youth rocket building competition, established in 2007. It provides secondary school student teams (of 3 to 5 members aged 11 to 18), a realistic experience in designing a flying aerospace vehicle that meets a specified set of mission and performance requirements. Students have to work together in teams, emulating the practices of real aerospace engineers. Not intended to be easy, and considered well within the capabilities of secondary school students with a good background in science and maths, and some craftsmanship skills.

Run by ADS, its key goal is to "Encourage school children to enter the world of aerospace and science".

The winner goes forward to represent the UK competing in the International Rocketry Challenge against the winners of the American, French and Japanese competitions.

== The challenge ==
For each competition UKROC teams have had to design, construct and successfully launch a rocket to carry one or more raw medium size hen's egg as close to a specified altitude, for a specific flight time, then return the egg and altimeter payload section safely, and undamaged to earth using a specified means of deceleration.

Many teams choose to design their rockets on simulation programs, such as Spacecad and RockSim, which not only enable them to design, but also calculate how well a rocket will perform in different weather conditions.

== History ==
From 2007 to 2009 finals were held at Charterhouse School, Surrey.

The 2008 finalists were: 342 Ealing and Brentford ATC, Beaumont School, Coombeshead College, Costessey High School, Crofton School, Dinnington Comprehensive School, Harrogate Grammar, Holywells High School, Horsforth Secondary School, Keighley Guides, Lancaster School, Loreto College, Royal Liberty School, Salt Grammar School, Shipston High School, Thornton Grammar and Wootton Bassett School.

The 2009 finalists were: 342 Ealing and Brentford ATC, Coombeshead College, Dinnington Comprehensive School, Holywells High School, Horsforth School, John Leggott Sixth Form College, Lostock Hall Community High School, Portchester Community College, Royal Liberty School, Saffron Walden County High School, Shipston High School, Thornton Grammar School and Titus Salt School.

In 2010 UKRA announced that it had withdrawn all official support from the UKAYRoC competition.

The 2010 finalists were: Abbeyfield School, Bradford Grammar School, The Community Science College @ Thornhill, Dinnington Comprehensive School, Girls Aloft (Victoria College), Horsforth Secondary School, John Leggott College, Lostock Hall, Royal Liberty School, Thornton Grammar School, Wootton Bassett School and Worksop College.

The 2011 and 2012 finals were held at the Bruntingthorpe Proving Ground, Leicestershire.

The 2011 finalists were: Penglais School, The Perse School, Royal Liberty School, Bradford Grammar School, Southend High School for Boys, Dinnington Comprehensive, Exmouth Community College, Worksop College, 342 Ealing and Brentford ATC, Horsforth School, Ipswich Academy, The Thomas Hardye School, Abbeyfield School, Lostock Hall High School, The Community Science College @ Thornhill and Boston Spa School.

The 2012 finalists were: Royal Liberty School, Longstone Special School, Samuel Lister Academy, Whitley Bay High School, Abbeyfield School, Airedale Academy, The Perse School, Our Lady's Grammar School, 1429 Squadron Aberporth ATC, Victoria College Belfast, The Thomas Hardye School, Worksop College, Lostock Hall Academy and Royal Wootton Bassett Academy.

The 2013 finals were held on 8 May, at Queen’s Parade, Farnborough.

The finalists were: North Halifax Grammar School, 1114 (Gosforth) ATC Squadron, Worksop College, Abbeyfield School, 10th Chippenham Air Scouts, Perse School, Victoria College Belfast, Ashville College, Airedale Academy, Egglescliffe School, Lostock Hall Academy, The Royal Liberty School, Whitley Bay High School, Longstone School and Boston Spa School.

Places	1st	2nd	3rd
2007	Buttershaw Enterprise College	Crofton School	Royal Liberty School
2008	Horsforth School	Crofton School Team 1	Salt Grammar School
2009	Liberty Hope School	Saffron Walden Team 1	Victoria College
2010	Horsforth School Team 2	Wootton Bassett School Team 1	Community Science College@Thornhill Team 1
2011	Worksop College Team 2	Southend High School for Boys	Dinnington Comprehensive Team 1
2012	The Perse School Team 2	The Thomas Hardye School	Abbeyfield School Team 3
2013	The Royal Liberty School	1114 (Gosforth) ATC Squadron	Whitley Bay High School
2019	North Halifax Grammar School	Unknown	Unknown

== Media coverage ==
In 2009, BBC Look North ran a news item on the event, and it featured on the children's show Blue Peter.

In 2011, the competition received a mention on ITV News Central and featured in two BBC Online articles.
