= Hardenhuish School =

Location
- Hardenhuish Lane; Chippenham, Wiltshire, SN14 6RJ; England; 51°28′11″N 2°07′40″W

Information
- Type: Academy
- Motto: inspired to learn, supported to succeed
- Established: 1975
- Department for Education URN: 136296 Tables
- Ofsted: Reports
- Head teacher: Lisa Percy
- Gender: Mixed
- Age: 11 to 18
- Enrolment: 1,623
- Colours: Green and gold
- Former name: Chippenham Grammar School
- Website: www.hardenhuish.wilts.sch.uk

Hardenhuish School (formerly The Chippenham School, Chippenham Grammar School and Chippenham Girls' High School) is a large mixed secondary school and sixth form in Chippenham, Wiltshire, England, for students aged 11 to 18. Together with Abbeyfield School and Sheldon School, it is one of three secondary schools in the town with academy status. The school's headteacher is Lisa Percy.

The school is in the Hardenhuish area in the north-west of Chippenham. Its main building is Hardenhuish House, a large Grade II* listed late-18th-century house. Sheldon School lies to the south, in the southern part of the former grounds of the house.

== History of the Hardenhuish area ==
=== Earliest records ===
In 854AD, documents record a settlement known as Hardenhuish on the north-west side of Chippenham; the name probably derives from the family landholding of one Herejeard. In 1066, the Domesday survey recorded the tenant of Hardenehus as Arnulf, who held it before this date. The medieval manor house and church were on the flat land which now forms playing fields shared between Hardenhuish and Sheldon schools.

=== 18th century ===
In 1759, Joseph Colborne (a member of the tallow chandlers' guild and part of a prominent local medical family) purchased the house and estate from descendants of the Hawkins family, who had taken the manor house on from the Dunch family in 1622. Eventually he selected a new site for a fine Georgian house, Hardenhuish House, on higher ground to the north, built in 1773 to 1774. The previous house was demolished and the grounds were landscaped. Joseph Colborne of Hardenhuish was appointed Sheriff of Wiltshire for the year 1777.

In 1776, Joseph Colborne decided that a new church should be erected on higher ground to the west of his new Georgian house. Dedicated to Saint Nicholas, it was designed by the famous Bath architect John Wood and is supposed to contain recycled material from the earlier church. It was completed in 1779. Joseph Colborne's sister, Anne – who had married London merchant Abraham Craiesteyn – had been buried at the earlier church in 1764, and her remains were moved to the new church.

The ruins of a raised stone summer house in Hardenhuish wood and the cobbled flooring of a stable are still visible, as well as a stone wall, formerly a garden store, on the hill behind the property. These features, alongside the neo-classical architecture of the house, act as an educational resource used by the school's history department.

Joseph Colborne died in 1781. The ownership of Hardenhuish passed to his daughter Anne, who was married to John Hawkins of Kelston, near Bath. Their second son, George Hawkins, was next to inherit Hardenhuish.

=== 19th century ===
In 1822, Thomas Clutterbuck, who had land and business interests in both Gloucestershire and Bradford on Avon, bought the Hardenhuish estate from George Hawkins.

Henrietta, a daughter of the economist and MP David Ricardo, married Thomas Clutterbuck in 1814 in London, and he subsequently became well acquainted with the family. Many of his original works remained with the family for at least a century. David Ricardo died in 1823, and was buried at Hardenhuish church.

In 1826, Thomas Clutterbuck of Hardenhuish was Sheriff of Wiltshire.

The renowned diarist Francis Kilvert was born opposite the estate in 1840 in the rectory, and he subsequently befriended the Clutterbuck children who are referenced in his diaries alongside the estate.

In 1854, Edmund Lewis Clutterbuck of Hardenhuish was Sheriff of Wiltshire. The Clutterbuck family and their heirs held the Hardenhuish estate until the 1930s.

== Schools ==
From 1823 there was a private venture grammar school in Chippenham, conducted in St. Mary Street by William Heaven Wicks, then his son-in-law John Wilson and from 1883 moved to Gutter Lane to be run by Robert Cruikshank.

In 1891 the Technical Instruction Act 1889 (52 & 53 Vict. c. 76) and the Technical Instruction Act 1891 (54 & 55 Vict. c. 4) provided financial assistance for evening classes in various science and arts subjects. Earlier voluntary classes that had existed were now coordinated, and this became the beginning of a national system of technical education. Subjects included Shorthand, Animal Physiology, Chemistry, Physics, Hygiene, Carpentry and Dressmaking.

In 1893, Edward Newall Tuck was appointed by the Education Committee of the Borough of Chippenham to organise technical classes in Chippenham and district. Classes were held in rented premises at No. 21 London Road and at the Jubilee Institute, as well as villages including Grittleton and Yatton Keynell. Teachers from elementary schools attended classes in a School of Art on Saturdays at the Jubilee Institute. Tuck, in addition, gave talks on Wiltshire history and nature study, he also served as town councillor and was Mayor of Chippenham from 1931 to 1932.

In 1894, pupils were not admitted to classes until they reached the age of 11. Pupils from day schools were admitted free from aged 11 to 16. The fees at this time were fixed at 6d per month, the whole expenses of the school being met by fees and grants from the Science and Art Department and the County Council. Higher grade classes for boys, including Woodwork and Chemistry, were held at No. 21 London Road.

=== John Coles ===
In 1896, under the provisions of the Technical and Industrial Institutions Act 1892 (55 & 56 Vict. c. 29), the Borough of Chippenham established the Chippenham and District County School, subsequently known as the Chippenham County Secondary School for Boys and Girls, with Tuck as the first headmaster (he would remain in this post until 1929). The first Chair of Governors was former mayor Alderman John Coles.

The premises were still at No. 21 London Road and the Jubilee Institute. As the tenancy of the private venture school was to end on 25 March 1896, the Town Council paid Cruikshank £10 for the desks, books and goodwill of his school. Boys were drawn from three elementary schools in Chippenham, the British, National and St. Paul's Schools. In addition twelve boys had previously attended the private grammar school. Others were from other private schools in Chippenham, Corsham, Devizes, Calne and surrounding villages. 39 boys aged 11 to 16 were on the admission register from 13 April 1896. The curriculum included Latin, French, Science, History, Geography, Grammar, Book-keeping, Shorthand, Arithmetic, Writing, Geometry and Freehand Drawing.

In September 1898, a girls' school was established, against some opposition, in the Temperance Hall, Foghamshire. 22 girls were admitted at opening, from the schools of Mrs. Parry (Market Place), Miss Alexander (Monkton Hill), Mrs. White (Marshfield Road), from private tuition and from local National and British schools.

=== Early 20th century ===
On 24 September 1900, the Chippenham District County School opened in Cocklebury Lane, now part of Wiltshire College, (built on an acre of land purchased in 1896 by the County, Urban and Rural District Councils). The ceremony was attended by the Mayor and Aldermen of Chippenham. In addition to Mr. Edward Newall Tuck the headmaster, the staff included three masters and one mistress, there were 99 pupils. The total cost of the project was £6,000. In addition to the buildings and playground, four acres of adjoining land were rented for playing fields. All day classes were consolidated here and pupil numbers increased rapidly.

On 1 May 1901 the decision was taken by the Governors for the school to become a Science School. 4 scholarships were granted to 3 female and 1 male students. In July it was decided to establish a centre for pupil-teachers at the school.

In 1902, local education authorities were established and Wiltshire County Council became responsible for education in Chippenham.

Latin was omitted from the curriculum.

By 1904 there were 101 pupils, 50 from urban and 51 from rural areas. In addition 49 pupil teachers were attending, 9 from urban and the remainder from rural schools, and the evening classes had 139 pupils.

From 1905, girls from elementary schools attended Cookery classes at the Cocklebury Road site.

In 1906, Sir Gabriel Goldney, 2nd Baronet, CVO, CB of Hardenhuish Park became Sheriff of Wiltshire.

By October 1907 the school had 128 pupils, 64 boys and 64 girls. The age of admission was 9, and the leaving age 17 to 18. In addition to the yearly fees paid by pupils, the school was financed by County and Government grants.

In 1908, the fees were £5 5s. 0d. a year, including books. However, there were a number of scholarships available and figures for the year show that of 115 pupils, 66 girls and 49 boys, 57 held scholarships, one a free place, and only 57 were fee-payers.

=== The interwar years ===
In 1922, the school received further county and government grants.

In the interwar years, numbers of pupils on roll increased steadily, and by 1929 there were 262. The Junior department was reorganised as a Kindergarten and Preparatory Form, catering for 61 children aged 8 to 10. However, the number of pupils over the age of 16 was proportionally small in comparison with the average for Wiltshire grammar schools and consequently there was no discrete sixth form, although a small number of pupils did progress to university, some with the aid of County Scholarships.

By the early 1930s, the buildings were presenting difficulties of overcrowding. A site in Marshfield Road was considered for a new school building, but ultimately rejected.

In 1935, when pupil numbers had reached 288, Hardenhuish Park was purchased from the Clutterbuck family by Wiltshire County Council in order to implement the educational requirements of the growing town.

=== Grammar School ===
In September 1939, the Secondary Grammar School formally moved from Cocklebury Road to new buildings (since demolished), erected on the east side of Hardenhuish House. The old Manor House became the headmaster's room, the school library and some classrooms. The last private tenant of the house was Major Edward Robert Portal. The new school extended over 40 acres of Hardenhuish Park, and the new buildings contained a hall, gymnasium, laboratories, classrooms, and cloakrooms.

In 1939, the Preparatory department closed. By 1940 there were 414 pupils, of whom 25 were evacuees, 10 percent were under the age of 11 and, still, only 2 percent over 16.

With pressure mounting on existing elementary schools in the town during 1940, due to rising age of leaving, overcrowding and more evacuees, Standards VI to VIII from the elementary schools were accommodated at the Cocklebury Road site, with teachers to support them. This became Chippenham Temporary Senior School in November 1940. After the Education Act 1944 this school became Chippenham County Secondary Modern School, a senior mixed school taking children aged 11 and over from the primary schools of Chippenham and district.

In late 1940, early 1941 the school at Hardenhuish took in a large number of evacuees from Wanstead, East London, who had already spent a year in Gloucester. A field next to school housed a camp occupied by soldiers of the 4th Armored Division and 11th Armored Division, whose headquarters were at Lackham House and Manor. Close relations developed between these troops and the school.

=== Post WWII ===
Following the war, there was a steady increase in the numbers of pupils and additional buildings were constructed. Some of the Nissen huts used by the American soldiers were repurposed as classrooms, while others housed relocated families from blitzed areas. The catchment area of the school covered the triangle between Chippenham, Corsham and Melksham.

In 1956, with pupil number at 547, (102 of these in the Sixth Form), constant growth of the area saw the major development of a new secondary modern school for girls to the south of Hardenhuish Church. On 28 September, the new Girls' High School opened. These buildings now form part of Hardenhuish School. The Headmistress, Miss (Edith) Cassia Denne, had 486 pupils in her charge.

In 1958, a field was purchased at the Folly to enable an approach road to be made to serve the new secondary schools.

=== Chippenham Boys' High School ===
In 1959, a secondary modern, Chippenham Boys' High School, was constructed lower down Hardenhuish Park. These buildings now form part of Sheldon School.

In 1960, more Grammar School buildings were erected behind Hardenhuish House due to the continual growth of Chippenham. The school began to admit 120 instead of 90 each year. The three schools occupied some 40 acres of Hardenhuish Park and some 2,000 boys and girls attended from the Borough and from the district within a radius of about 8 miles.

In 1966, the Grammar School and the Girls' High School integrated with the Chippenham Secondary Modern Schools in a semi-comprehensive system with all 11- to 13-year-old boys and girls being educated on the Hardenhuish site. Some 13-18-year-olds were educated in the former Grammar School buildings, and this was named The Chippenham School.

=== Comprehensive ===
In 1975, the three schools were merged into two comprehensive schools, under the names Hardenhuish and Sheldon. Hardenhuish was made up of the old Grammar School and Girls' High School buildings, spanning right across the old Hardenhuish estate and comprising seven blocks.

The 1975 Chippenham development plan stated: "Two mixed 8 form entry comprehensive schools each to accommodate 1,200 pupils aged 11 to 18, with 200 in each school sixth form additionally, to be formed on the campus at Hardenhuish by merging the existing three schools. The Boys’ High School to have additional classrooms and accommodation for girls. The Girls’ High School and the Chippenham School to be merged into one school".

Hardenhuish would serve the northern and western areas of Chippenham and adjacent villages, while Sheldon would take pupils from the southern and eastern areas of the town and adjacent villages.

In September 1975, Hardenhuish School opened as a comprehensive school in the Grammar School and Girls’ High School buildings, and renamed to reflect the school having become coeducational.

A £2 million capital building project was begun in the 1990s. Completed in 2003, the new Technology Centre began the first phase, soon followed by the new Sports Hall with climbing wall, the new English and Performing Arts Centre, and the redeveloped Science and Maths Centres. The school was awarded Specialist School Status as a Mathematics and Computing College.

A new two-storey Sixth Form Centre was completed in 2009. In April of that year the school added a second specialism in Science.

=== Academy ===
In September 2010, Hardenhuish converted to academy status, becoming one of the first converter academies.

== Academic performance ==
Hardenhuish received the tenth highest A-level average results for comprehensives in Wiltshire at the end of the 2009/2010 school year. As well as expertise in the specialisms of Mathematics & Computing and Science, Hardenhuish has received many awards over recent years, some of which are the ICT Mark in 2010, designated a Lead School for Gifted & Talented learners, and the International School Award every year since 2010. In its 2008 Ofsted report, Hardenhuish was judged to be "outstanding".

== Headteachers ==
As three different schools have occupied the site at different times, some headships ran concurrently.

Prior to the move to the Hardenhuish site, the head teacher of Chippenham Grammar School from 1893 until 1929 was Edward Newell Tuck.

Head teacher of Chippenham Grammar School, at the Cocklebury Road site, from 1929 until 1932 was Scottish-born Henry Samuel Rosen. Prior to this appointment he had been head of The County School in Bradford on Avon for three years.

Head teacher of Chippenham Grammar School from 1932 until 1935 was Basil Alais Fletcher, who left when appointed Chair of Education at Dalhousie University, Nova Scotia. Under his leadership, moves began to be made toward re-siting the school at Hardenhuish.

Head teacher of Chippenham Grammar School from 1935 until 1939 was Hugh William Heckstall-Smith. He had previously been headteacher of Ludlow Grammar School in Shropshire. He left the school to undertake research in agriculture.

Head teacher of Chippenham Grammar School from 1939, when it moved to the Hardenhuish site, until 1961 was Sydney Farrar. Prior to this appointment he had been head of Fitzmaurice Grammar School in Bradford on Avon for 10 years.

Also on the Hardenhuish site, the head teacher of Chippenham Girls' Secondary Modern School, later Chippenham Girls’ High School, from 1956 until 1966 was (Edith) Cassia Denne. After Denne retired, the head teacher of Chippenham Girls' Secondary Modern School from 1966 was Miss M Wilkins, who had previously been headmistress of the Down Girls' School in Sussex.

Head teacher of Chippenham Grammar School from 1961 until 1966, and then The Chippenham School from 1966 until 1970, was Robert Radford Stephens, always known by his initials R R. Prior to his appointment he had been a teacher in Liverpool, then head of Wolverhampton Municipal Grammar School, then Mundella Grammar School, Nottingham.

Head teacher of The Chippenham School from 1970 was Mr John A Hargreaves, who had come from Camelford School in Somerset. He was presiding in 1975, at the merger of the Chippenham School and the Girls’ High School to form Hardenhuish School. He was then head teacher of the new Hardenhuish School. He took sudden early retirement in 1981, and deputy head Mary Hill held the head position temporarily.

Robert J Alderman was head teacher of Hardenhuish School from 1981 until at least 1988, followed by Colin Smith from 1989 to 2010. He was replaced by Jan Hatherall, who had joined the school as head of science in 1989; she retired at the end of the 2015/16 academic year and was replaced by Lisa Percy, promoted from deputy headteacher.

== Notable alumni ==
=== Hardenhuish School ===
- David Bishop – international track and field athlete

=== The Chippenham School ===
- Victoria Wicks – actor

=== Chippenham Grammar School ===
- Jeremy Broun – furniture designer
- Prof John Eggleston – Professor of Education 1985–1996 at the University of Warwick, and 1967–1984 at Keele University
- Roland Freeman – first Conservative President of the NUS 1956–1958, and Leader in 1961 of Wandsworth London Borough Council; he co-founded Radio Barbican which became LBC, later joining the SDP then the Labour Party
- Prof Paul L. Harris, child psychologist and Victor S. Thomas Professor of Education since 2001 at Harvard University, and Professor of Development Psychology 1998–2001 at the University of Oxford
- Christopher Hinton OM – nuclear engineer responsible for the design of the Calder Hall power station, first Chairman of the CEGB 1957–1964, President 1966–1967 of the IMechE, Chancellor 1966–80 of Bath University, President 1976–1983 of the Council of Engineering Institutions (CEI)
- Geoff Jenkins (climatologist) – former Head of Climate Change Prediction at the Hadley Centre for Climate Prediction and Research
- Gary Leitzell – former mayor of Dayton, Ohio
- Prof Trevor Saunders, Professor of Greek 1978–1999 at Newcastle University
- Heather Tanner (née Heather Muriel Spackman) – writer and campaigner, wife of Robin Tanner
- Robin Tanner – artist, etcher and printmaker, husband of Heather Tanner
- Val Haller – musician
