= Sheldon School =

Location
- Hardenhuish Lane; Chippenham, Wiltshire, SN14 6HJ; England; 51°28′02″N 2°08′02″W

Information
- Type: Academy
- Motto: Unity and Loyalty
- Established: 1975
- Department for Education URN: 136632 Tables
- Ofsted: Reports
- Head teacher: Peter Lynch
- Gender: Mixed
- Age: 11 to 18
- Enrollment: 1,619 (March 2023)
- Colours: Blue, purple and gold
- Publication: Sheldon Standard
- Former name: Chippenham Boys' High School
- Website: www.sheldonschool.co.uk

Sheldon School (formerly Chippenham Boys' High School) is a large mixed secondary school and sixth form in Chippenham, Wiltshire for students aged 11 to 18 and is the largest school in Wiltshire. Since April 2011, it has been an Academy. It is one of three secondary schools in Chippenham, the others being Abbeyfield and Hardenhuish. The school is headed by Peter Lynch, former Headteacher of Bradley Stoke Community School, who was appointed in September 2023. The school is off the Hardenhuish Lane in the southern region of Hardenhuish Park, which is all that separates it from Hardenhuish School to the north.

== History ==
=== Earliest records ===
In AD 854, documents record the settlement known as Hardenhuish on the north-west side of Chippenham. The name probably derives from the family holding of one Herejeard, who occupied the land.

In 1066, the Domesday survey establishes the owner as Arnulf who held it before this date. The medieval manor house and church were situated on the flat land which now forms Sheldon School's playing fields.

=== 18th century ===
In 1707, the Colborne family purchased the estate and selected a new site for a fine Georgian house, Hardenhuish House, on higher ground to the north, built from 1773 to 1774.

In 1777, Joseph Colborne of Hardenhuish became Sheriff of Wiltshire.

In 1779, Colborne decided that a new church should be erected on higher ground to the west of his new house. Dedicated to Saint Nicholas, it was designed by the famous Bath architect John Wood and is supposed to contain recycled material from the earlier church.

=== 19th century ===
In 1822, the Clutterbuck family bought the Hardenhuish estate.

In 1826, Thomas Clutterbuck of Hardenhuish became Sheriff of Wiltshire.

In 1854, Edmund Lewis Clutterbuck of Hardenhuish became Sheriff of Wiltshire.

From 1875 a private venture grammar school existed in Chippenham, conducted in St. Mary Street by a Mr. Wilson and from 1883 by Mr. Cruikshank.

In 1891, the Technical Instruction Act 1889 (52 & 53 Vict. c. 76) and the Technical Instruction Act 1891 (54 & 55 Vict. c. 4) provided financial assistance for evening classes in various science and arts subjects. Earlier voluntary classes were now coordinated, and this became the beginning of a national system of technical education. Subjects included Shorthand, Animal Physiology, Chemistry, Physics, Hygiene, Carpentry and Dressmaking.

In 1893, Edward Newall Tuck was appointed by the Education Committee of the Borough of Chippenham to organise technical classes in Chippenham and district. Classes were held in rented premises at No. 21 London Road and at the Jubilee Institute, as well as villages including Grittleton and Yatton Keynell. Teachers from elementary schools attended classes in a School of Art on Saturdays at the Jubilee Institute. Tuck, in addition, gave talks on Wiltshire history and nature study; he also served as town councillor and was Mayor of Chippenham from 1931 to 1932.

In 1894, pupils were not admitted to classes until they reached the age of 11. Pupils from day schools were admitted free from aged 11 to 16. The fees at this time were fixed at 6d per month, the whole expenses of the school being met by fees and grants from the Science and Art Department and the County Council. Higher grade classes for boys, including Woodwork and Chemistry, were held at No. 21 London Road.

=== John Coles ===
In 1896, under the provisions of the Technical and Industrial Institutions Act 1892 (55 & 56 Vict. c. 29), the Borough of Chippenham established the Chippenham and District County School, subsequently known as the Chippenham County Secondary School for Boys and Girls, with Tuck as the first headmaster (he would remain in this post until 1939). The first Chair of Governors was former mayor Alderman John Coles.

The premises were still No. 21 London Road and the Jubilee Institute. As the tenancy of the private venture school was to end on 25 March 1896, the Town Council paid Cruikshank £10 for the desks, books and goodwill of his school. Boys were drawn from three elementary schools in Chippenham: the British, National and St. Paul's Schools. In addition, twelve boys had previously attended the private grammar school. Others were from other private schools in Chippenham, Corsham, Devizes, Calne and surrounding villages. 39 boys aged 11 to 16 were on the admission register from 13 April 1896. The curriculum included Latin, French, Science, History, Geography, Grammar, Book-keeping, Shorthand, Arithmetic, Writing, Geometry and Freehand Drawing.

In September 1898, a girls' school was established, against some opposition, in the Temperance Hall, Foghamshire. 22 girls were admitted at opening, from the schools of Mrs Parry (Market Place), Miss Alexander (Monkton Hill), Mrs White (Marshfield Road), from private tuition and from local National and British schools.

=== 20th century ===
On 24 September 1900, the Chippenham District County School opened in Cocklebury Lane, now part of Wiltshire College, (built on an acre of land purchased in 1896 by the County, Urban and Rural District Councils). The ceremony was attended by the Mayor and Aldermen of Chippenham. In addition to Mr Edward Newall Tuck the headmaster, the staff included three masters and one mistress; there were 99 pupils. The cost of the project was £6,000. In addition to the buildings and playground, four acres of adjoining land were rented for playing fields. All day classes were consolidated here and pupil numbers increased rapidly.

On 1 May 1901, the decision was taken by the Governors for the school to become a Science School. Scholarships were granted to three female and one male student. In July it was decided to establish a centre for pupil-teachers at the school.

In 1902, local education authorities were established and Wiltshire County Council became responsible for education in Chippenham.

Latin was omitted from the curriculum.

By 1904 there were 101 pupils, 50 from urban and 51 from rural areas. In addition, 49 pupil teachers were attending, 9 from urban and the remainder from rural schools, and the evening classes had 139 pupils.

From 1905, girls from elementary schools attended Cookery classes at the Cocklebury Road site.

In 1906, Sir Gabriel Goldney, 2nd Baronet, of Hardenhuish Park became Sheriff of Wiltshire.

By October 1907 the school had 128 pupils, 64 boys and 64 girls. The age of admission was 9, and the leaving age 17 to 18. In addition to the yearly fees paid by pupils, the school was financed by County and Government grants.

In 1908 the fees were £5 5s. 0d. a year, including books. However, there were a number of scholarships available and figures for the year show that of 115 pupils – 66 girls and 49 boys – 57 held scholarships, one a free place, thus only 57 were fee-payers.

=== The interwar years ===
In 1922, the school received further County and Government grants.

In the interwar years, the number of pupils on roll increased steadily, and by 1929 there were 262. The Junior department was reorganised as a kindergarten and preparatory form, catering for 61 children aged 8 to 10. However, the number of pupils over the age of 16 was proportionally small in comparison with the average for Wiltshire grammar schools, consequently, there was no discrete sixth form, although a small number of pupils did progress to university, some with the aid of County Scholarships.

By the early 1930s, the buildings were presenting difficulties of overcrowding.

By 1935, pupil numbers had reached 288. Hardenhuish Park was purchased from the Clutterbuck family by Wiltshire County Council in order to implement the educational requirements of the growing town.

=== Grammar school ===
In 1938, the Secondary Grammar School moved from Cocklebury Road to new buildings (since demolished), erected on the east side of Hardenhuish House. The old Manor House became the headmaster's room, the school library and some classrooms. The new school extended over 40 acres of Hardenhuish Park. New buildings contained a hall, gymnasium, laboratories, classrooms, and cloakrooms.

In 1939, the Preparatory department closed.

By 1940 there were 414 pupils, of whom 25 were evacuees, 10 per cent were under the age of 11 and, still, only 2 per cent over 16. The Cocklebury Road premises became Chippenham County Secondary Modern School, a senior mixed school taking children aged 11 and over from the primary schools of Chippenham and district.

In late 1940 and early 1941 the school took in a large number of evacuees from Wanstead, East London, who had already spent a year in Gloucester. A field next to the school housed a camp occupied by soldiers of the 4th Armored Division and 11th Armored Division, whose headquarters were at Lackham House and Manor. Close relations developed between these troops and the school.

=== Post WWII ===
In 1946, Eric Minter was appointed the headmaster at Chippenham County Secondary Modern School.

Following the war, there was a steady increase in the numbers of pupils and additional buildings were constructed. The catchment area of the school covered the triangle between Chippenham, Corsham and Melksham.

In 1956, with pupil numbers at 547 (102 of these in the sixth form), constant growth of the area saw the major development of a new secondary modern school for girls to the south of Hardenhuish Church. On 28 September, the new Girls' High School opened. These buildings now form part of Hardenhuish School.

In 1958, a field was purchased at the Folly to enable an approach road to be made to serve the new secondary schools.

=== Chippenham Boys' High School ===
In 1959, a secondary modern, Chippenham Boys' High School, was constructed lower down Hardenhuish Park. These buildings now form part of Sheldon School. The school was officially opened on 8 July 1959 by the Minister of Education, Mr. Geoffrey Lloyd.

In 1960, more Grammar School buildings were erected behind Hardenhuish House due to the continual growth of Chippenham. The school began to admit 120 instead of 90 each year. The three schools occupied some 40 acres of Hardenhuish Park and some 2,000 boys and girls attended from the Borough and from the district within a radius of about eight miles.

In 1966, the Grammar School and the Girls' High School integrated with the Chippenham secondary modern schools in a semi-comprehensive system with all 11 to 13-year-old boys and girls being educated on the Hardenhuish site. Minter retired as headmaster and was awarded the OBE.

In 1967, George Morgan was appointed the headmaster.

=== Comprehensive ===
In 1975, the three schools were merged into two comprehensive schools, under the names Hardenhuish and Sheldon. Hardenhuish was made up of the old Grammar School and Girls' High School buildings, spread across the old Hardenhuish estate and comprising seven blocks. Sheldon would take pupils from the southern and eastern areas of the town and villages to the west of the Malmesbury road, while Hardenhuish would serve the northern and western areas of Chippenham and villages to the east.

The headmaster George Morgan chose the name "Sheldon" (once a medieval village, then a manor), to reflect the school's having become coeducational.

In 1979, Anita Higham became headteacher and was replaced by Caroline Cox in 1985.

In 1991, admissions procedure changed to allow pupils living in the designated area of Chippenham urban primary schools to state a preference for either comprehensive school.

The Science block was added in 1996, followed by the Design & Technology block in 1998.

In 1997, Tony Cleaver was appointed headteacher. The school was listed in The Observer’s Top 100 State Schools. Sheldon became the first school in Wiltshire to gain the national Investors in People Award, recognising the quality of staff training and development. It also achieved the new Sportsmark award for the "outstanding quality of physical education and sporting provision", one of only 400 schools nationally to receive the accolade. Work on the new AstroTurf pitch was completed.

In 1999, Sheldon became a Foundation School. The school's intake increased to 10 tutor groups. It also had its second "outstanding" Ofsted report.

=== 21st century ===
In 2000, Sheldon was identified as "excellent" by Ofsted (Her Majesty's Chief Inspector of Schools In England). It was the first school in Wiltshire to be awarded Beacon Status, awarded to schools identified as the best performing in the country.

In 2001, Sheldon was awarded Sportsmark Gold, the first Wiltshire school to achieve this award.

In 2002, the school was awarded Specialist School Status and was designated as one of England's first Science Colleges. Sheldon was awarded FA Charter Standard from The Football Association.

In 2004, Gerard MacMahon was appointed headteacher. Sheldon was again awarded Sportsmark Gold. It was also awarded the Artsmark Award, for the quality of performing arts. The school also achieved The Healthy Schools Award.

In 2005, Sheldon was named in Ofsted's roll of honour as one of "the best of the best" with two "outstanding" inspections. It had its third "outstanding" Ofsted report, the only comprehensive school in the south west to have achieved this accolade. The school was also elected to the Specialist Schools Trust "Value Added" club for schools with the most pupil progress between key stages.

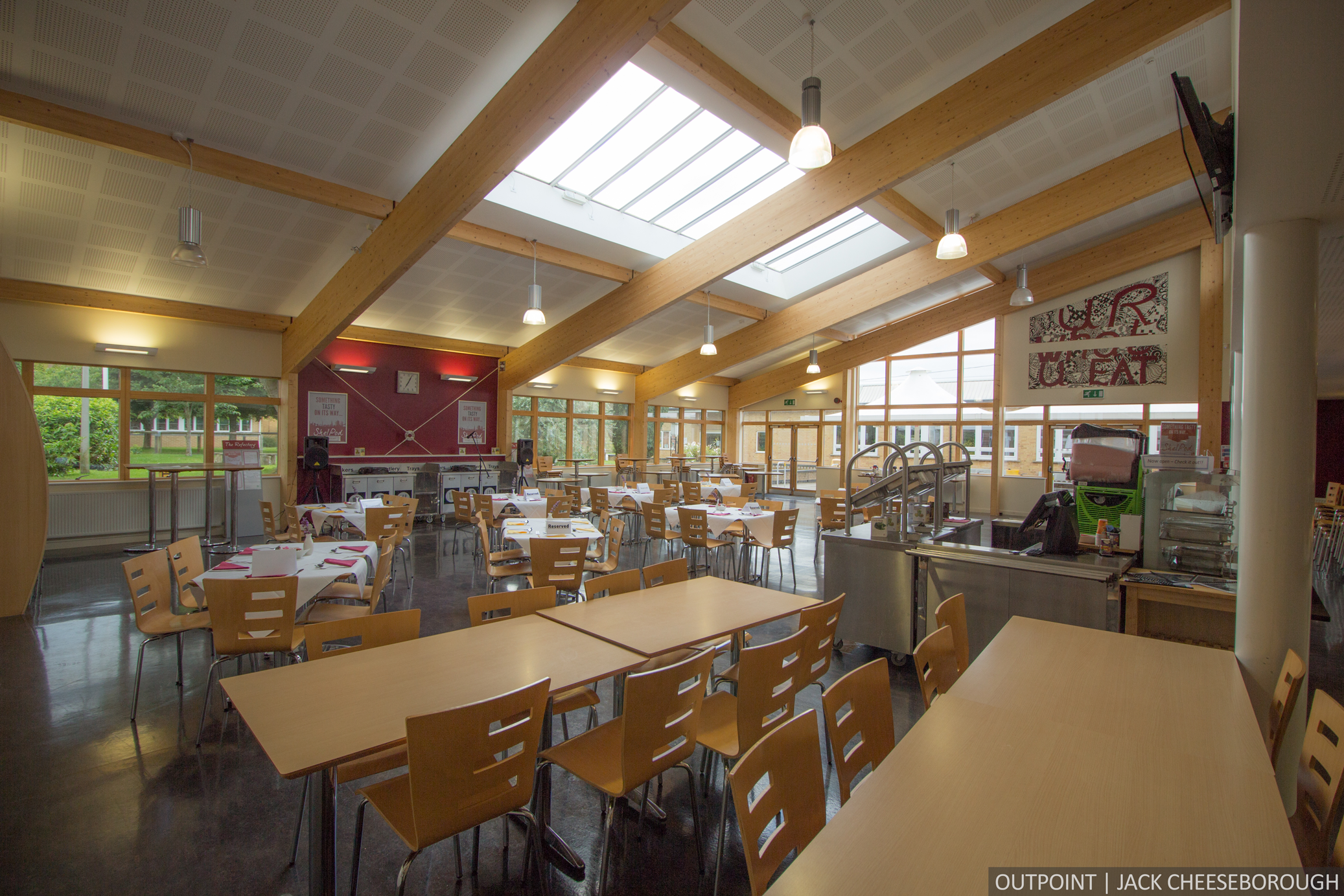
Sheldon School's Refectory in 2016

In 2008, in its fourth Ofsted inspection Sheldon was judged to be "outstanding" in all 38 categories that made up the new inspection framework. The Sixth Form Centre was opened.

In 2009, the school was designated a third specialism as a Language College.

=== Academy ===
On 1 April 2011, Sheldon School became an Academy.

In 2012, Neil Spurdell was appointed headteacher.

In 2023, Peter Lynch was appointed headteacher.

== Ofsted and academic performance ==
In its March 2008 inspection, Sheldon was judged to be "outstanding" in all 38 inspection categories, an exceptional achievement matched by only six comprehensive schools in 1,500 Ofsted inspections. In the January 2011 Interim Assessment statement, parents were informed that indications were that "performance has been sustained".

At the most recent full inspection in October 2012, Sheldon was judged to be "good" overall. Despite standards having dropped, the school was praised for its pupils' behaviour, stating that it was "outstanding". It also mentioned that "To improve further, the inspectors highlighted the need for the very good teaching observed in the classroom to be taken to an even higher level".

A short inspection in June 2017 repeated the "good" assessment, stating "The leadership team has maintained the good quality of education in the school since the last inspection". Concerns were raised over the difference in achievement between disadvantaged pupils and others, and the attendance record of some disadvantaged pupils.

== Notable alumni ==
- Gabrielle Aplin – singer-songwriter
- Thompson Cowan - rugby union player
- Jamie Cullum – jazz musician and broadcaster
- Tom Dunn – England international rugby union player
- Chris Horsman – former Welsh international rugby union player
- Yan Klukowski – professional footballer
- Tyrone Mings – England international footballer
- Sir Peter Wanless CB – Chief Executive at the NSPCC since June 2013, former Director of School Performance and Reform for the Department for Education and Skills
