= Cuerden Valley Park =

Park in Lancashire, England

- Interactive map of Cuerden Valley Park
- Location: Cuerden, England
- Nearest town: Leyland
- Coordinates: 53.6953°N 2.6517°W
- Area: 650 acres (2.6 km^{2})
- Operated by: Cuerden Valley Park Trust
- Status: Open
- Website: cuerdenvalleypark.org

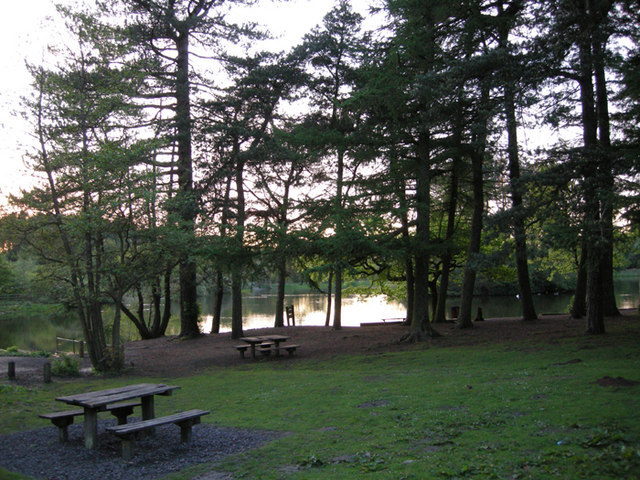
Lake at the park near the Cam Wood Lane / ASDA entrance.

Cuerden Valley Park is a park and green space located in Cuerden, Lancashire, England. The park is 650 acres (2.6 km^{2}) in size.

== Background ==
The park is located in Cuerden, Lancashire, England, and is adjacent to Preston, Clayton-le-Woods, and Whittle-le-Woods. The M65 runs through the northernmost section of the park.

== History ==
=== 1100s – 1800s ===
The earliest records of the park exists from 1199 that shows the lands were held by the Molineaux family approximately around the time of the Norman Conquest. The Manor of Cuerden passed to Roger Banastre in the 13th century.

A manor house, Cuerden Hall, is located adjacent to the park. It is a country house that was constructed in 1717, and extended between 1816 and 1819 by Lewis Wyatt. During the Industrial Revolution, two cotton mills were built by the river by William Clayton and William Eccles, which employed over 700 people in 1848. The hall was previously a Sue Ryder Care Home from 1985 to 2020. It is currently owned by Manchester businessman Colin Shenton and is being restored.

An old cotton mill, named Lower Kem Mill is located in the park next to the Whittle-le-Woods entrance by the old Cheeky Monkey's play centre. It was owned by Edward Leece until 1856 when he declared bankruptcy, and sold it to Henry Ward.

=== 1900s ===
In 1910 Lower Kem Mill's then-owner Joseph Cunliffe tried to sell the mill but was unable to, and it was destroyed in a fire in 1914.

In 1977 the Central Lancashire Development Corporation gained control of Cuerden Hall and the surrounding parkland from the Ministry of Defence and began constructing offices and car parks that are still used by the park's operators today.

In 1986 the charity Cuerden Valley Park Trust was formed. They later received ownership of the park in 1992 and continue to own and operate it.

=== 2000s – present ===
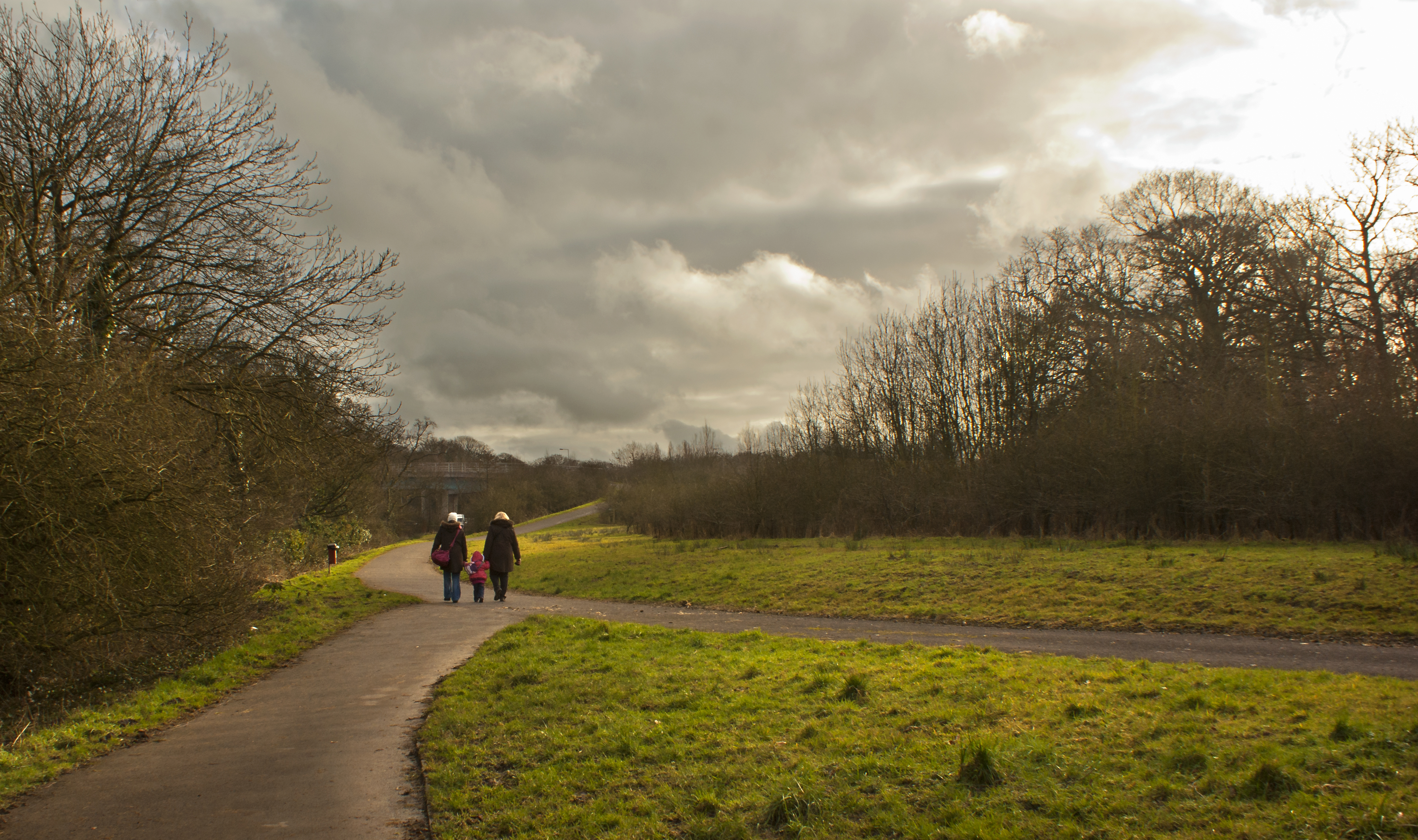
A section of the park by the River Lostock

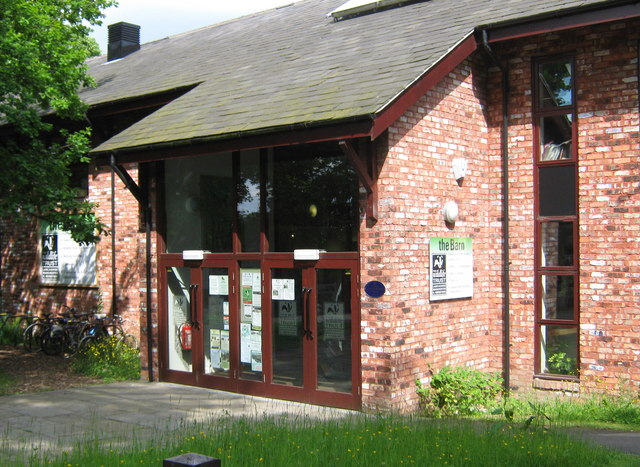
Visitor centre

In 2017 high levels of pollution in around 6 miles (9.7 km) of the River Lostock which runs through the park killed a number of fish. The park warned visitors to keep themselves and their pets out of the river. The river was polluted again in 2019 and 2023.

The park opened a new visitor centre and café which opened in June 2018. The building has large glass windows overlooking the valley. On 27 September 2021, the café was damaged after an arson attack and reopened on 16 October, but was temporarily relocated in 2022 to fully repair the damage. It was estimated that the attack cost £250,000 in damages. A 38 year-old man was arrested under suspicion of criminal damage.

In 2021 the park revoked permission for Parkrun to operate events on its land due to rising costs. The trust stated that "It is not equitable post-Covid 19 that a national organisation which attracts sponsorship deals with companies like Persil and Vitality, continues to use the Park for free 52 times a year, while the Trust faces huge financial struggles after 12 months of lockdown". Parkrun responded saying they were "disappointed" and "have no choice but to respect it".

In 2023 the park upgraded its footpath network to make it more accessible for a cost of £305,000. Upgrades included resurfacing works on cycle paths, flattening of steep paths, and a new footbridge.

On 11 December 2023, a dog wandered into a field and attacked a flock of six sheep, a second incident occurred three days later. Three sheep died in the attack. The park referred both incidents to the police and issued a press release warning that lambs may not be carried to term due to the stress on the sheep, and that it was likely that some could die.

In 2024 Lancashire County Council funded a new community wildflower garden in the park.
