= Cuerden Hall =

Listed building in Lancashire, England

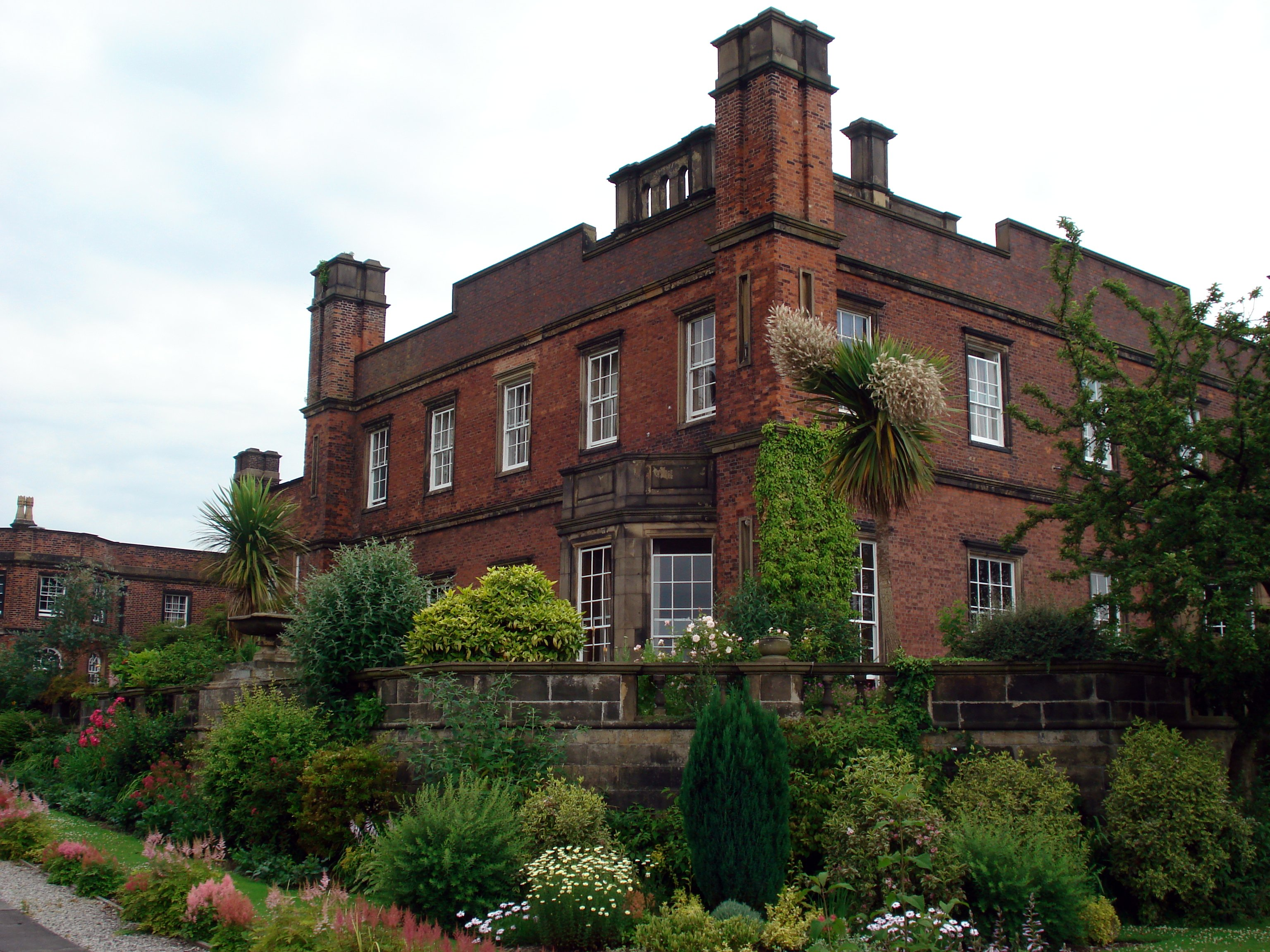
- The hall in 2009

- Location within the Borough of Chorley

General information
- Type: Country mansion
- Location: Cuerden Valley Park near Preston, Lancashire, England
- Coordinates: 53.7100°N 2.6621°W
- Years built: 17th century and 1816–19

Listed Building – Grade II*
- Official name: Cuerden Hall
- Designated: 21 February 1984
- Reference no.: 1362174

Cuerden Hall is a country mansion in the village of Cuerden near Preston, Lancashire, England. It is a Grade II* listed building. The hall was formerly a family home between 1717 and 1906, and used by the Army until the 1960s. In 1985 it became a Sue Ryder neurological care centre. The hall was sold to Manchester businessman Colin Shenton in 2020 who is restoring it to its original purpose as a family home. The parkland and wider estate are known as Cuerden Valley Park. Cuerden Valley Park is now owned and managed by Cuerden Valley Park Trust which was a charity established in 1986, to ensure the longevity and management of the parkland itself. The park includes 650 acres (260 ha) of land; a reservoir, 15 ponds, three reed beds; over 3.1 miles (5 km) of the River Lostock, and five nature reserves.

== History ==
The original house on the site which dated from the 17th century no longer exists. The Charnock family of Charnock Richard owned the estates until 1521, when Richard Charnock of Cuerden and Leyland sold his manor to Thomas Langton, Lord Newton.

In 1605 Henry Banastre of Bank Hall bought the estate from the Langton Family. Henry's daughter Alice, wife of Sir Thomas Haggerston Bt, held ownership in 1641.

The building present on the site dates from 1717 and was constructed by Banastre Parker when he moved the Parker family from Extwistle Hall. Upon his death in 1738 the estate passed to his son Robert Parker and in turn to his grandchildren Banastre Parker and Thomas Towneley Parker.

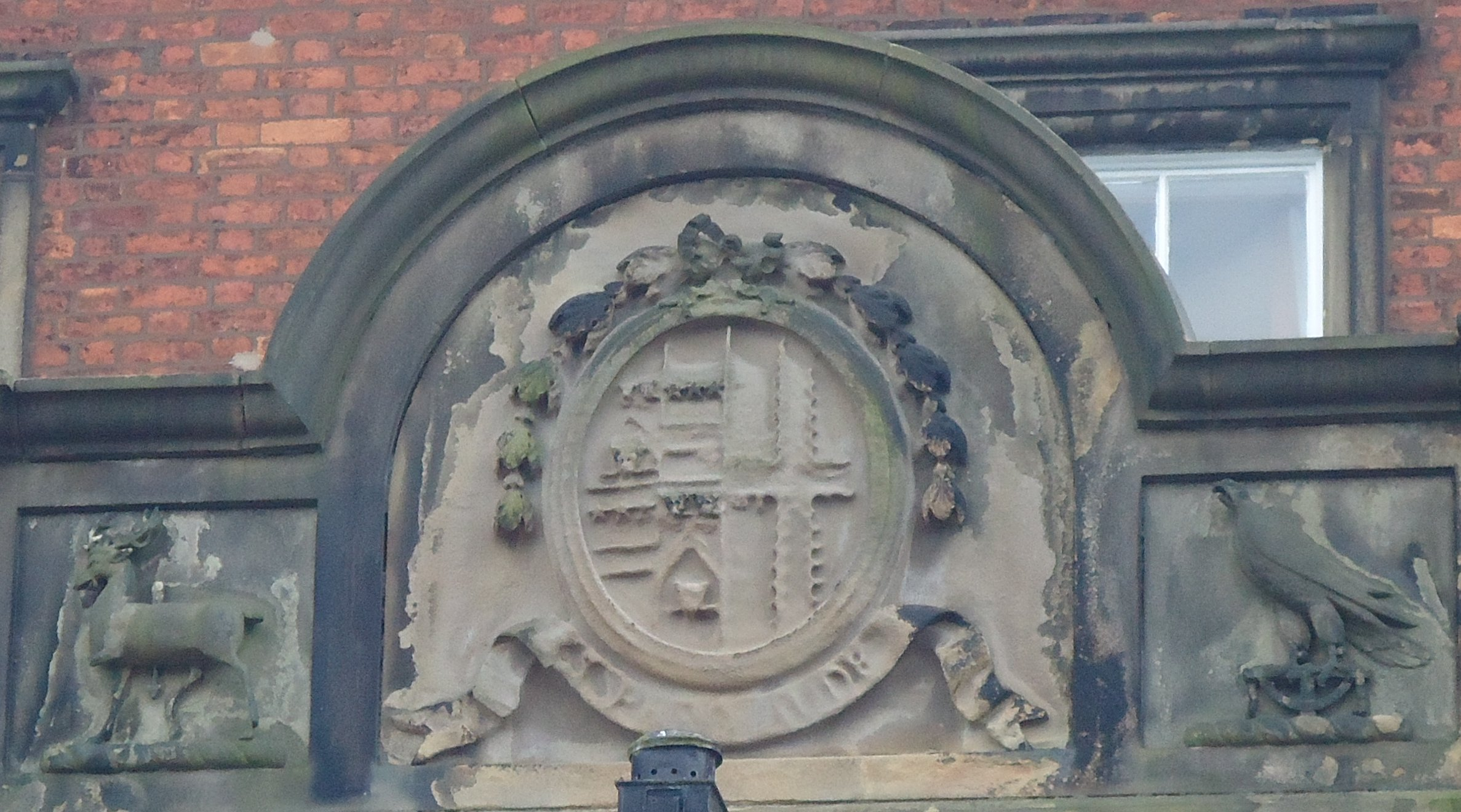
The parapet above the front door - a carved stone coat of arms flanked by a carved stag and a hawk. The arms feature Parker quartering Towneley and impaling Brooke (in 1816 Robert Towneley-Parker (1793–1879) married Harriet Brooke (1798–1878), daughter of Thomas Brooke of Church Minshall, Cheshire).

In the years 1816 to 1819, Robert Townley Parker inherited the estate from his father. He went on to remodel the hall with designs from Lewis Wyatt which incorporated an extension to the east wing.

After the death of Capt. Robert Townley Parker and his brother Thomas Towneley Parker, the estate passed to their nephew Reginald Arthur Tatton who re-designed the gardens, introducing a pergola and gazebo, a walled garden and pond. During the First World War, Tatton adapted the hall for use as an infirmary for troops. Between 1 May 1915 and 8 June 1917, it was known as Cuerden Hall Auxiliary Hospital.

The drawing rooms were turned into wards and furnished with beds and equipment, whilst the parkland and gardens provided an outdoor area for the soldiers. There were also trips to the Tatton family's other house nearby, Astley Hall. An album filled with photographs, letters and news cuttings that tell this particular story in Cuerden Hall's history was recently offered for sale.

During the Second World War, the estate was requisitioned by the Ministry of Defence and converted into an Army Education Centre and later became the British Army Divisional Headquarters (number four of five) of the Anti-Aircraft Command. By the late 1950s, the hall had been in use by the Army intermittently for a number of years and in 1958 it was finally sold by the Tatton family to the Ministry of Defence and in 1967, became the Army's Headquarters for the North West District.

In 1977 the Central Lancashire Development Corporation gained control of Cuerden Hall and the surrounding parkland from the Ministry of Defence and began constructing offices and car parks that are still used by the park's operators today. By 1978 the parkland and wider estate had been developed into Cuerden Valley Park.

In 1985 the hall became a Sue Ryder Care Home. In 2020 the hall was sold and is being restored as a family home by Manchester businessman Colin Shenton. During renovations an old ice-house was rediscovered on the property by the lake.

== Gallery ==
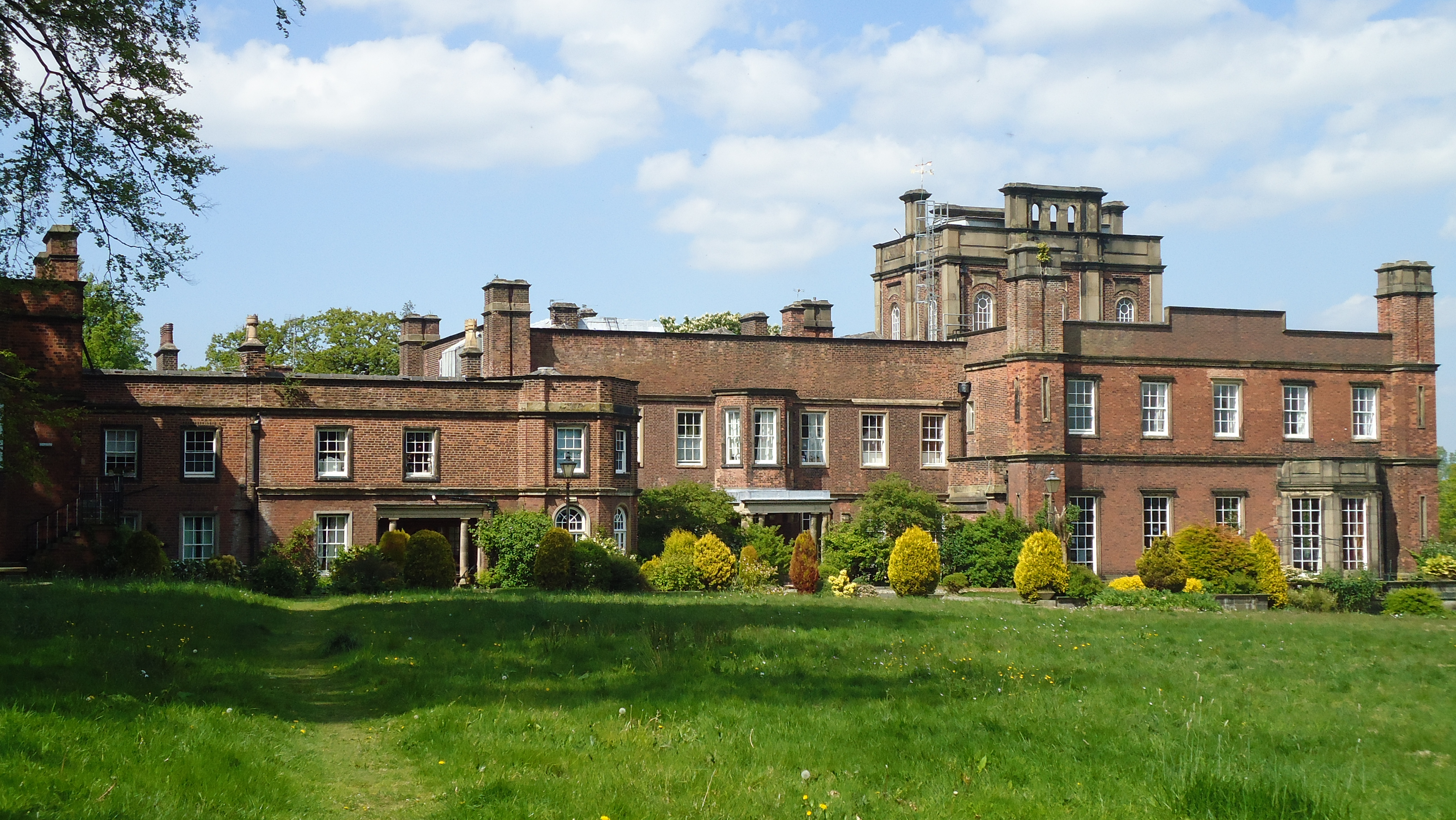
The southern range and garden front; on the left is the stable court (mostly out of picture) occupying the west third of the building, the central third (on the left in this picture) being the original 18th century house of simple rectangular double pile plan, and the east wing on the right is Lewis Wyatt's substantial extension, constructed between 1816 and 1819.

== See also ==
- Grade II* listed buildings in Lancashire
- Listed buildings in Cuerden
