= Listed buildings in Cuerden =

Cuerden is a civil parish in the Borough of Chorley, Lancashire, England. The parish contains four buildings that are recorded in the National Heritage List for England as designated listed buildings. Of these, one is listed at Grade II*, the middle grade, and the others are at Grade II, the lowest grade. The major building in the parish is Cuerden Hall; this and two structures associated with it are listed. The other listed building is a farmhouse.

== Key ==
Grade	Criteria
II*	Particularly important buildings of more than special interest
II	Buildings of national importance and special interest

== Buildings ==
Name and location	Photograph	Date	Notes	Grade
Clock House Farmhouse; 53.70893°N 2.66889°W		16th century (or earlier)	The farmhouse is in rendered brick with slate roofs. It has two storeys and a T-shaped plan, consisting of a two-bay main range and a two-bay service wing at the rear. On the front is a single-storey porch, and all the windows have been altered.	II
Cuerden Hall; 53.7101°N 2.6617°W		c. 1717	A country house that was extended in 1816–19 by Lewis Wyatt, further extended in the 20th century, subsequently used as a care home. It is in brick with stone dressings, with two storeys, and an irregular plan. The features include a stone seven-bay porch with pilasters, a taller square block with sides of five bays and corner chimneys appearing like turrets, a stair tower rising as a belvedere, and bay windows, all the other windows being sashes.	II*
Iron gates, Cuerden Hall; 53.71036°N 2.66092°W		1817 (possible)	The iron gates are at the foot of the terrace to the east of the hall, and were possibly designed by Lewis Wyatt. They consist of two openwork iron pillars, with railings and stone piers outside them, and decorative gates between them. On the gates and the pillars are urn finials.	II
Stable block, Cuerden Hall; 53.71011°N 2.66257°W	—	Early 19th century	The former stable block, later used as offices, is in brick with stone dressings and stone-slate roofs. It has two storeys and three ranges, forming a U-shaped plan. The north range contains entrance arches, a clock face, a hexagonal bellcote with an ogee cap, and a ramped stone parapet incorporating a carved shield. On the outside of the east range are tall windows, and on the courtyard side is an iron and glass roof on cast iron Corinthian columns. In the south range are wagon entrances.	II
