= James de Lostock =

Founder of Lostock Hall

- 1893 map of Lostock Hall
- Born: Early 14th Century
- Died: Mid to late 14th Century
- Years active: 1332-1350
- Known for: Foundation of Lostock's Hall
- Children: Magote (Margery)

James de Lostock was an historical figure and land owner in the 14th century, who is accredited to founding the modern day settlement of Lostock Hall, by inheriting 'Lostock's Hall', a manor located in the parish of Walton-le-Dale. The site of the original Hall eventually became the grounds of St Catherine's Hospice.

== Etymology ==
The surname 'de Lostock' refers to someone who resides on the River Lostock. Lostock could primarily be a settlement name (see Lostock Hall) and may, like other similar names in Lancashire, be derived from Old English hlōse-, meaning "a pig-sty", and -stoc, "a place, secondary settlement". The name could also be a Brittonic hydronym, derived from lost, chiefly (perhaps metaphorically) meaning "a tail" (Welsh llost). This is suffixed with the nominal suffix -ǭg. A derivative of the aforementioned lost, *lostǭg, perhaps meaning "a beaver" (though note Cornish lostek, "fox") could also underlie the name.

== Biography ==
=== Early figures of the family ===
An earlier James de Lostock built the original Lostock Hall and resided there in 1212; owned by the family during the time of Edward II, it passed down to James de Lostock when he inherited the estate on the River Lostock.

=== His life ===
In 1332, Lostock paid 3s towards a subsidy levied on principle freeholders of the area. In 1334, James de Lostock, among others were accused by the Abbot of Evesham, William Chiriton that they had taken 100 acres of land from him. In 1347, Lostock complained that Robert de Langton the younger, their brother John Langton, and others had taken by force a mill of his in Cuerden; the verdict was given against them.

=== Lostock Hall ===
Lostock Hall was originally called Cuerden Green; following its construction it descended to James de Lostock during the reign of Edward II. After his death, Lostock's daughter Magote (otherwise Margery), inherited her father's lands and renamed it as Lostock Hall. On 9 December 1369, Margery owed 100 marks to Henry de Walton with it being resolved on 24 June 1370. She later married into the Banastre (or Bannister) family, carrying with her the Lostock estate, as there is a John Banastre of Lostock between 1402 and 1429. In 1548, the Fleetwood family gained control of the property with it being sold by William Fleetwood to Roger Burscough in 1590; during the sale, Lostock Hall was referred to as the free fishery in Lostock water. Roger's son Peter Burscough inhabited it between 1611 and 1616 before Andrew Dandy (or Dandie) held it in 1662, having paid 12d to the Lord of Clitheroe for these lands.

William Yates's 1786 map of Lostock Hall

Andrew Dandy and later his son William inhabited the hall until William's death in 1676. In the early 1700s, the original hall was destroyed by a fire, with some of the original brickwork used to make a new building in 1764 by William Clayton Esq. Following William's death it passed to his son George who lived there until his death in 1829; it then passed to George's son William who lived there before moving to the south in the late 1840s.

A 1848 map of the now demolished Lostock Hall and its surrounding areas.

Following owners included Robert Orrell Esq. (cotton spinner and manufacturer of Cuerden Mills) between 1847 and 1861; John Bashall Esq. (cotton manufacturer), between 1861 and 1871 and Robert Jackson between 1871 and 1881. The property was purchased by Harry Dewhurst in the early 1880s and he resided there until moving to Cheshire in 1918; when he did this the lands were given to the Preston Royal Infirmary so that it could be used as a type of hospital, work began by June 1922.

The lands that once were Lostock Hall were redeveloped in the 1980s to become St Catherine's Hospice.
