= Abbeyfield School, Chippenham =

School in England

Abbeyfield School
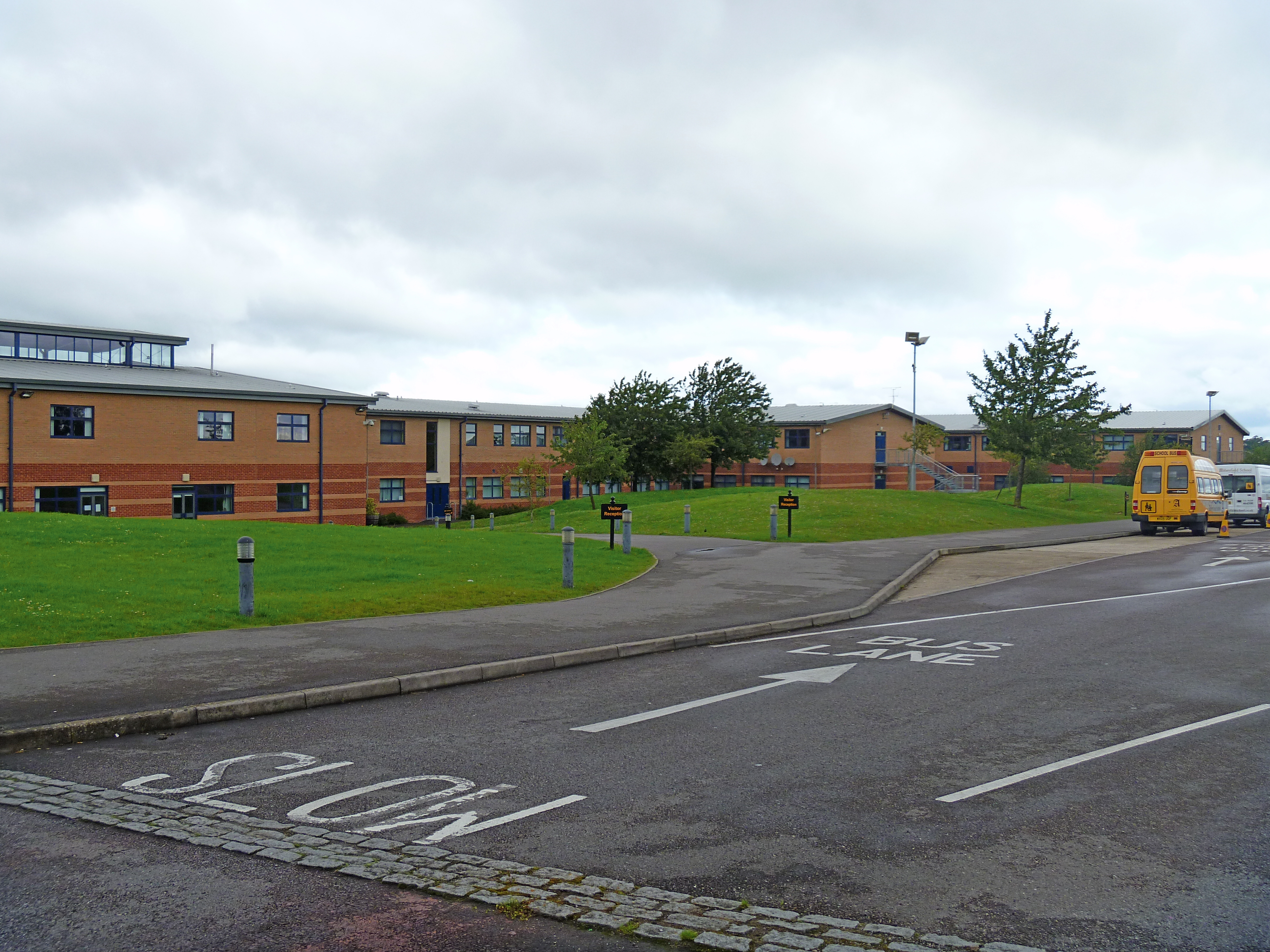

Location
- Stanley Lane; Chippenham, Wiltshire, SN15 3XB; England; 51°27′07″N 2°05′34″W

Information
- Type: Community school
- Established: December 2001
- Local authority: Wiltshire Council
- Department for Education URN: 131969 Tables
- Ofsted: Reports
- Headteacher: Nick Norgrove
- Gender: Coeducational
- Age: 11 to 18
- Enrolment: 883 (May 2023)
- Houses: Elizabeth; Brunel; Wilson; Talbot
- Website: www.abbeyfield.wilts.sch.uk

Abbeyfield School is a coeducational secondary school and sixth form in Chippenham, Wiltshire, England.

== History ==
The school was built to serve the needs of the expanding population of Chippenham, in particular the large Pewsham and Cepen Park estates. In 1998, while the site was being cleared, two unexploded bombs were found on the site and the Army carried out a controlled explosion. Other delays occurred due to the nature of the Private Finance Initiative and building did not start until 2000.

The new school was officially opened in December 2001 by The Duke of Edinburgh. Abbeyfield achieved Business and Enterprise Specialist School status in September 2005. In 2008, a new building was built to accommodate the growing sixth form.

Many changes were implemented after James Fox became headteacher in 2010, including a new uniform which featured blazers. Four houses were introduced, named after local and historical dignitaries: Alfred, Neeld, Brunel and Talbot.

== Location ==
The school is on the east side of Chippenham in Stanley Lane, near the Pewsham estate, off London Road and surrounded by fields. It is set in over 27 acres of landscaped grounds, playing fields, tennis courts and playgrounds.

== Admissions ==
Each year the school admits children – up to 180 in 2019 – from local primary schools. These children come from the Chippenham area (which is also served by Hardenhuish and Sheldon academies) as well as from surrounding towns such as Calne, Melksham and Corsham.

Wiltshire Council's school places strategy for 2017–2022 identified a need for "significant expansion" of the school, at a date to be determined.

== List of headteachers ==
- 2001 – Patricia Shubrook
- 2010 – James Fox
- 2011 – David Nicholson
- 2014 – Ian Tucker
- 2019 – Nick Norgrove and Ralph Plummer (co-headteachers)
- 2020 – Nick Norgrove

== Ofsted ==
Ofsted inspection assessments include:

- 2002: "A very effective school, it has the capacity to improve even further"
- 2006: "An effective school which provides a good quality of education for its students who enjoy their learning and achieve well"
- 2009: the report was not as positive, being only "satisfactory"
- 2012: Good
- 2017: Good
- 2022: Good

== Link with the Gambia ==
Since 2006, Abbeyfield School has been twinned with Maahad School in The Gambia. It is traditional every year for Year 12 and 13 students to travel to the Gambia to visit the school, help with lessons and spend time with local people. jole rider, an education organisation and registered charity, worked with Abbeyfield to supply refurbished, donated second-hand bicycles and classroom equipment to the school, to help young Gambians gain an education as many live far from the school and need transport in order to get there.

== UK Aerospace Youth Rocketry Challenge ==
Since 2010, Abbeyfield School had taken part in the UKAYRoC competition. In the first year only one team was entered. The team passed qualification flights and proceeded to the finals, finally coming 9th overall. The following year, two teams were entered, Quantum and Enigma. Both teams made it to the final, but Enigma suffered from an engine misfire, and only came 15th. Quantum, had a successful launch, and came 5th overall. In 2012, three teams were entered Enigma, Quantum and Omega. Both Omega and Enigma qualified for the UK finals with both teams managing successful launches that placed them in 3rd and 4th positions respectively. All three teams made it to the 2013 finals. In 2015 a team from the school came second, and in 2016 one team came second and one won first overall. The team that came first in the UK finals then went on to finish second in the world final at the Farnborough International Airshow, losing to the US team.
