= John Eggleston (professor) =

English educationist and publisher

- Born: Samuel John Eggleston; 11 November 1926; Dorchester, Dorset, England
- Died: 12 December 2001 (aged 75); Stratford-upon-Avon, Warwickshire, England
- Spouse: Greta Patrick (m. 1957–2001)
- Children: 4 (two sons and two daughters)

Academic background
- Education: Chippenham Grammar School; London School of Economics; UCL Institute of Education

Academic work
- Discipline: Educationist
- Institutions: Loughborough College of Education; Leicester University; Keele University; University of Warwick

Samuel John Eggleston (11 November 1926 – 12 December 2001) was an English educationist and publisher. He was a professor and head of the Department of Education at Keele University from 1967 to 1984. He was a professor of education at the University of Warwick from 1985 to 1996, and he chaired the Department of Education there from 1985 to 1991. In 1983, he and Gillian Klein co-founded Trentham Books. He was the founding editor-in-chief of the peer-reviewed academic journal Mentoring & Tutoring: Partnership in Learning.
