= Westminster paedophile dossier =

Document describing alleged child abuse

A dossier on paedophiles allegedly associated with the British government was assembled by British Member of Parliament Geoffrey Dickens, who handed it to the then-Home Secretary, Leon Brittan, in 1984. The whereabouts of the dossier are unknown, along with other files on organised child abuse that had been held by the Home Office.

In 2013, the Home Office stated that all relevant information had been passed to the police, and that Dickens' dossier had not been retained. It was later disclosed that 114 documents concerning child abuse allegations were missing. In July 2014, the Labour Party called for a new inquiry into the way that the allegations had been handled, and the Prime Minister, David Cameron, ordered the permanent secretary of the Home Office, Mark Sedwill, to investigate the circumstances of the lost dossier.

On 7 July 2014, the Home Secretary, Theresa May, announced a review into the handling of historic child abuse allegations, to be led by Peter Wanless, chief executive of the NSPCC, and the establishment of a public panel inquiry into the duty of care taken in the protection of children from paedophiles by British public institutions, led by an independent panel of experts and chaired by Baroness Butler-Sloss. Butler-Sloss later stood down as chair of the inquiry. On 5 September 2014, it was announced that it would instead be chaired by Fiona Woolf but on 31 October 2014 she, too, resigned from the role. On 4 February 2015 it was announced that the inquiry would be chaired by Justice Lowell Goddard, a New Zealand High Court judge. The existing panel would be disbanded, and the inquiry would be given new powers, becoming the Independent Inquiry into Child Sexual Abuse. On 4 August 2016, she also resigned from the role.

== Background ==
Between 1981 and 1985 Dickens campaigned against a suspected paedophile ring he claimed to have uncovered that was connected to trading child pornography. In 1981, Dickens in the House of Commons accused Sir Peter Hayman, the former senior diplomat, civil servant and MI6 operative, of being a paedophile, using parliamentary privilege. Dickens further questioned why Hayman had not been jailed after it was discovered he had left a package containing child pornography on a bus.

In 1983, Dickens claimed there was a paedophile network involving "big, big names – people in positions of power, influence and responsibility" and threatened to name them in the Commons. The next year, he campaigned for the banning of the pro-paedophile activism group of which Hayman was a member, the Paedophile Information Exchange.

On 29 November 1985, Dickens said in a speech to the Commons that paedophiles were "evil and dangerous" and that child pornography generated "vast sums". He further claimed that: "The noose around my neck grew tighter after I named a former high-flying British diplomat [Hayman] on the Floor of the House. Honourable Members will understand that where big money is involved and as important names came into my possession so the threats began. First, I received threatening telephone calls followed by two burglaries at my London home. Then, more seriously, my name appeared on a multi-killer's hit list".

== Dossier ==
Dickens gave his 40-page dossier to the Home Secretary, Leon Brittan, in a 30-minute meeting in 1984. A second copy of the dossier was reported to have been given to the Director of Public Prosecutions, Thomas Hetherington.

Dickens described the dossier as having the potential to "blow the lid off" the lives of notable child abusers. It included details on eight prominent figures, and was reported to have contained the name of a former Conservative MP who had been found with child pornography videos, against whom no arrests or charges were brought. Dickens told his son, Barry, that the dossier was "explosive".

Dickens had asked Brittan in 1983 to investigate the diplomatic and civil services and the royal court at Buckingham Palace over claims of child sexual abuse. Dickens said that he was "going to give him [Brittan] a glimpse inside my private files, where people have written to me with information."

== Aftermath ==
It was subsequently suggested by Brittan in a letter to Dickens that his file would be given to police; however, the police later stated they had no record of any investigation into the allegations. The Home Office confirmed that no correspondence from Dickens had been retained and that they had found "no record of specific allegations by Mr Dickens of child sex abuse by prominent public figures". Brittan has said that the dossier was passed to officials at the Home Office, and that he had raised concerns about the allegations with the director of public prosecutions.

In a detailed statement issued in July 2014, Brittan said allegations that he "failed to deal adequately with the bundle of papers containing allegations of serious sexual impropriety" from Dickens were "completely without foundation". Brittan said that he had passed the dossier to "the relevant Home Office officials for examination, as was the normal and correct practice" adding that "I wrote to Mr Dickens on 20 March 1984 informing him of the conclusions of the Director of Public Prosecutions about these matters (as set out in the Interim Report of the Independent Review set up by the Home Office)." However in an article in The Times, journalist James Gillespie quoted a letter from Dickens to Brittan in which he thanked him for his "splendid support" in the matter. He also quoted examples of the contents of the dossier including a woman complaining her 16-year-old son had become homosexual after working in Buckingham Palace Kitchens and a civil servant advocating that those caught by Customs and Excise importing child pornography should be referred to the police.

Barry Dickens has said of the dossier that he would like Brittan to "name the very next person he handed it on to", adding "And where did it end up? There must have been a person who was the last to handle it ... My father thought that the dossier at the time was the most powerful thing that had ever been produced, with the names that were involved and the power that they had." Barry Dickens also said that his father's flat in London and his constituency home were subsequently broken into and ransacked the same week that the dossier was handed over, but nothing was taken. Dickens said that "They weren't burglaries. ... They were break-ins for a reason. We can only presume they were after something that dad had that they wanted."

Simon Danczuk MP, who has investigated claims of abuse by the former MP Cyril Smith, has said that there is "no reason" why the dossiers would have been destroyed by the Home Office. Danczuk has alleged that before his appearance at the Home Affairs Select Committee where he was to answer questions on child abuse, he was urged by a Conservative minister not to challenge Brittan over his knowledge of an alleged paedophile ring at Westminster. Danczuk said of the encounter that "I'd never spoken to him before in my life but he blocked my way and ushered me to one side ... He warned me to think very carefully about what I was going to say the next day." The minister told Danczuk, "I hear you're about to challenge Lord Brittan about when he knew about child sex abuse ... It wouldn't be a wise move ... It was all put to bed a long time ago." The minister also warned Danczuk that he could be responsible for Brittan's death.

The Labour MP Tom Watson asked the Home Office in February 2013 for Dickens' dossier. A Home Office review in 2013 concluded that any information requiring investigation was referred to the police but revealed that Mr Dickens' dossier was "not retained".

The missing dossier has been linked with ongoing investigations into the Elm Guest House child abuse scandal. Hayman was among visitors to the Elm Guest House. Other prominent people who allegedly visited the house included the Liberal MP Cyril Smith, the art historian and Soviet spy Anthony Blunt, a Sinn Féin politician, several Conservative politicians, and a Labour MP.

In January 2015, an academic researcher found in The National Archives a reference to a file entitled "Allegations against former public [missing word] of unnatural sexual proclivities; security aspects 1980 Oct 27 – 1981 Mar 20". which had gone to the then Prime Minister Margaret Thatcher in the early 1980s. The file had been classified, since it contained information from the security services and Law Officers. The Cabinet Office initially stated that any pertinent files would be made available to the forthcoming Independent Panel Inquiry into Child Sexual Abuse. However, on 30 January the file was made public, revealing that it related to the former British diplomat Sir Peter Hayman. In February 2015 The Guardian reported that Thatcher had added handwritten annotations to the documents in the file which showed that despite its contents she had been insistent that officials should not name Hayman. The released papers also contained a note titled "Line to take" sent to Thatcher on the day after Geoffrey Dickens had used parliamentary privilege to name Hayman in 1981; on it she had written: "Say authorities have carried out an investigation. Nothing to suggest that security prejudiced".

== Response ==
In a 2013 review on its handling of the dossier, the Home Office discovered that parts of the dossier described as "credible" and which contained "realistic potential" for further investigation were passed to prosecutors and the police. Other elements of the dossier were not retained or were destroyed. A letter was found from Brittan to Dickens which stated that the allegations contained in the dossier had been acted on.

It was discovered in 2013 that 114 documents that also concerned child abuse allegations were missing from the Home Office's records. The 114 missing documents were identified after an independent review was conducted into information received by the department about organised child sex abuse. The government has declined to publish the 2013 review, with a spokesperson saying that "My understanding is that the executive summary reflects very fully the report ... If there are allegations, evidence of wrongdoing that people have they should bring that to the attention of the relevant authorities including the police." The former Director of Public Prosecutions, Ken Macdonald, said the circumstances in which the dossier had gone missing was alarming and recommended an inquiry into the fate of the dossier. The Labour Party has called for a new inquiry into the way that the dossier's allegations were handled, claiming that the previous investigation was conducted in four weeks, with just two officials.

The permanent secretary of the Home Office, Mark Sedwill, was ordered to investigate the circumstances of the lost dossier by the Prime Minister, David Cameron, in July 2014. Sedwill had told the Prime Minister that an independent legal figure would assess whether the conclusions of the Home Office's 2013 review "remain sound". Sedwill had already informed Keith Vaz, the chair of the Home Affairs Select Committee, that the Home Office had found "no evidence of the inappropriate removal or destruction of material". Vaz had also written to the Home Office's most senior civil servant to ask questions about its 2013 review. Danczuk described Cameron's ordering of the new inquiry as representing "little more than a damage limitation exercise. It doesn't go far enough. The public has lost confidence in these kind of official reviews, which usually result in a whitewash. The only way to get to the bottom of this is a thorough public inquiry."

In July 2014, Norman Tebbit, who had held a variety of ministerial posts in the 1980s, when asked if there had been a "big political cover-up", said that "there may well have been", describing it as "almost unconscious. It was the thing that people did at that time." Tebbit also spoke of the political atmosphere of the time, saying that "At that time I think most people would have thought that the establishment, the system, was to be protected and if a few things had gone wrong here and there that it was more important to protect the system than to delve too far into it ... That view, I think, was wrong then and it is spectacularly shown to be wrong because the abuses have grown."

On 7 July 2014, the Home Secretary, Theresa May, announced that a more thorough review of historic child abuse allegations would be carried out by Peter Wanless, chief executive of the NSPCC, assisted by a senior legal figure. This would cover how police and prosecutors handled information given to them, and was expected to report by the end of September. She said:

I want to address two important public concerns: first that in the 1980s the Home Office failed to act on allegations of child sex abuse and second, that public bodies and other important institutions have failed to take seriously their duty of care towards children.

In addition, a "Hillsborough-style" inquiry, the Independent Panel Inquiry into Child Sexual Abuse, would be held, led by a panel of legal and child protection experts. This would be wide-ranging, would not report before the next election, and could be converted into a full public inquiry if necessary. For Labour, Yvette Cooper welcomed the announcements. On 8 July it was announced that the wide-ranging review would be chaired by Baroness Butler-Sloss, but she stood down on 14 July after mounting pressure from victims' groups and MPs over her suitability regarding the fact that her brother was the Attorney General at the time of some of the abuses in question. In October 2014, her replacement, Fiona Woolf, also stood down after concerns were raised over her connections with involved parties, including Lord Brittan.

=== Wanless Inquiry report ===
On 11 November 2014, Peter Wanless and Richard Whittam QC published their findings into the disappearance of the Home Office files, saying that they had "found nothing to support a concern that files had been deliberately or systematically removed or destroyed to cover up organised child abuse". They also reported that they had found no evidence to support allegations that the Paedophile Information Exchange had been funded by the Home Office. However, their report acknowledged that Home Office filing procedures had created "significant limitations ... It is, therefore, not possible to say whether files were ever removed or destroyed to cover up or hide allegations of organised or systematic child abuse by particular individuals because of the systems then in place".

Responding to the report, Home Secretary Theresa May told Parliament that it had returned a verdict of "not proven", saying: "There might have been a cover-up. I cannot stand here and say the Home Office was not involved in a cover-up in the 1980s and that is why I am determined to get to the truth of this". She therefore asked Wanless to further investigate whether any material relevant to his review had been passed to the security services, and if so what action had subsequently been taken by them. She also requested that he look into how police and prosecutors had handled any allegations of child abuse passed onto them by the Home Office at the time of Geoffrey Dickens' dossier. In addition, May informed Parliament that the Metropolitan Police would investigate claims made by journalist Don Hale that Special Branch officers had seized a file containing allegations about MPs and other prominent figures which former Labour Party minister Barbara Castle had given to him.

=== IPCC investigation ===
In March 2015, it was announced that the Independent Police Complaints Commission (IPCC) would "manage" an investigation that was already being conducted by the London Metropolitan Police's Directorate of Professional Standards into claims of "high-level corruption of the most serious nature" over four decades, including 16 allegations that the Met had covered up historical child sex offences because of the involvement of MPs and police officers. Scotland Yard said it had voluntarily referred the allegations, which arose from investigation 'Operation Fairbank' launched in 2012, to the IPCC. The allegations being considered by the IPCC relate to the period between 1970 and 2005 and include failures to properly investigate child sex abuse offences; the halting of an investigation relating to the abuse of young men in Dolphin Square, near Westminster because "officers were too near prominent people"; and that a Houses of Parliament document was found at a paedophile's address which linked "highly-prominent individuals" – including MPs and senior police officers – to a paedophile ring, but that no further action was taken.

The IPCC would also consider claims that a child sex abuse victim's account was altered to remove the name of a senior politician, and that surveillance of a child abuse ring was curtailed because of "high-profile people being involved". Shadow home secretary Yvette Cooper said: "Given the gravity of the crimes being investigated, it is worrying that this is not a fully independent investigation. Instead the Met will lead this work with oversight from the IPCC. Surely this should be done by an independent investigator or, at the very least an alternate force".

However, Labour MP Simon Danczuk, who had been calling for such an inquiry, told the BBC: "We are on the cusp of finding out exactly what went on in the 70s and 1980s and, I'm sorry to say, I think it will be shown that senior politicians were involved in abuse and there was a cover up. I think that's inevitable now". The BBC also reported that former Daily Mirror crime correspondent Jeff Edwards, who stated he was told by a detective in the 1980s that an investigation into paedophiles was closed on the orders of a senior politician, had recently been contacted by the police. He told the BBC: "I think this was a cynical cover up. There was no doubt in their minds the way they would deal with this was simply to expunge it from the record. As far as they were concerned they could make it go away forever".

In December 2015, Danczuk's membership of the Labour Party was suspended following reports he had exchanged explicit messages with a 17-year-old girl.

== See also ==
- Rotherham child sexual exploitation scandal
- Franklin child prostitution ring allegations
- Elm Guest House claims and controversy
