= Peter Wanless =

British businessman (born 1964)

Sir Peter Wanless CB

Chief Executive Officer of the NSPCC
- In office June 2013 – December 2024

Chief Executive Officer of the Big Lottery Fund
- In office February 2008 – May 2013

Personal details
- Born: Peter Thomas Wanless; 25 September 1964 (age 61)
- Education: Sheldon School
- Alma mater: University of Leeds; INSEAD
- Awards: Companion of the Order of the Bath (2007)

Sir Peter Thomas Wanless, CB (born 25 September 1964) is an English executive and former civil servant. From 2013 until 2024, he was the chief executive officer of the National Society for the Prevention of Cruelty to Children (NSPCC). In June 2022, he was appointed President of Somerset County Cricket Club. In July 2014, he was appointed by the British government to head a review into historical sex abuse claims. He is the chair of 5Rights Foundation, an organisation established by Baroness Beeban Kidron to promote the rights of children online.

== Early life ==
Wanless was born on 25 September 1964. He was educated at Sheldon School, then a comprehensive school in Chippenham, Wiltshire. He then studied International History and Politics at the University of Leeds, graduating with a BA degree in 1986. He has since studied on the Advanced Management Programme at Insead.

== Career ==
After joining the Civil Service, he held a variety of posts at the HM Treasury, including Head of Private Finance Policy, and Principal Private Secretary to three Cabinet Ministers. including Michael Portillo, both when Portillo was Chief Secretary to the Treasury and later as Secretary of State for Employment. Wanless later held senior positions within the Department for Education and Skills and its successor the Department for Children, Schools and Families, including Director of School Performance and Reform and Director of Strategy and Communications.

Wanless was CEO of the Big Lottery Fund between February 2008 and May 2013. Since June 2013, he has been the chief executive officer of the National Society for the Prevention of Cruelty to Children (NSPCC). He was a non-executive director of The Kemnal Academies Trust (TKAT), which operates academy schools in South East England. He is currently a Trustee of the 5Rights Foundation and a member of the advisory board of the UK Government's National Leadership Centre.

On April 9, 2024 Wanless announced he will be stepping down as NSPCC Chief Executive after 11 years. On June 20, 2025, Wanless became the chair of 5Rights Foundation.

=== Wanless Inquiry ===
In July 2014, Home Secretary Theresa May announced that he would be leading a review into historical sex abuse claims. His report, written with Richard Whittam QC, was published in November 2014. It "found nothing to support a concern that files had been deliberately or systematically removed or destroyed to cover up organised child abuse", but also said that it was "not possible to say whether files were ever removed or destroyed to cover up or hide allegations of organised or systematic child abuse by particular individuals because of the systems then in place".

== Personal life ==
Married with one son, the family live in Seal, Kent. Wanless is a lifelong supporter of Somerset County Cricket Club where he serves on the committee. He describes himself as a "fan of jangly guitars, indie pop, Somerset cricket, Borgen....". In June 2022, Wanless was appointed President of Somerset County Cricket Club.

== Honours ==
Wanless was appointed Companion of the Order of the Bath (CB) in the 2007 New Year Honours for his role as Director of School Performance and Reform in the Department for Education and Skills. He was knighted in the 2021 New Year Honours for services to children, young people and the charitable sector.
