= Shipston High School =

Location
- Darlingscote Road; Shipston-on-Stour, Warwickshire, CV36 4DY; England
- Coordinates: 52.065278°N 1.633333°W

Information
- Type: Academy
- Local authority: Warwickshire County Council
- Department for Education URN: 138767 Tables
- Ofsted: Reports
- Gender: Coeducational
- Age: 11 to 16
- Houses: Badger, Mayo, Sheldon, Hart
- Colours: purple, Cyan, Red, Green
- Website: http://www.shipstonhigh.co.uk

Shipston High School is a coeducational secondary school with academy status in Shipston-on-Stour in Warwickshire, England. It is situated in the North West of the town and has strong links with the community. In recent years it has been greatly oversubscribed for its new year 7 intake and was the 4th most improved school in the country a few years ago. Shipston High School is a small school, only having around 500 students, but proves strong competition for other schools. Shipston High achieves greatly in sports and extra curricular activities such as public speaking. The school was previously well known for its technology-related activities, such as rocketry and RC car racing, but this has been halted for several years. It also had Specialist Technology Status, however schools no longer use specialist status.

== Controversies ==
- In 2016 Jonathan Hunt, a former science teacher at Shipston High School, was jailed for having a sexual relationship with a 15 year old student.
- In 2020 a former rugby coach at the school was jailed after his wife discovered inappropriate images of female students on his computer.
