= Lostock Hall Academy =

Location
- Todd Lane North; Lostock Hall; Lancashire, PR5 5UR; England
- 53.73007°N 2.68134°W

Information
- Type: Academy
- Motto: Educating the Future
- Local authority: Lancashire
- Department for Education URN: 137111 Tables
- Ofsted: Reports
- Headteacher: Julie Butterworth
- Gender: Mixed
- Age: 11 to 16
- Website: http://www.lostockhallacademy.org/

Lostock Hall Academy (formerly Lostock Hall Community High School) is a mixed secondary school located in Lostock Hall in the English county of Lancashire.

Previously a community school administered by Lancashire County Council, Lostock Hall Community High School converted to academy status on 1 August 2011 and was renamed Lostock Hall Academy. However, the school continues to coordinate with Lancashire County Council for admissions.

Lostock Hall Academy offers GCSEs and vocational courses as programmes of study for pupils. The school also operates a leisure centre which offers various sports facilities for community use outside school hours.

== Notable former staff ==
- Ray Honeyford, English headmaster, writer and critic of multiculturalism.

== Notable former pupils ==
- Tim Farron, Former leader of the Liberal Democrats and MP for Westmorland and Lonsdale
