= Lostock Hall =

Village in Lancashire, England

Coordinates: 53.725°N 2.688°W

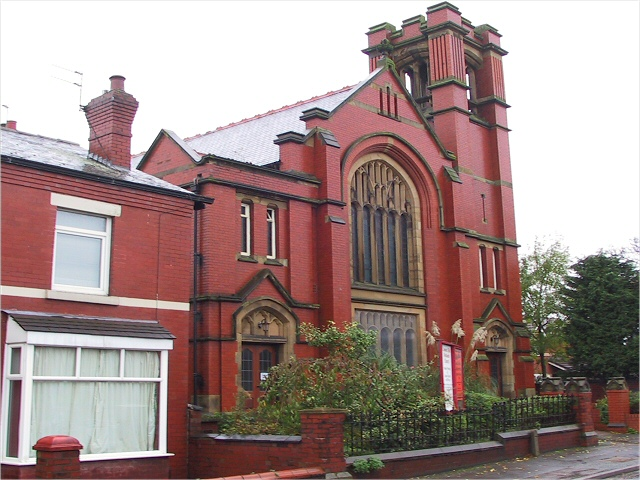
- Methodist church, Lostock Hall

- Shown within South Ribble Location within Lancashire
- Population: 6,138 (UK Office for National Statistics, 2021)
- OS grid reference: SD546257
  - London: 188 mi (303 km) SE
- District: South Ribble
- Shire county: Lancashire
- Region: North West
- Country: England
- Sovereign state: United Kingdom
- Post town: Preston
- Postcode district: PR5
- Dialling code: 01772
- Police: Lancashire
- Fire: Lancashire
- Ambulance: North West
- UK Parliament: Ribble Valley

Lostock Hall /ˌlɒstɒk ˈhɔːl/ is a suburban village within the South Ribble borough of Lancashire, England. It is located on the south side of the River Ribble, some 3 miles (4.8 km) south of Preston and 3 miles (5 km) north of Leyland. It is bordered on its southeastern side by the interchange for the M6, M61 and M65 motorways.

Lostock Hall traces its origins to James de Lostock who in 1212 built Lostock's Hall in the then rural area of Cuerden Green in the township of Walton-le-Dale. A settlement expanded outwards from Lostock's Hall, taking its name from the Hall. The former separate community of Tardy Gate is now for all intents and purposes a part of Lostock Hall - it used to be the farming community linking one part of rural Lancashire to another.

== History ==
=== Early history ===
The estate of Lostock's Hall in the rural area of Cuerden Green was built by James de Lostock. The grounds which surrounded Lostock's Hall got renamed as Lostock Hall after the death of James, by his daughter Magote.

A 1848 map of the now demolished Lostock Hall and its surrounding areas.

In 1662 Andrew Dandy paid a rent of 12d to the lord of Clitheroe for his lands called Lostock, and in 1666 William Dandy paid tax upon three hearths here. He died in 1676. Andrew Dandy and William, his son, were out-burgesses at Preston guild in 1682. To this day, a small section of the River Lostock, is known by locals as "Dandy Brook", in honour of the Dandys.

Lostock's Hall was destroyed by a fire. Some of the main brick work not affected by the fire were reused in 1764, to form structure of a new building on the original site, as part of a regeneration project by William Clayton Esq. William's son, George Clayton inherited the hall following the death of William Clayton. George went on to living in the hall for many years with his wife Dolly, until he died in 1829, at the age of 86. George's second son, William became the new inheritor of the property, until he relocated to the South of England in the late 1840s. The trend of inheriting the hall continued for many years through such owners as Robert Orrell Esq. (cotton spinner and manufacturer, Cuerden Mills) 1847-61; John Bashall Esq. (cotton manufacturer, Lostock Hall), 1861–71 and Robert Jackson 1871-81.

=== Modern history ===
A 1893 map of the now demolished Lostock Hall.

The trend of inheriting the hall ceased, when the founders of the a cotton thread works, purchased the property in the early 1880s by Harry Dewhurt; who remained living there until 1918, when he relocated to Cheshire after the First World War and gave the Hall and its 6 ½ acres of grounds, to the Preston Royal Infirmary so that it could be used as a continuation hospital. Alteration work began, and by June 1922, the Lostock Hall Continuation Hospital formally opened its doors for women and children, continuing to do so until 1982, when the Lancashire Area Health Authority ceased to exist, and forced the hospital to closed down.

During the final months of the hospital's existence, a group of Trustees had established St. Catherine's Hospice (Lancashire) Limited, in the Lancashire area, and were looking for a building to serve as a hospice base for people in the Preston, Chorley, and South Ribble Boroughs. The lands and building of the Lostock Hall Continuation Hospital were purchased, as this was positioned geographically central to all three Boroughs. The building was renovated, and the first service at the Hospice started in 1984. The first Day Care service took place on 29 April 1985.

=== Ward Street bombings ===
Lostock Hall fell victim to bomb attacks during the Second World War, most seriously when the Leyland Motors factory in Leyland came under attack by a single bomber on 27 October 1940. Although fire from army gunners drove the bomber from his target, three bombs were dropped in the vicinity. Many terraced homes were destroyed and 27 people died. After the war a dance-hall was built on the site, subsequently used industrially by the Bacup Shoe Factory. After the shoe factory's closure in 1982, Calvary Christian Fellowship bought and developed the building and established a centre of worship and community activity.

=== Todd Hall ===
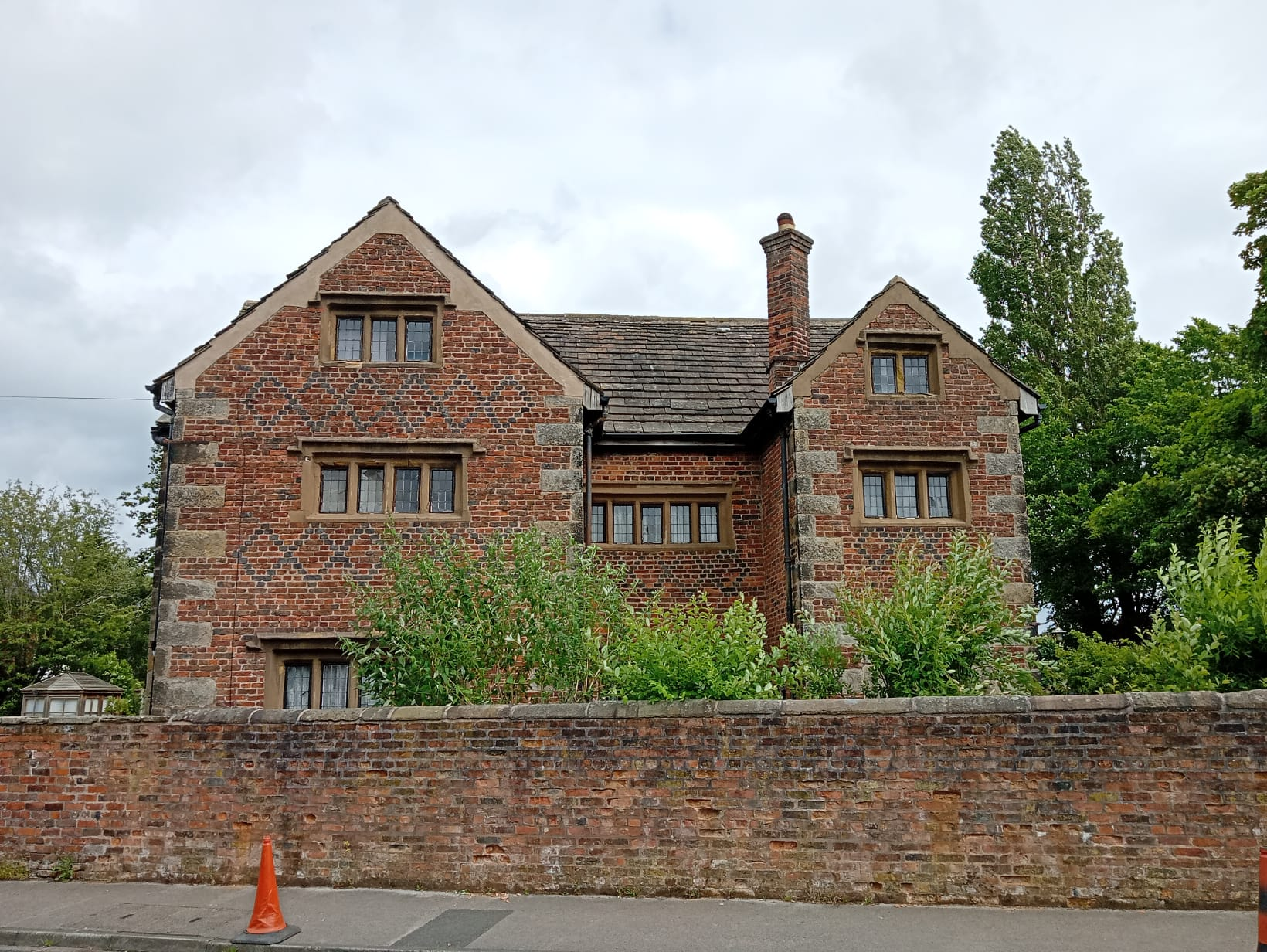
Todd Hall in 2026

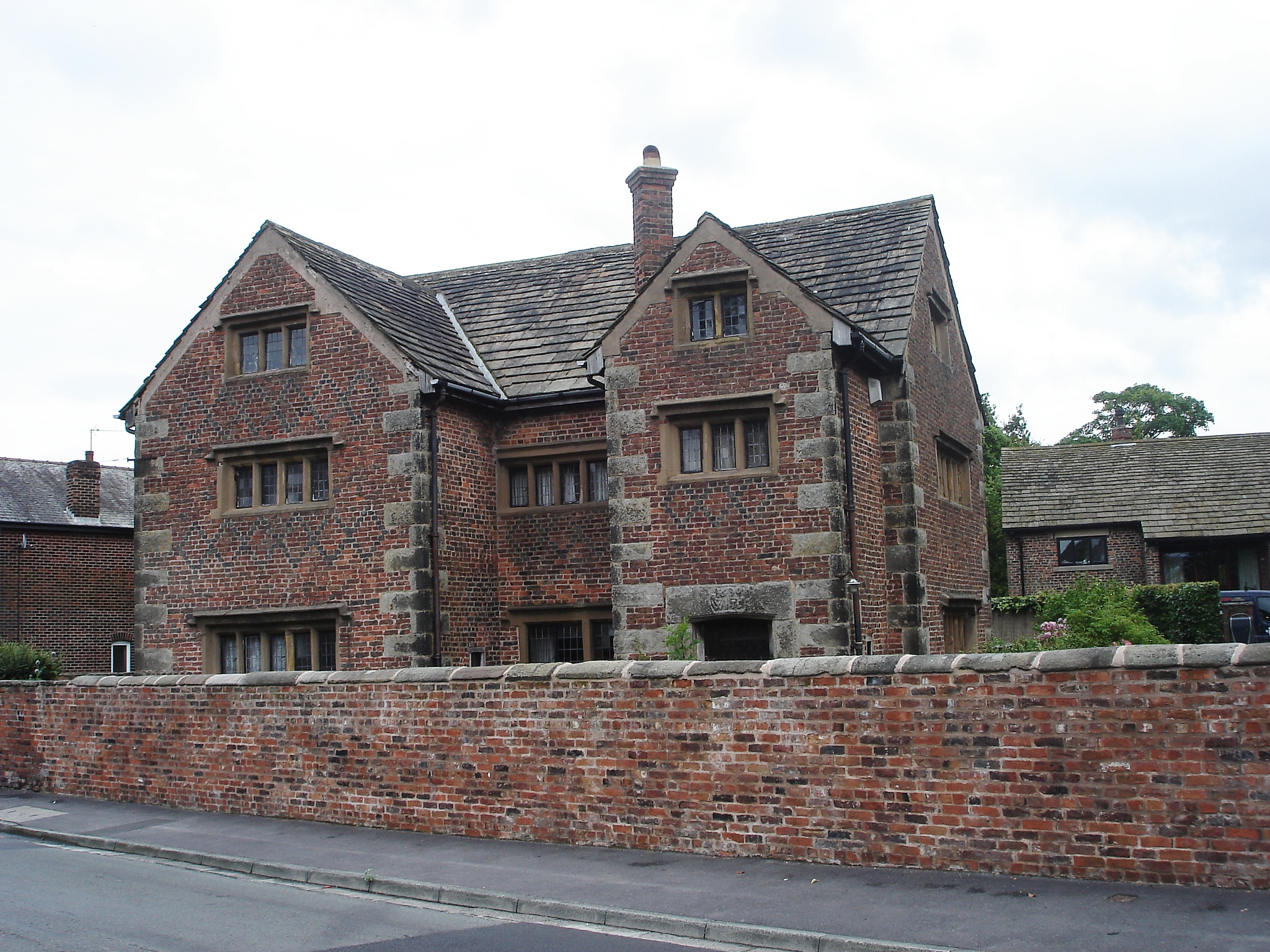
Todd Hall in 2015

Todd Hall in Todd Lane North dates from 1630 and is a Grade II* listed building.

== Governance ==
Lostock Hall is an unparished ward and forms part of the South Ribble borough. Following the South Ribble local council elections in May 2015 Councillors Joseph Clifford Hughes, Jacqui Mort and Renee Noreen Blow, all of the Conservative Party, were elected to represent the Lostock Hall ward.

Lostock Hall forms part of the Lostock Hall & Bamber Bridge electoral division on Lancashire County Council and is represented by David William Bollenberg, of the Labour Party.

Since the general election in 2010 the area has formed part of an extended Ribble Valley constituency. The member of parliament for this constituency is Nigel Evans of the Conservative Party.

Boundary changes proposed by the Boundary Commission for England as part of Sixth Periodic Review of Westminster constituencies would see Lostock Hall move into a revised South Ribble seat at the next general election. The recommendations were submitted to the Government on 5 September 2018 and it’s now up to Parliament to decide whether the boundary changes will be implemented.

== Geography ==
Lostock Hall's main road to the north, Leyland Road leads to the town of Penwortham in the north-west, and on to the City of Preston in the north, this boundary being on the junction between B5254 (Leyland Road) and Flag Lane. To the north-east is the residential district of Walton Park which leads to the village of Walton-le-Dale, with this boundary being the old railway bridge on Wateringpool Lane (just after the gas works). The main road to the east, Brownedge Road, links it to Bamber Bridge, the boundary between the two is the 'Old Railway Bridge' situated on the B5257 (Brownedge Lane). The roundabout junction of B5254 (Watkin Lane) and A582 (Lostock Lane - eastbound), in the south-east, is the boundary which separates Lostock Hall and Cuerden.

== Demography ==
According to the Office for National Statistics, at the time of the United Kingdom Census 2001, Lostock Hall had a population of 3,948, with 1,959 being males, and 1,989 being females. The 2001 population density for inhabitants per square mile (2,065 /km²) was unknown. Lostock Hall's 1,675 households owner occupied statistics, 30.57% owned the house outright, 55.4% owned their houses with a mortgage or loan, 0.9% shared ownership, 0.78% rented from council (local authority), 7.16% rented from housing associations/registered social landlords, 3.7% rented from private landlord or letting agencies, and 1.49% rented from another source.

=== Population change ===
Population growth in Lostock Hall since 1891
Year	1891	1901	1911	1921	1931	1939	1951	1961	1971	1981	1991	2001	2011
Population	3,772	3,827	3,859	3,874	3,877	3,877	3,896	3,903	3,928	3,936	3,935	3,948	3,762
% per year	-	1.43%	0.84%	0.39%	0.09%	0.00%	0.48%	0.18%	0.64%	0.20%	-0.01%	0.32%	-0.47%
Source: Lancashire County Council, South Ribble Records http://www.ukcensusdata.com/lostock-hall-e05005347#sthash.VVLr6e2Y.dpbs

The next census is scheduled to take place during 2021.

== Economy ==
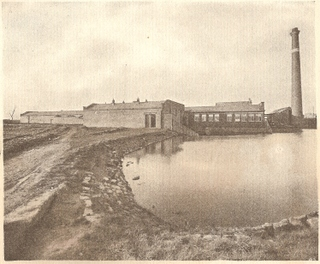
Tardy Gate Mill c. 1920

=== Industrial mills ===
Lostock Hall Spinning company now closed was replaced by a housing estate. Tardy Gate Mill on Coote Lane was built in 1908 by the Tardy Gate Manufacturing Company it was bought out and greatly expanded by Thomas Moss & Sons in 1920 and produced calico and linen until its demise in the late 1970s. The mill also owned the local cricket pitch and sponsored the cricket team. There was also a Ladies' hockey team for many years that was originally made up mainly of workers from the weaving sheds and offices. The mill and a moderately large railway repair depot are now gone, with most inhabitants commuting to work, mainly in Preston. Tardy Gate Mill was then bought by Mr & Mrs Todd, and now houses Todds Motorhomes & camping accessory shop, a snooker hall, a printing business, a car repair garage, and many other small businesses.

== Education ==
=== Schools ===
There are four schools in Lostock Hall. Lostock Hall Academy, located on Todd Lane North, is the local secondary school. Lostock Hall Community Primary School is situated on Linden Drive, and covers Key Stage 1 and Key Stage 2 curriculum. Our Lady And St Gerard's Roman Catholic Primary School is situated on Lourdes Avenue, and covers curriculum for Early Years Foundation Stage, Key Stage 1 and Key Stage 2. Moor Hey School is a special school.

=== Library ===
During the late 1950s and early 1960s, plans were made to create a purpose built library facility in Lostock Hall. Construction took place between 1961 and 1962, and Lostock Hall Library was officially opened by Sir Harry Pilkington on 28 January 1963. The original library consisted of two buildings, which were divided by a central garden area. The central garden area later became roofed in the 1980s to provide a much larger reference library area, with the original reference area being converted into a private office area for the staff to use. A few years passed, and the building came across a few subsidence problems, which were rectified by 1999 when work began on new foundations to cure this problem.

== Transport ==
=== Trains ===
Lostock Hall maintains a railway station. The East Lancashire Line on which the station stands is frequently used by railway companies as a bypass for the main West Coast Main Line when that is being closed for engineering works, as it links with the Settle-Carlisle Line. For this reason, excursions frequently travel through the station, attracting railway enthusiasts to the many ideal viewing places. Lostock Hall Locomotive Shed was one of the final steam sheds housing and servicing steam locomotives up to the end of the steam era in Britain in August 1968.

=== Buses ===
Stagecoach Cumbria and North Lancashire operate two regular bus services through Lostock Hall, providing commuter links to nearby towns and villages, including Preston city centre. Other services are provided by Transdev.
