= Ipswich Academy =

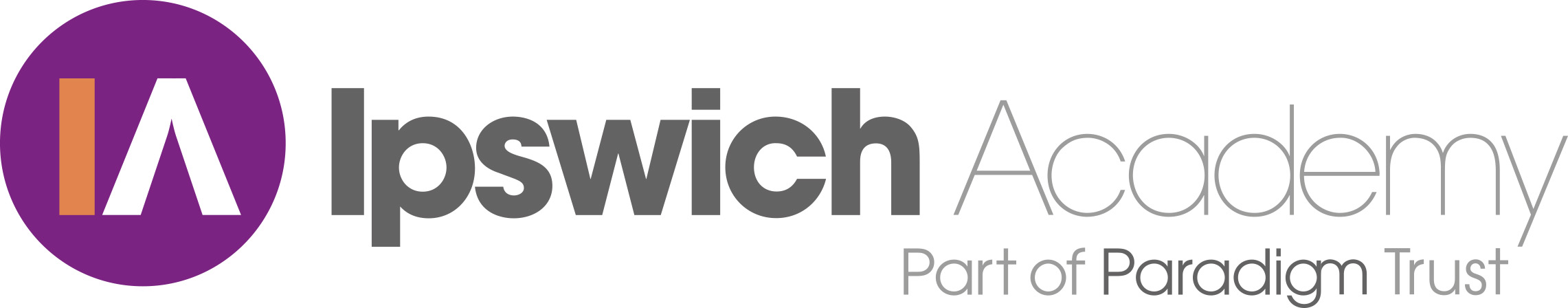

Location
- Braziers Wood Road; Ipswich, Suffolk, IP3 0SP; England
- Coordinates: 52°02′14″N 1°11′35″E

Information
- Type: Academy
- Motto: "Teach the right things, efficiently." - Paradigm Trust
- Department for Education URN: 136453 Tables
- Ofsted: Reports
- Chair of Governors: David Willis
- Principals: Adam Wilding
- Staff: 70
- Gender: Mixed
- Age: 11 to 16
- Enrolment: approx. 1200
- Colours: Black and Purple
- Former name: Holywells High School
- Website: http://ipswichacademy.paradigmtrust.org/

Ipswich Academy (formerly Holywells High School) is a mixed secondary school in Ipswich, Suffolk for students aged 11 to 16. Since September 2010, it has been an Academy.

It has the capacity for over 1,300 students but had around 900 as of 2021. It has a large sports complex and a large multipurpose sports pitch.It has a large indoor sports facility. It also has a main area with a library with a Sixth Form block, and it is building new ball game courts on one of the surrounding fields.

== History ==
In September 2010, Holywells High School become an academy, originally ran by the Learning Schools Trust, and was renamed Ipswich Academy. In September 2015, Paradigm Trust - a multi-academy trust formed in September 2013 - took over operation of the academy.

Ipswich academy was rebuilt and reopened on the Gainsbrough estate on the 29th September 2013 by the education secretary at the time Michael Gove As an open plan school, but this was changed shortly after due to noise issues. Paridigm Trust took over the school in 2015 after a series of damning ofsted reports, and leading to the later collapse of the learning schools trust.

In 2019, Ipswich academy received a ‘Good’ rated report from ofsted after years of improvement, and soon after a new principal, Abbie Thorrington, a professional Triathlon competitor, took over.
