= Geoff Jenkins (climatologist) =

British climatologist

Geoffrey (Geoff) Jenkins is a climatologist and former head of climate change prediction at the Hadley Centre for Climate Prediction and Research, part of the Met Office.

== Career ==
Jenkins is a physics graduate from Southampton university; PhD in atmospheric physics. Thirty years at the Met Office.

In response to why he believes that human activity has caused the recent rise in temperatures he responded:

Feeding in the different agents that cause climate change into our models – like greenhouse gases, output from the Sun, volcanoes - we’ve looked at the patterns of change they cause across the surface of the Earth and through the atmosphere. We compare them to what’s actually been observed and find the best match between computer simulations and the observations. This has indicated to us that over the past 30 or 40 years that most of the warming has been due to human activities.

== See also ==
- Global warming
- Attribution of recent climate change
