= River Lostock =

River in Lancashire, England

Coordinates: 53.6628°N 2.7938°W

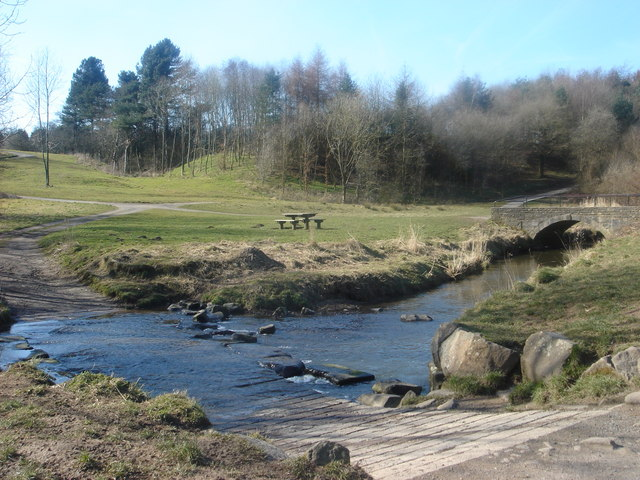
Ford and bridge over the River Lostock at Cuerden Valley Park

The River Lostock is a river in Lancashire, England.

The source of the Lostock is at the confluence of Slack Brook and Whave's Brook at the entrance to Miller Wood near Withnell Fold.

Slack Brook drains an area around Brindle, having its source close to Thorpe Green just outside the village, whereas Whave's Brook rises near Brimmicroft and runs southwards, almost parallel to the Leeds and Liverpool Canal by Ollerton Fold. Whave's Brook is fed by Laund Brook, running northwards from close to Withnell.

The Lostock continues along the Leeds and Liverpool Canal to Lower Copthurst, where it turns westwards, watering Whittle-le-Woods before turning north by Clayton-le-Woods, then running through the Cuerden Valley Park.

Having been joined by Clayton Brook, draining the village of the same name to the east, the river moves westwards, skirting Lostock Hall, then flows south west, past Farington and through the western suburbs of the town of Leyland, collecting Mill Brook (from Worden Park) and Hollin's Brook (draining Runshaw Moor), before moving west once again towards Croston, where it collects Wymott Brook (emanating from close to Midge Hall) before joining the River Yarrow shortly afterwards.

== Etymology ==
Lostock could primarily be a settlement name (see Lostock Hall) and may, like other similar names in Lancashire, be derived from Old English hlōse-, meaning "a pig-sty", and -stoc, "a place, secondary settlement". The name could also be a Brittonic hydronym, derived from lost, chiefly (perhaps metaphorically) meaning "a tail" (Welsh llost). This is suffixed with the nominal suffix -ǭg. A derivative of the aforementioned lost, *lostǭg, perhaps meaning "a beaver" (though note Cornish lostek, "fox") could also underlie the name.

== Water quality ==
The Environment Agency measure the water quality of the river systems in England. Each is given an overall ecological status, which may be one of five levels: high, good, moderate, poor and bad. There are several components that are used to determine this, including biological status, which looks at the quantity and varieties of invertebrates, angiosperms and fish. Chemical status, which compares the concentrations of various chemicals against known safe concentrations, is rated good or fail.

The water quality of the River Lostock system was as follows in 2016. Reasons for the quality being less than good include sewage discharge, physical modification of the channel and poor nutrient management of agricultural land.

Section	Ecological Status	Chemical Status	Overall Status	Length	Catchment	Channel
Lostock US Farington Weir	Moderate	Good	Moderate	12.7 miles (20.4 km)	12.30 square miles (31.9 km^{2})	heavily modified
Lostock DS Farington Weir	Moderate	Good	Moderate	13.9 miles (22.4 km)	15.52 square miles (40.2 km^{2})	heavily modified
