= Lewis Wyatt =

British architect (1777–1853)

Lewis William Wyatt (1777–1853) was a British architect, a nephew of both Samuel and James Wyatt of the Wyatt family of architects, who articled with each of his uncles and began practice on his own about 1805.

Lewis Wyatt is known primarily for the English country houses he designed, which include Grade II* Cuerden Hall near Preston in 1816–1819, and for restoring and altering Lyme Park and Heaton Park. Between 1795 and 1800 he partially rebuilt Wythenshawe Hall.
