= Wiltshire College & University Centre =

Further education college in Wiltshire, United Kingdom

Wiltshire College and University Centre
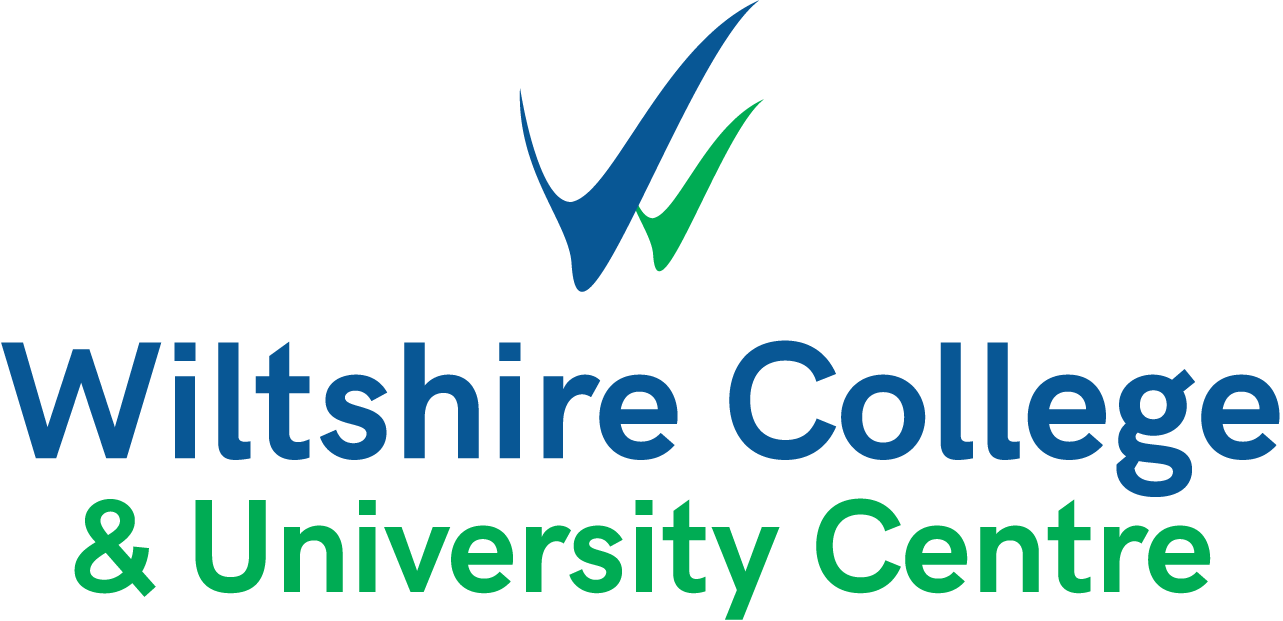

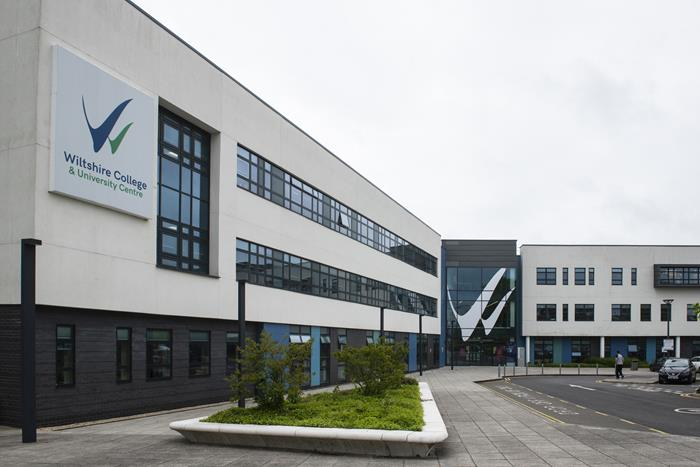
- Chippenham campus

Location
- Castle Combe, Chippenham, Lacock, Salisbury, Trowbridge, Wiltshire; United Kingdom; 51.4632°N 2.1108°W

Information
- Type: Further education
- Established: 2002
- Department for Education URN: 132779 Tables
- Ofsted: Reports
- Principal: Iain Hatt
- Staff: 750
- Age: 16+
- Enrolment: 9,000+ (full-time, part-time & University level)
- Website: www.wiltshire.ac.uk

Wiltshire College & University Centre is a tertiary college of education founded in 2002 by the merger of Chippenham Technical College, Lackham College and Trowbridge College. Consolidation was completed with the merger of Salisbury College, which commenced in January 2008. In 2020-21 the institution offered over 1,000 courses and had approximately 3,300 full-time and 6,000 part-time students, with over 800 enrolled on degree-level courses.

In 2018, the College was granted university status and was renamed Wiltshire College & University Centre in recognition of its offering of Higher Education and Degree Level courses.

The college was assessed as 'good' by OfSTED in July 2018, and this was confirmed by a short inspection in May 2018.

== Locations ==
- Wiltshire College’s Chippenham campus was founded as North Wilts College of Further Education and later changed its name to Chippenham Technical College, and again to Chippenham College in 1993. It offers a range of vocational courses and qualifications, specialising in engineering, commerce and construction trades. Its buildings are in Cocklebury Road, close to the town centre and railway station, and were rebuilt on the existing site in 2015 at a cost of £21 million. There are workshops for motor vehicle and motorsport engineering, general and electronic engineering labs and facilities for construction trades, as well as hair and beauty salons, art studios, Mac suites and a media production studio.
- Wiltshire College’s Lackham campus, at Lackham House, between Chippenham and Lacock, opened in 1946 as a purely agricultural college. It has a 1000-acre estate including a working farm to allow students hands-on experience of the rural economy, and also hosts a Museum of Agriculture and Rural Life. For the 2021–22 academic year, £9 million was spent on improvements to the site including a new AgriTech Centre. Other resources include an Animal Resource Centre with exotic and domestic animals, a robotic milking parlour, engineering workshops, science labs and on-site accommodation. The college offers extramural courses to non-students and has a programme of public events throughout the year, such as the annual Lambing Weekend where visitors can see lambs being born.
- Wiltshire College’s Trowbridge campus, in College Road, offers a range of vocational courses for school-leavers. It houses the Arc Theatre, a venue for live performances, as well as hair and beauty salons, science labs, motor vehicle workshops, art studios, Mac suites, a production studio and The White Horse Restaurant, a student-run restaurant. A Construction Skills Centre opened in 2015.

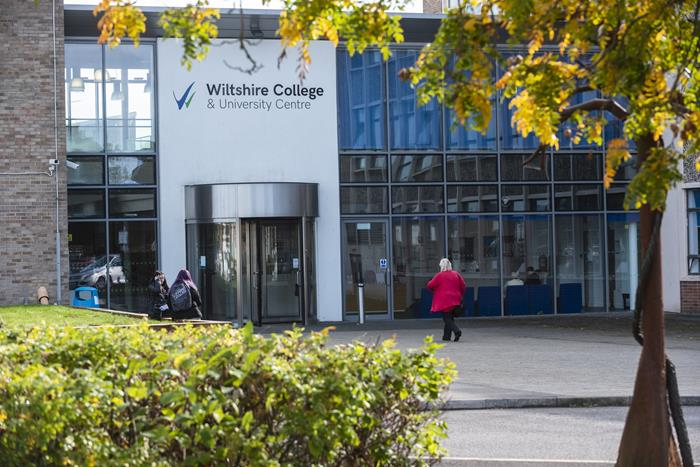
Main Building, Wiltshire College Trowbridge

- Wiltshire College’s Salisbury campus was formed in 1992 by the merger of the College of Art & Design and the Technology College. Near the city centre in Southampton Road, it offers degree courses in association with Bournemouth University and vocational courses for school leavers. After a £14 million redevelopment completed in June 2021, the college has science and engineering labs, construction workshops, a TV studio, canteen facilities and conferencing space. Other facilities include hair and beauty salons, art studios, Mac suites, construction and motor vehicle workshops, on-site accommodation and The Wessex Restaurant, a student-run restaurant.
- The Methuen Centre at Corsham, a converted 19th-century school, is used to deliver part-time and evening arts and crafts courses.
- Castle Combe, at the Castle Combe Circuit near Chippenham, is the home of Wiltshire College's £1.25 million 6,500 square foot motorsport centre. The centre was the first circuit-based motorsport engineering centre in the UK, and has two classrooms, six car workshops, an engine workshop and a machining workshop. It provides motorsport engineering courses ranging from the BTEC Level 2 Diploma to a Level 6 BEng Honours Degree.
- Since January 2023, adult education classes are offered at Westbury with support from Wiltshire Council and the Westbury Community Project charity.

Until late 2018, the college also had a site in Devizes.

== Courses ==
Wiltshire College logo from 2002 to 2018

=== School leavers ===
A wide range of courses are offered to students, full-time or as apprenticeships. From September 2022, the new T Level qualification will be introduced. Vocational qualifications include BTEC Diplomas, NVQ Level 1, and GCSE.

Subject areas offered for further education include: Agriculture, Animal, Art and Design, Automotive Maintenance, Business, Finance and Management, Catering and Hospitality, Civil Engineering, Computing and IT, Construction and Trades, Criminology, Early Years, Engineering and Manufacturing, English and Maths, Equine, Fashion and Textiles, Film and Media Production, Games Development, Hair and Beauty, Health and Social Care, Horticulture, Land-based Engineering, Motorsport Engineering, Music, Performing and Production Arts, Photography and Graphics, Public Services, Sciences, Sport, Travel and Tourism.

=== University level ===
The college also have a higher education offer, where courses lead to qualifications including Foundation degrees, HNC, HND, and BA/BSc degrees.

- Chippenham: Business, Computing & Systems Development, Applied Computing, Criminal Justice, Electrical & Electronic Engineering, Mechanical Engineering, Civil Engineering, Creative Media Production.
- Castle Combe: Motorsport Engineering.
- Salisbury: Art & Design, Film Production & Cinematography, Music, Photography, Creative Media Production, Games Development, Criminal Justice, Education Studies for Teaching Assistants, Professional Certificate in Education.
- Trowbridge: Art & Design, Early Years & Childhood Studies, Health & Social Care, Social Work.
- Lackham: land-based courses including Animal Science & Management, Agricultural Engineering, Agricultural Management, Equine Management, Sports Coaching.

=== Part-time and evening ===
A range of courses are available for adults, including creative, finance and employability, languages, and digital skills courses.

=== Distance learning ===
These level two or three courses allow learners to study at home, completing qualifications remotely using an e-assessor programme. Many of these courses are offered free of charge to the student. Subjects include professional development, health and social care, health and wellbeing and childcare.

=== Commercial ===
Courses in Health & Safety licensing, business and management, construction and more are available for employees and for employers to train and upskill their staff.

== Alumni ==
- Jamie Cullum – singer/songwriter
- Lizzie Greenwood-Hughes – television presenter
- Lewis Haldane – professional football player
- Aaron Moores – Paralympic swimmer
