= Goldney =

Goldneyis a surname, and may refer to:

== People ==
- Francis Bennett-Goldney
- Sir Gabriel Goldney, 1st Baronet
- Sir Gabriel Goldney, 2nd Baronet
- Sir Frederick Goldney, 3rd Baronet
- Sir Henry Goldney, 4th Baronet
- George Goldney (1816–1871), English clergyman and cricketer
- George Hone-Goldney (1851–1921), English lawyer and cricketer, and son of the above
- John Goldney

== Others ==
- Goldney baronets
- Goldney family
- Goldney Hall
- Goldney House
- Goldney River
- Goldney ball
- Goldney gardens
