= Goldney family =

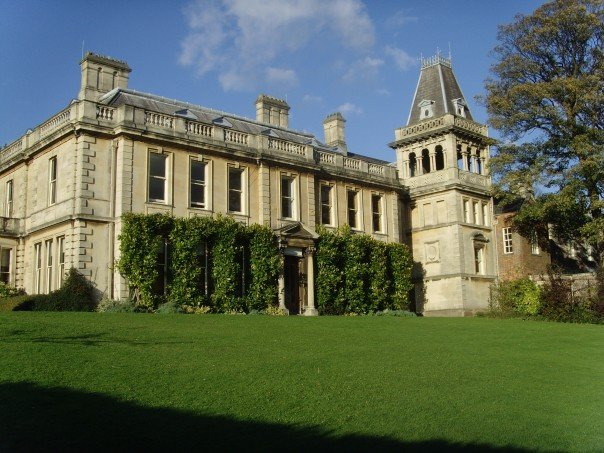
Goldney Hall, Bristol

The Goldney family were a wealthy English merchant trading family, most associated with Wiltshire and latterly Bristol. Later branches of the family became the Goldney baronets.

== Wiltshire ==
The Goldney family made their monies as weavers and clothiers in Chippenham in the sixteenth century.

Henry Goldney was a member of parliament for Chippenham, and in 1553 was appointed the first "Bayliff" of Chippenham. A 17th-century ancestor, also named Gabriel and a noted Freemason, left bequests in his will to provide "greatcoats for six poor inhabitants".

Many of the Wiltshire-resident branch of the family are buried at St Bartholomew's Church, Corsham.

== Bristol ==
=== Thomas Goldney I ===
In 1637, his father sent Thomas Goldney I to serve as an apprentice for seven years in Bristol, to enable him to become a freeman. After almost nine years, on 22 June 1646, he paid his fee and became a freeman of the city of Bristol. In the same year, Thomas married Mary Clements, set himself up as a grocer, and moved to a property on the High Street near Bristol Bridge. Both Thomas and his wife joined the Society of Friends, also known as the Quakers, after which they suffered both fines and imprisonment for their beliefs. In 1674 Thomas bought a country estate at Elberton, Gloucestershire for £700. He did not take up residence, but gained income from the associated rents for tenants and farmers. However, from 1681 financial difficulties forced him to lease out the estate on a long-term arrangement to his son-in-law, James Wallis. In 1688, Thomas built four houses on land formerly known as Castle Precincts. Taking one for himself, he rented the other three out, and rented his former house on the High Street to his son Thomas Goldney II and his family. Thomas Goldney I died in 1694, and his wife died in 1709.

=== Thomas Goldney II ===
Born in Bristol in 1664, in 1687 he married Hannah Speed, the daughter of merchant Thomas Speed. As his father was a freeman, Thomas II achieved the same level the following year through being the son of a free burgess. From 1688 he took over the family grocery business, but also invested in other ventures, including: merchant ships; farmland at Elberton; as well as acting as an agent for the Collector of Customs for the Port of Bristol. Having invested in land at Clifton, from 1694 Thomas leased an adjoining country estate complete with a manor house, which after purchase in 1705 for £100 he named Goldney House.

Thomas became the principal shareholder for Captain Woodes Rogers' voyage on the Duke and her sister ship Dutchess. Rogers' crew rescued the real-life Robinson Crusoe, Alexander Selkirk, from Juan Fernandez island. However, shortly after the ships sailed, Thomas ran into a series of legal difficulties, and was jailed over a debt from 1708 to 1710. In 1711, Woodes Rogers returned to Bristol, and for an initial investment of £3,726 Thomas received payments £6,800, a huge amount by today's standards. This enabled him in 1713 to make a large investment in Abraham Darby I ironworks at Coalbrookdale, Shropshire. With costs escalating, in April 1713 Darby mortgaged half of the Coalbrookdale works to Thomas for £1,700. After Abraham Darby I died intestate in 1717, Thomas protected his assets by acquiring 8 of the 16 shares in the Coalbrookdale works via his widow Mary Darby. In 1718 Thomas assigned two further shares to his son, Thomas Goldney III, which gave them the controlling interest in the works. Renamed the Dale Company, control allowed the Goldney's to invest and further develop the ironworks.

Thomas Goldney II and his son, another Thomas, were linked to the triangular slave trade, through the goods manufactured and sold by the ironworks. The works produced manillas and the brass objects which were traded for slaves in Africa to transport to the Americas.

From 1723, Thomas began to retire, initially developing Goldney House and surrounding lands, and then from 1725 taking a two-month tour of Europe, from which he returned afresh to make more adjustments to his property. He died in 1731.

=== Thomas Goldney III ===
Born in Goldney Hall in 1696, after a top-level education he became apprenticed to his parents from 1711. His father trained him in accounts, enabling him to become an assistant bookkeeper at Coalbrookdale after the death of Abraham Darby I. Thomas III resultantly became involved as an investor in a number of businesses, including: the Willey furnace, across the River Severn from Coalbrookdale; the Bersham furnace near Wrexham; and the Warmley Works of William Champion, which produced copper, brass, spelter and utensils. From 1750, Thomas invested in a mine at Gronant, Flintshire, intended for the mining of lead, copper ore and calamine. A successful venture, it led to Thomas investing in other mines at Kellyn, Whitford, Devon, Cornwall and Ireland.

From 1751, Thomas bought shares in three ships, which bought iron goods down from Coalbrookdale to Bristol, and onwards for sale to merchants. This led in 1752 to his becoming one of six partners who founded the Goldney, Smith and Co. merchant bank, one of the first six banks established in the UK. After the death of the original partners, after a series of name changes and takeovers it became part of the National Westminster Bank, today a division of the Royal Bank of Scotland.

From 1754, Thomas III financed Abraham Darby II's construction of a new furnace at Horsehay. After the opening of a second furnace on the same site, and a third at Ketley, Thomas III and Darby II agreed to integrate their works through development of a wagonway. By 1757, 5 miles (8.0 km) of wooden track had been laid, transporting both raw materials and finished product.

=== Legacy ===
Thomas Goldney III died without heir in 1768. He left his shares to his surviving family, who retained their interests until 1773, when they sold them to Abraham Darby III for £10,000. The shares in Ketley and Horsehay were bought in 1775 by the manager of Coalbrookdale, Richard Reynolds.

== Goldney baronets ==
Goldney arms: Party per pale gules and azure, on a bend engrailed plain cotised argent, between two eagles displayed of the last, three garbs sable, banded or

The Goldney baronetcy, of Beechfield in the Parish of Corsham and Bradenstoke Abbey in the Parish of Lyneham, both in the County of Wiltshire, was a title in the Baronetage of the United Kingdom. It was created on 11 May 1880 for Gabriel Goldney, Conservative Member of Parliament for Chippenham. The title became extinct on the death of the fourth Baronet in 1974. Sir John Goldney, Chief Justice of Trinidad and Tobago, was the third son of the first Baronet.

=== Goldney baronets, of Beechfield and Bradenstoke Abbey (1880) ===
- Sir Gabriel Goldney, 1st Baronet (1813–1900)
- Sir Gabriel Prior Goldney, 2nd Baronet (1843–1925)
- Sir Frederick Hastings Goldney, 3rd Baronet (1845–1940)
- Sir Henry Hastings Goldney, 4th Baronet (1886–1974)

== Goldney Hall ==
Thomas Goldney III enlarged and improved the grounds of Goldney Hall. In 1724 the earlier house was partially demolished to be replaced by a grander building, possibly built by George Tully. The grotto, built at enormous expense by Goldney to entertain his wealthy friends, is today a Grade I listed building, one of originally six follies within the garden grounds, which today include a gothic tower which houses a steam pump produced at Coalbrookdale that was used to irrigate his estate. There is also a bastion, a rotunda and an ornamental canal.

The house was recased, altered and extended in 1864–65 by Alfred Waterhouse, who also designed the Natural History Museum. The house was later owned by other wealthy Bristol families, the Wills and the Frys; among them Lewis Fry (1832–1921) who was a member of the prominent Bristol Fry Family and became a Liberal MP and the first chairman of the University of Bristol University Council.
