= Gabriel Goldney =

Gabriel Goldney may refer to:

- Sir Gabriel Goldney, 1st Baronet (1813–1900), member of the House of Commons from 1865 to 1885
- Sir Gabriel Goldney, 2nd Baronet (1843–1925), barrister, son of the above

== See also ==
- Goldney (surname)
