= Goldney baronets =

Extinct baronetcy in the Baronetage of the United Kingdom

- Escutcheon of the Goldney baronets of Beechfield and Bradenstoke Abbey
- Creation date: 1880
- Status: extinct
- Extinction date: 1974
- Motto: Honor virtutis præmium ("Honour is the reward of virtue")
- Arms: Party per pale gules and azure, on a bend engrailed plain cotised argent, between two eagles displayed of the last, three garbs sable, banded or
- Crest: In front of a garb sable, banded as in the arms, three quatrefoils, or

The Goldney baronetcy, of Beechfield in the Parish of Corsham and Bradenstoke Abbey in the Parish of Lyneham, both in the County of Wiltshire, was a title in the Baronetage of the United Kingdom. It was created on 11 May 1880 for Gabriel Goldney, Conservative Member of Parliament for Chippenham.

The title became extinct on the death of the 4th Baronet in 1974.

== Goldney baronets, of Beechfield and Bradenstoke Abbey (1880) ==
- Sir Gabriel Goldney, 1st Baronet (1813–1900)
- Sir Gabriel Prior Goldney, 2nd Baronet (1843–1925)
- Sir Frederick Hastings Goldney, 3rd Baronet (1845–1940)
- Sir Henry Hastings Goldney, 4th Baronet (1886–1974)

== Extended family ==
Sir John Goldney, Chief Justice of Trinidad and Tobago, was the third son of the 1st Baronet.

Baronetage of the United Kingdom
Preceded by Bourne baronets	Goldney baronets of Beechfield and Bradenstoke Abbey; 11 May 1880	Succeeded by Watkin baronets
