= Bradenstoke =

Village in Wiltshire, England

Coordinates: 51.514°N 01.999°W

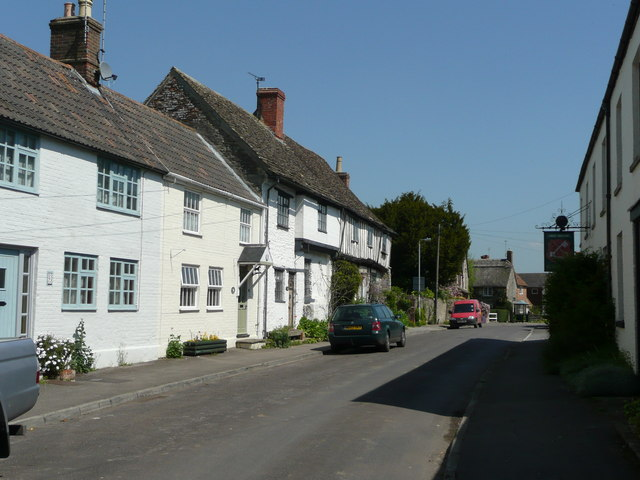
- Bradenstoke village street

- Location within Wiltshire
- OS grid reference: SU002795
- Civil parish: Lyneham and Bradenstoke
- Unitary authority: Wiltshire
- Ceremonial county: Wiltshire
- Region: South West
- Country: England
- Sovereign state: United Kingdom
- Post town: Chippenham
- Postcode district: SN15
- Dialling code: 01249
- Police: Wiltshire
- Fire: Dorset and Wiltshire
- Ambulance: South Western
- UK Parliament: Chippenham
- Website: Parish Council

Bradenstoke is a village in Wiltshire, England, lying to the north of the former RAF Lyneham airbase and 1.5 miles (2.4 km) northwest of Lyneham. Originally lying within Braydon Forest, the "stoke" means "settlement".

Largely consisting of a long and narrow main street, the village has a church, one chapel (it used to have two chapels but the Methodist Chapel has been converted into a dwelling), a village hall and a pub. The Post Office closed in 2008.

== History ==
Bradenstoke is the oldest community in the present-day parish, with 42 households recorded at Stoche in Domesday Book. In 1866, the ecclesiastical parish of Bradenstoke-cum-Clack was created for the newly built church. The name Bradenstoke was revived in the mid-twentieth century and is now used exclusively.

A medieval limestone village cross stands at the side of the road near the church, having been moved from the middle of the road in the 20th century. Now headless, its base serves as a war memorial.

An independent congregation built a chapel in the village in 1777, in brick with stone quoins and window dressings, which was later named Providence Chapel and used by Particular Baptists. In 2018 the chapel continues in use.

The church of St Mary the Virgin was built in 1866 at the expense of Gabriel Goldney to designs of C.F. Hansom, as a chapelry of the parish church at Lyneham. In the same year an ecclesiastical parish called Bradenstoke-cum-Clack was created for the new church, from parts of the parishes of Lyneham and Christian Malford. Since 1954 the parish has been Lyneham with Bradenstoke.

== Local government ==
The civil parish elects a parish council called Lyneham and Bradenstoke Parish Council. The parish is in the area of Wiltshire Council, a unitary authority which is responsible for all significant local government functions.

== Priory ==
The former Bradenstoke Priory was founded in 1142 by Walter D’Evereaux, sheriff of Wiltshire, for the Augustinians. Having fallen into disrepair after the Dissolution of the Monasteries, it was dismantled in 1930 to provide building material for the renovation of St Donat's Castle in Wales, which had been bought by William Randolph Hearst. Most of the priory, including the roof, was unused and its whereabouts is now unknown.

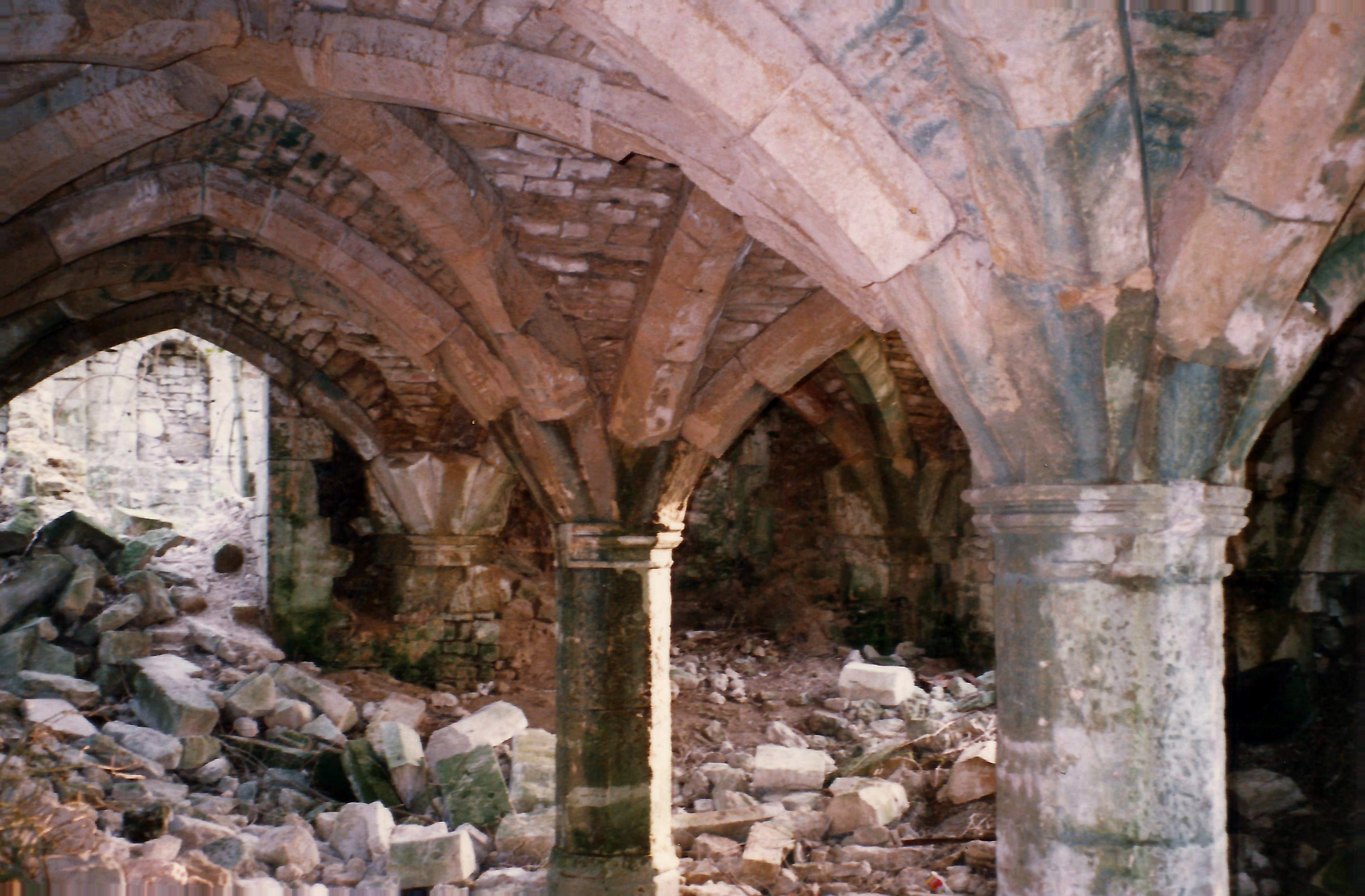
Undercroft of the abbey

A 15th-century timber-framed building in Bradenstoke village is reputedly a guesthouse for the priory; it was converted to a house in the 16th century and divided into three cottages in the 18th, and is now Grade II* listed.

Bradenstoke Abbey Farmhouse carries a date of 1780 and has some reused stonework from the priory.

== Clack Mount ==
Close to the priory are earthworks known as Clack Mount ("clack" meaning "hill"). The site may pre-date the priory, and has ditches and ponds which were probably fishponds for the priory. A mound – 19m in diameter and 1.5m high – has been described as a motte-and-bailey castle although its early history is uncertain.

== Sources ==
- Mee, Arthur (1939). The King's England: Wiltshire. London: Hodder & Stoughton. ISBN 0-340-00107-0.
