= Goldney Hall =

Hall of residence at the University of Bristol, England

- University of Bristol
- Location: Bristol, England, BS8 1BH
- Coordinates: 51.4523°N 2.6154°W
- Motto: Honor Virtutis Præmium
- Motto in English: "Honour is the Reward of Virtue"
- Established: 1724, 1956 as student accommodation
- Residents: 267
- Website: bristol.ac.uk/students/accommodation/goldney-hall/

Goldney Hall is a self-catered hall of residence in the University of Bristol. It is one of three in the Clifton area of Bristol, England.

The hall occupies part of the grounds of Goldney House, built in the 18th century and remodelled in the 1860s. The house and several garden features are listed structures, and the garden is designated Grade II* on the Register of Historic Parks and Gardens.

== History ==
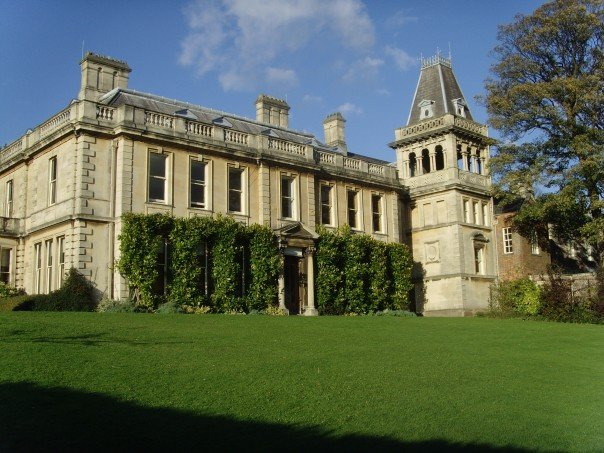
Goldney Hall

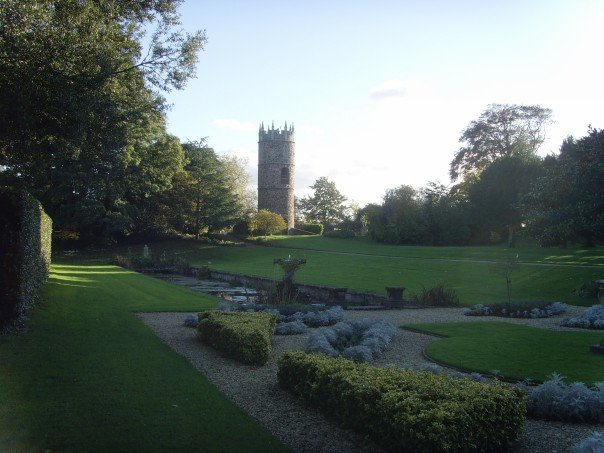
The canal and Gothic tower. A folly, the tower is an extravagant example of an engine house for a water well pump, supplying the canal, fountain and grotto.

The Goldney family's influence in Bristol can be traced to 1637, when Thomas Goldney was sent by his father to Bristol from Chippenham in Wiltshire, to serve as an apprentice for seven years. His son born in 1664, also named Thomas, prospered as a grocer and in 1694 leased a country house in Clifton, now known as Goldney Hall. After the death of his father in 1703, Thomas Goldney II purchased a majority of the current Goldney Estate, complete with manor house, for a fee of £100 in 1705.

In 1724 the earlier house was partially demolished to be replaced by a grander building, possibly built for Goldney by George Tully, a Bristol merchant who was a partner of William Champion in the Coalbrookdale Works. The Goldney family were Quakers but their beliefs did not prevent them developing a significant range of enterprises; ventures included:

- Providing a significant proportion of the capital for Captain Woodes Rogers voyage on The Duke and its sister ship The Dutchess. Rogers' crew rescued the real-life Robinson Crusoe, Alexander Selkirk, from Juan Fernandez island.
- Investment in the Coalbrookdale Iron Works, which led to Thomas Goldney III becoming the majority owner of the works.
- Co-founding Goldney, Smith and Co., one of the first banks in Bristol and now part of the Royal Bank of Scotland.

The Goldney family funded several ships that took part in the Atlantic slave trade. Some students have called for the University of Bristol to consider renaming the building.

The gardens and orchards were designed by Goldney's son Thomas Goldney III. The house was recased, altered and extended in 1864–65 by Alfred Waterhouse, who also designed the Natural History Museum. The house later passed down to other wealthy Bristol families, the Wills and the Frys. Lewis Fry (1832–1921) became the Liberal MP for Bristol and first chairman of the University of Bristol University Council.

== Buildings and grounds ==
=== House ===
The current house was built in 1724, and occupies a hilltop position overlooking the city of Bristol and Brandon Hill. The landscape garden is used for weddings and receptions.

The main house is a Grade II listed building. Other facilities in the main house include a bar, library, common room and dark room. The house also contains an ornate mahogany parlour complete with original wooden panelling dating back to 1725, which is reserved for meetings and special events.

When the hall was gifted to the University of Bristol in 1953, the house was converted (completed in 1956) to accommodate 19 female students and was a catered hall. This was reverted with the development of the new blocks.

=== Student accommodation ===
The student accommodation blocks, built on a paddock within the gardens, were completed in their original form in 1969. This original development consisted of nine stand alone blocks in a quadrangle arrangement. A major, award-winning refurbishment was completed in 1994, after a benefaction from Lord and Lady Sainsbury through the Linbury Trust]. The design was that of Bristol architects Alec French. Improvements to the site included:

- Building additional study bedrooms, kitchens and fire escape stairwells onto the original blocks.
- Construction of Linbury Court, consisting of 24 en-suite rooms and student study facilities.
- Creation of a small on-site car park.

The hall now comprises 11 blocks, 2 of which have en-suite facilities. The hall can accommodate 267 students, in addition to three flats for staff located within the main house.

=== Gardens and grounds ===
The historic English Landscape Garden style grounds, designed by Thomas Goldney III, include an orangery, gothic tower and grotto. The Goldney Hall gardens encompass a 10-acre (4.0 ha) site and are known for their notable five follies:

- Ornamental Canal
- Gothic Tower
- Rotunda
- Mock Bastion
- Shell-lined Grotto

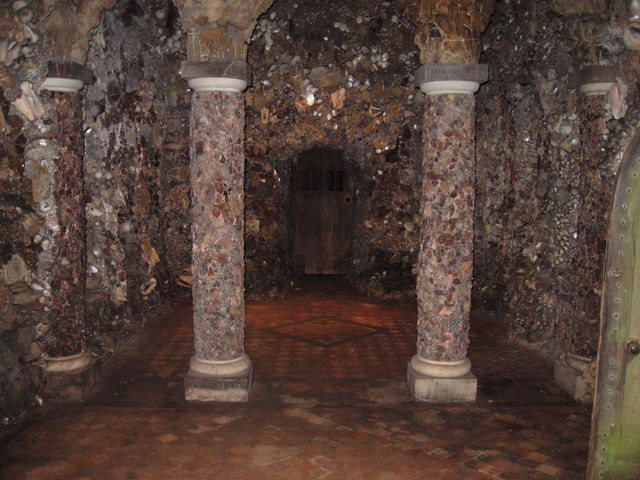
The Goldney Shell Grotto

A sixth folly, the Octagon, consisted of a two-story summer house located where L block stands today. While the exact date of the removal of the Octagon is not known, it is missing from plans which date to 1864. The garden also features a canal.

The hall has an orangery, which is attached to the main house and faces out onto the canal. The original glass roof was replaced with tile at some point in the early 1900s.

The gothic tower, to the south of the main house, was built in 1764 to house a Newcomen atmospheric engine. The opening through which the beam of the engine would have passed can still be seen today on the north face of the tower. The engine, constructed using a boiler supplied by the Coalbrookdale works, is supposed to have been the first used for non-industrial purposes in the world. It was used to draw water from a 120 feet (37 m) well shaft directly in front of the tower. The water was used to supply a fountain in the canal and the cascade in the grotto.

The grounds include a statue of Hercules, which is Grade II* listed and is suspected to be a second-hand purchase by Thomas Goldney III, bought from Edward Southwell Jr. and relocated from Kings Weston House. The mock bastion provides a mystery, appearing for the first time on a map dating to 1748 but with no other surviving documentation of its construction.

The grounds are listed Grade II* on the Register of Historic Parks and Gardens of special historic interest in England, and are regularly used for weddings, especially during the summer months. The gardens are opened annually to the public as well as for smaller groups by request.

=== Grotto ===
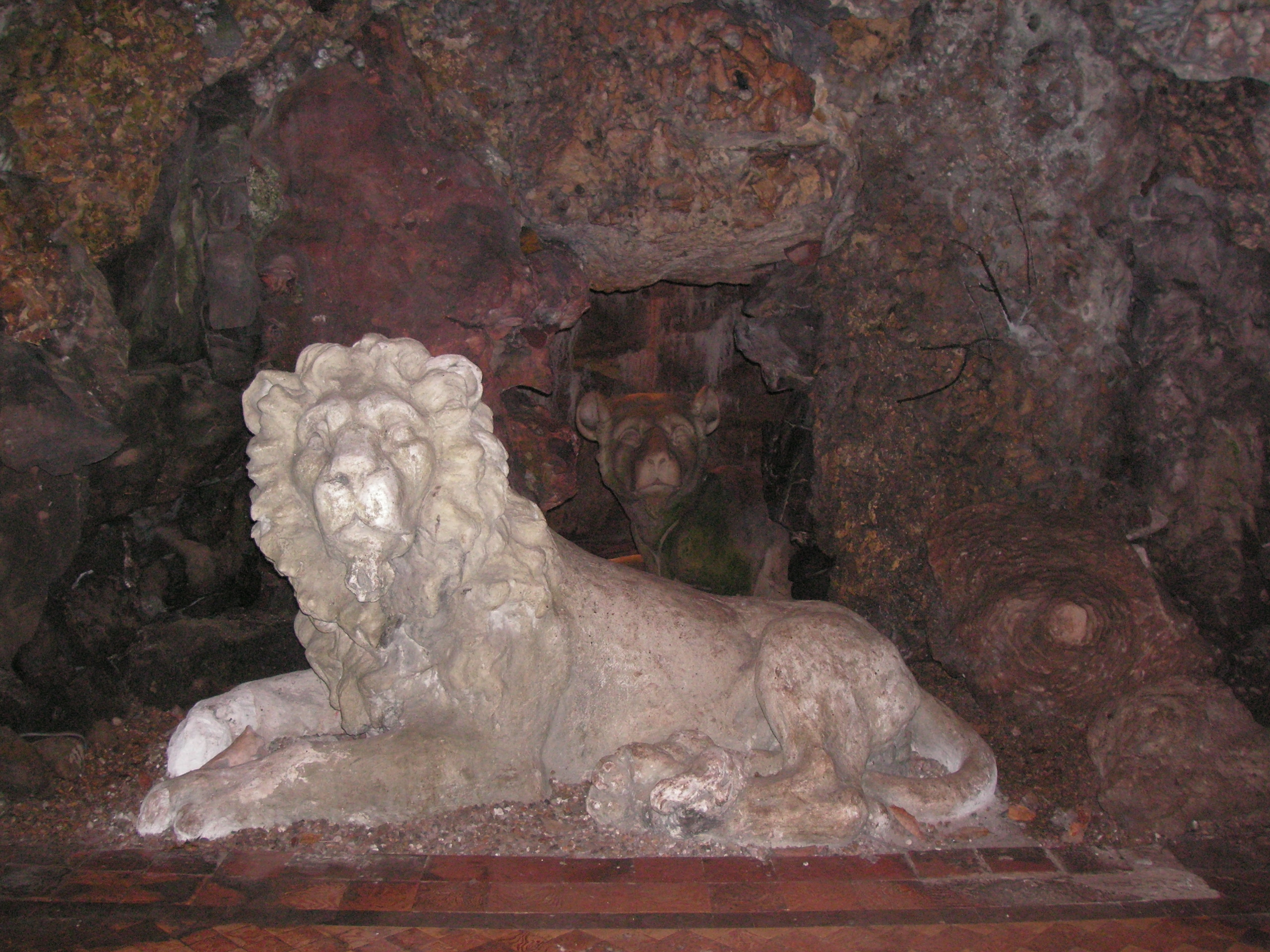
A statue in Goldney Grotto

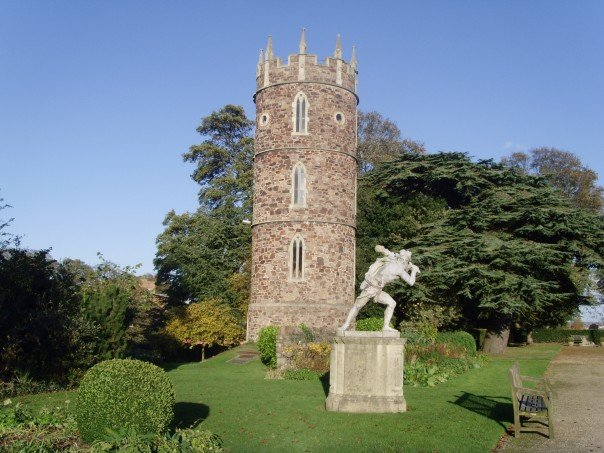
The gothic tower and statue of Hercules

The ornately decorated grotto was created between 1737 and 1764 (dated 1739) and has been designated by English Heritage as a Grade I listed building. It is decorated inside with shells, quartz and rock crystal and inside is a pillared hall with fountains, rock pool, statue of Neptune and a Lion's Den. In 1762-5 Thomas Paty was employed in "grinding, gooping and laying" tiles for the grotto.

The grotto was built as the centrepiece of the gardens by Thomas Goldney III. It is the only Grotto in Britain with both a shell room and running water.

The grotto is approximately 36 ft (11 m) long by 12 ft (3.6 m) wide and consists of three chambers divided by pillars encrusted with quartz crystals. The central chamber houses a life size plaster of paris lion with a lioness sitting in a den behind. Another chamber hosts a seated river god with water running from an urn over giant clams into a pool. It is lined with over 200 species of shell brought back from such locations as the Caribbean, and African waters. The roof of the central hall is composed of closely fitting blocks of Bath stone carved into pseudo-stalactites. On a panel on the door is the portrait of a lady, thought to be Ann Goldney (1707–96), the younger sister of Thomas Goldney III.

The grotto is opened to the public during Garden Tour days organised by the University's Conference Office and to students at various points through the academic year.

== Student life ==
Goldney Hall is one of the smaller halls of residence at the University of Bristol and is located away from the main grouping of halls in Stoke Bishop. As a result, the hall has a strong individual identity and close-knit community.

=== Ball ===
The Goldney Ball is an annual event held in the grounds of Goldney Hall to mark the end of term and the summer exam period for students in the Bristol area and typically attracts over 1000 students. Previous artists to headline and perform at the Ball include Hot Chocolate (1998), Roni Size (1999), Shy FX, DJ Hype, BodyRockers, Ninja Tune, Jools Holland, and the Scratch Perverts, as well as illusionist Derren Brown and entertainer and DJ Paul Chuckle. Profit from the event is donated to local, national and international charities.

=== Motto ===
The hall's motto is Honor Virtutis Præmium ("Honour is the Reward of Virtue").

=== Sports ===
The hall fields a number of sports teams including football, netball and rugby.

Goldney Hall FC compete in the Bristol University Intramural Accenture League 4. They won the title in the 09/10, 12/13 and 15/16 seasons. They are current holders of the Bristol University Intramural Division 3 title, under the name The Wanderers, following their success in the 22/23 season.

== Film location ==
Goldney Hall is a popular location for filming with The Chronicles of Narnia, The House of Eliott, Truly, Madly, Deeply, Berkeley Square, the 2002 Christmas episode of Only Fools and Horses, Casualty and Skins being filmed there. Its latest appearance is in the BBC series Sherlock, as the venue for the wedding of John Watson and Mary Morstan in the second episode of the third season, "The Sign of Three".

== Notable former residents ==
- Euan Blair, son of Tony Blair
- James Landale, journalist
- Matt Lucas, comedian
- Susanna Reid, TV Journalist
- Alastair Summerlee

== See also ==
- Grade I listed buildings in Bristol
- Shell Grotto, Margate
