= Thomas Speed (Quaker) =

Thomas Speed (1623–1703) was a preacher and successful merchant who, along with Thomas Goldney I, was a leading figure in the first decade of Bristol Quakerism.

== Family and Education ==
Speed was the son of Richard Speed of Sherborne and educated at Sherborne School and Exeter College, Oxford.

== Career ==
After graduating from Oxford, Speed took the Covenant and became Minister of St Philip's, Bristol, until 1650 when his interest in Quakerism began and he became a merchant.

Speed and his friends had a difficult time in establishing Quakerism in Bristol, being subjected to abuse in both physical and pamphleteering forms, and defended themselves with no less vigour. Speed, along with Thomas Goldney I and others recorded how they were 'abused, dirted, stoned, pinched, kicked and otherwise greatly injured' in Cry of Blood published in 1656.

Even when they had established Quakerism in Bristol, some of its tenets continued to cause problems, many of which Speed was called upon to resolve. For example, because Quakers chose to adhere to the teaching 'Swear not at all', this caused difficulties when taking an oath was necessary to become a burgess of Bristol. In December 1674, Thomas Speed and Thomas Goldney were asked to look into the situation of young men who had served their apprenticeship in the city, who were debarred from their just liberties because their conscience forbade them to swear an oath.

Speed's four decades of highly successful trading as a merchant seems to have been built on a commercial culture based on the values of honesty and friendship rather than religious ideology or impersonal contract. This is exemplified in his accounts which were designed to help him keep track of obligations not to measure, still less to maximise, profits. Nevertheless, towards the end of his life he began to move away from Quakerism.

== Family life ==
Speed's daughter and heiress, Hannah, married Thomas Goldney II whose successors were made baronets of Beechfield and Bradenstoke Abbey, Wiltshire.

== See also ==
- History of the Quakers
