= George Hone-Goldney =

English lawyer and cricketer

George Hone Hone-Goldney (24 January 1851 – 28 March 1921) was an English lawyer and cricketer who played in two first-class cricket matches for Cambridge University in 1873 and a single match for an amateur side in 1876. He was born in Southborough, Kent and died at Winchester, Hampshire.

Hone-Goldney was a right-handed lower-order batsman and a right-arm medium pace bowler. He played in a lot of minor matches at Cambridge, but had appeared in only one first-class game when picked for the University match in 1873: in this game, he batted at No 11 and bowled only two overs, without success. He made a similarly scant impression in his third and final first-class match in 1876, though the game itself, between a team called The Gentlemen of the Marylebone Cricket Club and Kent, was rendered notable by the feat of W. G. Grace in scoring 344, the highest first-class score to that point and the first innings of more than 300.

== Family, name and career ==
Hone-Goldney was educated at Eton College and at Trinity Hall, Cambridge. He was a lawyer admitted to the Inner Temple in 1873 and called to the bar in 1877; he practised on the Oxford circuit.

His name throughout his adult life was "Hone-Goldney". His father, George Goldney, who also played some first-class cricket at Cambridge, at some point hyphenated his middle and family names and became known as "George Hone-Goldney"; this happened after George Hone Hone-Goldney's birth (hence the strange dittograph in his name) but before the son's arrival at Cambridge.
