= Frederick Goldney =

Goldney in Masonic regalia, c. 1915

Sir Frederick Hastings Goldney, 3rd Baronet of Beechfield and Bradenstoke Priory (26 May 1845 – 21 February 1940) was the second son of Gabriel Goldney, Conservative MP for Chippenham. The title passed to him on 4 May 1925 on the death of his brother, Gabriel Prior Goldney.

== Career ==
Goldney was educated at Harrow School and became a landowner and Freemason, rising to become Grand Deacon of England. He also wrote the books "A History of Freemasonry in Wiltshire" (1880) and "Records of Chippenham", privately published in 1889.

He was mayor of Chippenham in 1874 and 1888, High Sheriff of Wiltshire in 1908 and also served as a justice of the peace for Wiltshire and Surrey.

He married Ethel Julia Swayne, of Wilton, Wiltshire on 6 February 1875, and they had five children: Katherine Long Goldney (b. 1878), Mary Delarivière Goldney (b. 1880), Eveline Margaret Hungerford Goldney (b. 1882), Lucy Hulbert Goldney (b. 1889) and Henry Hastings Goldney (b. 1886).

His residences were Beechfield, Corsham, Wiltshire and Prior Place, Camberley, Surrey.

Baronetage of the United Kingdom
Preceded by Gabriel Prior Goldney	Baronet (of Beechfield and Bradenstoke Abbey); 1925 – 1940	Succeeded by Henry Hastings Goldney
