= William Champion (industrialist) =

English metallurgist

Warmley Works

William Champion 's (1709–1789) Warmley Brassworks is of national significance with the highest category as a Scheduled Monument.

== Warmley Quaker Industrial Village 1746 – 1769 ==
Established in 1746 by the Quaker industrialist William Champion, it was once the largest and most technologically advanced brass-manufacturing complexes in Europe. William Champion's significance extends beyond his with patenting a process for zinc and brass production. It combined Champion's manufacturing, water management, workers' housing, his family's home and landscaped garden.The first integrated industrial settlement where all the processes of brass production occurred on one site. and integrated the works and garden. Today it is recognised for its historical as well as industrial and architectural significance. Many of its remaining structures are designated as listed buildings, and many are at risk.

== Background ==
Champion's approach can be considered within the wider network of Quaker industrialist in Bristol and Coalbrookdale reflecting a Quaker industrial ethos with early technological innovation and community planning. His family had close commercial and religious connects with other Quaker families, including Darby's, Lloyds and Goldneys. Abraham Darby's and Richard Champion's documented involvement with the Bristol Quaker workhouse (1696), including financial support for its construction, and the later recorded visit of a member of the Champion family provide evidence of a shared institutional experience. This is significant because the Quaker workhouse embodied ideas of John Bellers' 1695 College of Industry concerning, training, education, welfare and community organisation.

== History ==
Brass was produced before Roman times, but its composition was not properly understood until the Renaissance. European brass making expanded in the post-medieval period, with water-powered hammers introduced to produce wares such as pots in Germany and the Netherlands. During the 16th and 17th centuries, the industry became established in England. Quakers including Abraham Darby brought skilled workers were brought over from the Netherlands to sites including Bristol Brass, Coalbrookdale, and Warmley.

== Early life ==
William Champion reported that he visited the manufacturing regions of continental Europe. Later accounts state that he spent several years in Holland and Germany studying brass and zinc manufacture, although the precise itinerary and the extent to which his subsequent zinc process derived from knowledge acquire on these travels remain uncertain.

On returning home in 1730, he become a junior partner in the Bristol Brass Company. The Champion family stood in special relationship to Coalbrookdale. They were the largest customers, and resold pots and kettles largely for export. William and John were very large merchants in bar iron and pig iron.

William experimented for six years to develop a process to create zinc – then known as spelter. He applied for, and was granted a July 1738 patent for his coal-furnace powered distillation process. His method was a scaled-up and coal fired development on the method used at the Zawar mines, in India, since the 12th century AD. The system remained in production for over 100 years.

== Baber's Tower 1738 ==
In 1738 he established his first attempt at manufacturing zinc at Baber's Tower, a few minutes away from the family house at 63 Old Market. The works were associated with the Bristol Brass Company, rather than being demonstrably wholly independent. By September 1742 he had produced significant quantities of zinc from six crucibles located in the furnace, at a cost of around £7,000.

In September 1742, local residents reported that the site was a 'common nuisance' to the city council, and importers flooded the market with cheap zinc. So William Champion closed the works.

== Warmley Works & Garden 1742 ==
His father, Nehemiah Champion married Martha Vandewall, the sister of Thomas Goldney III. in 1742. So Thomas Goldney III became William Champion's step-uncle. The Goldney family owned the land in Warmley, and in 1746 , William left the Bristol Brass Company and began to construct the Warmley Works. With tools and manufacturing equipment supplied by the Darby Ironworks at Coalbrookdale, over the next few years Warmley Works became the biggest metal processing plant in the world, with outputs of zinc, copper, brass and other metals.

William Champion physically intertwined the works and garden. Unlike Goldney's pleasure garden, it had few visitors. The garden were an integral part of Champion's industrial community. Its primary purpose was to support the brassworks and provide a healthy, self-sufficient environment for the workers and their families who lived on the site. Many features were dual purpose, being both functional for the industrial processes and part of the Dutch styled landscape. Many of the structures were built using recycle waste.

=== The Grotto ===
Only known hot Plunge Pool in one of largest Grottoes in Britain

One of England's largest surviving grottoes is of national importance, extending over 100 feet from entrance to the deepest point. It contains the country's only known hot plunge pool. Built with durable, heat retaining materials - including recycled black copper-slag blocks and furnace clinker for the walls rather than conventional decorative shells. it acted as an industrial hydrothermal spa for health, recreation, and relief for workers from the intense heat and noise of the works.

A Newcomen engine raised water from the waterwheels to a pool, that then went underground before cascading 20 feet down before filling a deep square hot plunge pool, two plunge pools, and a long bath. From the central chamber rustic archways open into surrounding rooms, featuring 12 feet high faces possibly as Quaker allegories and today described as grotesque faces.

=== Workers' Housing - The Row or The Rank ===
This terrace of 13 purpose built workers' houses is amongst the earliest in Britain. Each house had 3 storeys, with room measuring about 13 ft by 13 ft, with a smaller rear half room 6ft 6 ins used as a kitchen. The total floor area was about 592 sq feet (55 square metres).The scale and quality were exceptional and remained comparable with other workers' housing for 140 years, until Bournville village (1893).

The buildings featured symmetrical public facades facing out, with back slag blocks as quoins and wind sills. The rear used cheaper materials, giving rise the description 'brick backs'.

Similar housing terraces were built at nearby Mill Lane, Bitton (demolished 1968) and Kelston. The terrace was demolished for road widening in 1968, its foundations and long individual gardens lie below a carpark, the road and buildings.

=== Statue of Neptune ===
Neptune 'Warmley Giant' Largest garden statue in Britain

Considered Britain's largest garden statue and one of the earliest surviving concrete structures.Standing approximately 30 feet (10metres) tall, the Grade II listed "Warmley Giant" was constructed by Champion using recycled materials. standing at the centre of a 13 acre artificial lake. Facing the works, where the large brass basins - called 'Neptunes' - were produced for the transatlantic slave trade.

Glistening white cement and plaster formed the face chest and arms. In contrast, the hair, cloak, and lower body were created using rough black industrial cinders and clinker waste - the glassy, stony residue from smelting.

=== Windmill ===
Oldest Industrial Windmill in Britain

It is recognised as the first non-agricultural, ore-crushing windmill to be built in England, and the surviving masonry tower remains the country's oldest and most complete surviving industrial windmill structure of its type. It operated a stamping system to crush raw calamine and copper ores prior to smelting. It is a prominent landmark, giving the area its modern name "Warmley Tower"

=== Icehouse ===
Largest 18th century Icehouse in Britain

One of the largest in the country, it is the earliest of the few commercial ice houses still in existence. It was used to store ice harvested from the lake so that the water power would not cease. It was then used for domestic and commercial use.Predominantly subterranean structure, 35 feet (10m) in diameter and 20 feet (6m deep), the lower 3.5m is below ground level.

=== The Clocktower and Factory ===
Early industrial clocktower

The clocktower is the earliest surviving purpose built industrial clock tower. Constructed around 1746, it makes extensive use of recycled black blocks and is part of the first integrated factory, housing all stages of the pin manufacturing under one roof.

The Clocktower, with its 1764 bell, represented one of the earliest physical shifts away from agrarian labour towards time-regulated factory work for the children, women and men. Grade ii listed.

=== The Summer House ===
Possibly the earliest surviving example where a gatehouse controlled the water flow into the lake, pond and canal system, the stellated building constructed from copper slag blocks, resembling a small castle, with integrated productive and ornamental landscapes. The building overlooked the water level, powering the waterwheels. It may have been the home for the keeper.

=== Chequered Wall Garden ===
Chequered Wall Garden

A decorative wall built of clincher and slag blocks in a chequered design. It may have reflected Quaker links with botanists.

=== Boathouse ===
Boathouse next to Echo Pond/Lake

A structure built from copper slag blocks, situated near the Echo Pond. It is awaiting repairs to the missing roof.

=== The Mound ===
A raised viewing mound (also known as a snail mound) was a typical 18th century garden feature offfering a view over the reservoir/lake and walks.

== Kingswood, Kelston, and Bitton 1761 ==
William continued to expand the business through development at both the Warmley site, as well as new furnaces at Kingswood, a forge at Kelston near the River Avon, and a battery mill at Bitton on the River Boyd. By 1754, he had:

15 copper furnaces 12 brass furnaces; 4 spelter or zinc furnace; a battery mill or small mill for kettles; rolling mills for making plates; rolling and cutting mills for wire; and a wire mill of both thick and fine drawn kinds.

== Champion's Dock 1765 ==
Champion's Dock

By 1765, with excess capital on his hands, William commenced development of a new dock at Rownham on the eastern bank of the River Avon, which would be capable of holding 36 large ships. However, after the increased cost of construction depleted his resources, and with a distinct lack of trade, he sold the dock in 1770 to the Merchant Venturers for £1,770, who renamed it The Merchants' Dock.

== Bristol's Floating Harbour ==
During the dock's construction, William had also proposed creating a complete floating harbour at Bristol, by building lock gates on the River Avon where it junctioned with the River Frome. However, the plan was abandoned due to an estimated cost of £37,000.

== Downfall ==
Companies sought capital for a range of enterprises. Banks, as in Bristol financed trade (such as slave trade) with short, high returns rather than long term industrial projects that yielded profits more slowly.

William Champion wrote to one of the leading partners of the Bristol Brass Company complaining that he had been needlessly deprived of coal - as well as his men being bribed to reveal his patent secrets and introduced unfair discounts. In response, in 1761 he invited three non Quaker 'Lords of the Colleries' to be partners and for expansion at Kingswood, Bitton and Kelston.

The profits were less than expected, and it was necessary to borrow at high interest rates to run the company. In April 1767, he applied to Parliament to become'incorporated' and so be able to raise £400,000 through issuing shares. This would raise money to finance running costs and to expand much further. At that time, the law allowed other companies and groups to block such fund raising. After lengthy proceedings, and at a considerable time and cost, the opposition by Bristol Brass Company and others succeeded in stopping this. So additional funding could not be raised through the issuing of shares.

Stating to have a capital of £200,000 and to give employment to about 2,000 people.

The company had been formed before the Bubble Act 1720, (Note: Companies formed after this act were required to obtain an act of incorporation, in an attempt to limit the setting-up of dubious speculative companies and the financial crisis of the South Sea Bubble.) and in 1767 petitioned Parliament to change its status to incorporation. In return, the partners offered to invest another £200,000 worth of capital, including £30,000 into the production of brass pins. This brought about the combined wrath of other metal companies formed under the Bubble Act 1720, as well as the pin makers of Gloucester, who petitioned that such an investment was 50% greater than their existing facilities. In April 1767 the Commons issued a warrant that gave authority for the preparation of a charter of incorporation, but this was countered by the competitors. After lengthy legal proceeding, a second warrant was issued by the Attorney General in October 1767. This led to a further counter-petition, which claimed that the Warmley Company would become a monopoly. By March 1768, the opposition had won and no further steps were taken to obtain a charter of incorporation.

Due to the collapse of the process to incorporate, in April 1768 William's partners discovered that he had tried to withdraw part of his capital without permission, and he was instantly dismissed from the company. Because he could not pay his debts William Champion was declared bankrupt.

Now a debt-encased and loss-making enterprise, on 11 March 1769 the Warmley Works were offered for sale in Felix Farley's Bristol Journal. Sold to the Harford & Bristol Copper Company, they also obtained the rights to Champion's patents. Using the process but winding down the operations until 1809, they later sold the Bitton Battery Mill in 1825 for use as a paper mill.

Because of the American War of Independence, the price of tar greatly increased, which was used at the time as a sealant on ships. On 29 April 1780 an advert appeared in Sarah Farley's Journal offering for sale a process of making English tar, from the estate of the deceased William Champion. Later, a tar works was established within Bristol Harbour. He died in 1789.

== Legacy ==
William Champion's development of Warmley Brassworks sits within a trajectory of Quaker socio-economic reform connecting 17th Century radicalism to the modern welfare state. Inheriting the egalitarian principles outlined in John Bellers' Proposal for Raising a College of Industry - first tested locally at the Bristol Quaker Workhouse in1696 - Warmley embodied Bellers' vision as Europe's first fully integrated industrial village, combining raw material processing, manufacturing, workers' housing and community infrastructure.

Unlike Victorian paternalistic model villages (e.g. Bournville) or worker co-operatives, 18th century Quaker sites like Warmley and Coalbrookdale operated as privately owned enterprises bound by shared religious identity, trust and intermarried family networks across Bristol and the Midlands.

Rooted in Bellers' view that workers were the primary source of wealth, and a healthy educated workforce was essential for long-term profit, these communities fostered a shared moral identity by collapsing the distance between owner and worker.

While no surviving documentation proves Champion explicitly copied Coalbrookdale (e.g. where the Darby family held Quaker meetings with workers in their own home) or the Bristol Quaker Workhouse, their overlapping networks and integrated functional design strongly link Warmley to a broader Quaker industrial tradition. This model later influenced Cadbury and Rowntree, whose empirical poverty studies shaped British social policy and established an intellectual line from Warmley to the modern welfare state.

== See also ==
- National Smelting Company
