= George Goldney =

English clergyman and cricketer

George Hone Goldney (baptised 23 January 1816 – 22 October 1871) was an English clergyman who played in a single first-class cricket match for Cambridge University in 1838. His exact birthdate is not known, but he was baptised at Buckingham and died in London.

The record for Goldney's one first-class cricket match is incomplete: it is known that he batted just once, scoring 5; there is no record whether he bowled or kept wicket, and nor is it known whether he was right- or left-handed.

== Family, name and career ==
Goldney was educated at Eton College and at King's College, Cambridge. He was a Fellow at King's from 1838 to 1850 and was also ordained as a Church of England clergyman, though he did not take up any church post. At some point, he hyphenated his middle and family names and became known as "George Hone-Goldney"; his son, who also played some first-class cricket at Cambridge, was known as "George Hone Hone-Goldney" by the time he arrived at the university.
