= Sir Gabriel Goldney, 1st Baronet =

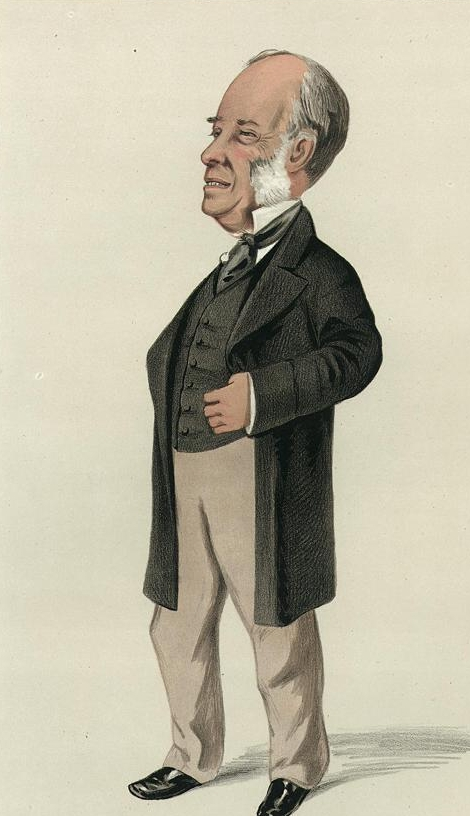
Caricature of Goldney by 'Delfico' in Vanity Fair magazine, 1872

Sir Gabriel Goldney, 1st Baronet (25 July 1813 – 8 May 1900) was a British landowner, financier and banker who sat in the House of Commons from 1865 to 1885 for the Conservative Party. He was created a baronet in May 1880.

== Ancestry and early life ==
The Goldney family, from Bristol, became clothiers in Chippenham, Wiltshire, in the sixteenth century and were long afterwards associated with that county, and particularly the town. An ancestor, Henry Goldney, had also been a Member of Parliament for Chippenham and was in 1553 appointed the first "bayliff" of Chippenham. A 17th-century ancestor, also named Gabriel, left bequests in his will to provide "greatcoats for six poor inhabitants".

Goldney was born on 25 July and baptised at Chippenham on 3 December 1813. His father was Harry Goldney (1774–1852) and his mother Elizabeth (née Reade, c. 1789–1863). He was educated at Christ's Hospital (of which he later became a governor) from 1820 to 1828.

Goldney married Mary Anne Alexander in Corsham on 16 September 1839, and they had four children: Mary Catherine Goldney (14 October 1841 – 4 August 1854), Gabriel Prior Goldney (b. 4 August 1843), Frederick Hastings Goldney (b. 26 May 1845), and John Tankerville Goldney (b. 15 June 1846).

== Career ==
Goldney became a landowner, financier and banker. In 1854 he bought Sheldon Manor and in 1856, land in Hilmarton. His investments extended outside Wiltshire to Camberley in Surrey, as in 1860 he advanced money to develop a silk farm at Heatherside; when the venture failed, Goldney foreclosed on his investment and took possession of the land, part of which later became Prior Park, Camberley, the residence of his two elder sons.

In 1863 he bought land at Bradenstoke Abbey from Frederick Methuen, 2nd Baron Methuen, and the following year, bought Stanley Abbey from John Bayntun Starkey. By 1888 he also owned land at Monks Park, Corsham, which he leased for quarrying.

He was first elected as Conservative Member of Parliament for Chippenham on 11 July 1865 and made his maiden speech on 20 April 1866. By this time, he was a Director of the North Wilts Bank. In this capacity, he was persuaded by railway engineer Rowland Brotherhood to relax the bank's conditions on his overdraft in return for help in getting Goldney re-elected in the forthcoming election; Goldney, having been re-elected, then advised the bank that the conditions could be relaxed. However, shortly after this, in 1869, the bank changed its mind, and Brotherhood's enterprise failed; Brotherhood blamed Goldney for this. Goldney was appointed a Deputy Lieutenant of Wiltshire on 22 February 1869.

The position of Bailiff of Chippenham passed down to Goldney; he was also a Freemason, holding the office of Grand Warden of England. He was created Baronet Goldney of Beechfield in the parish of Corsham, and Bradenstoke Abbey in the parish of Lyneham on 30 April 1880.

He died at Eaton Place, Belgravia, London on 8 May 1900, and the baronetcy passed to his first son, Gabriel Prior Goldney.

== Legacy ==
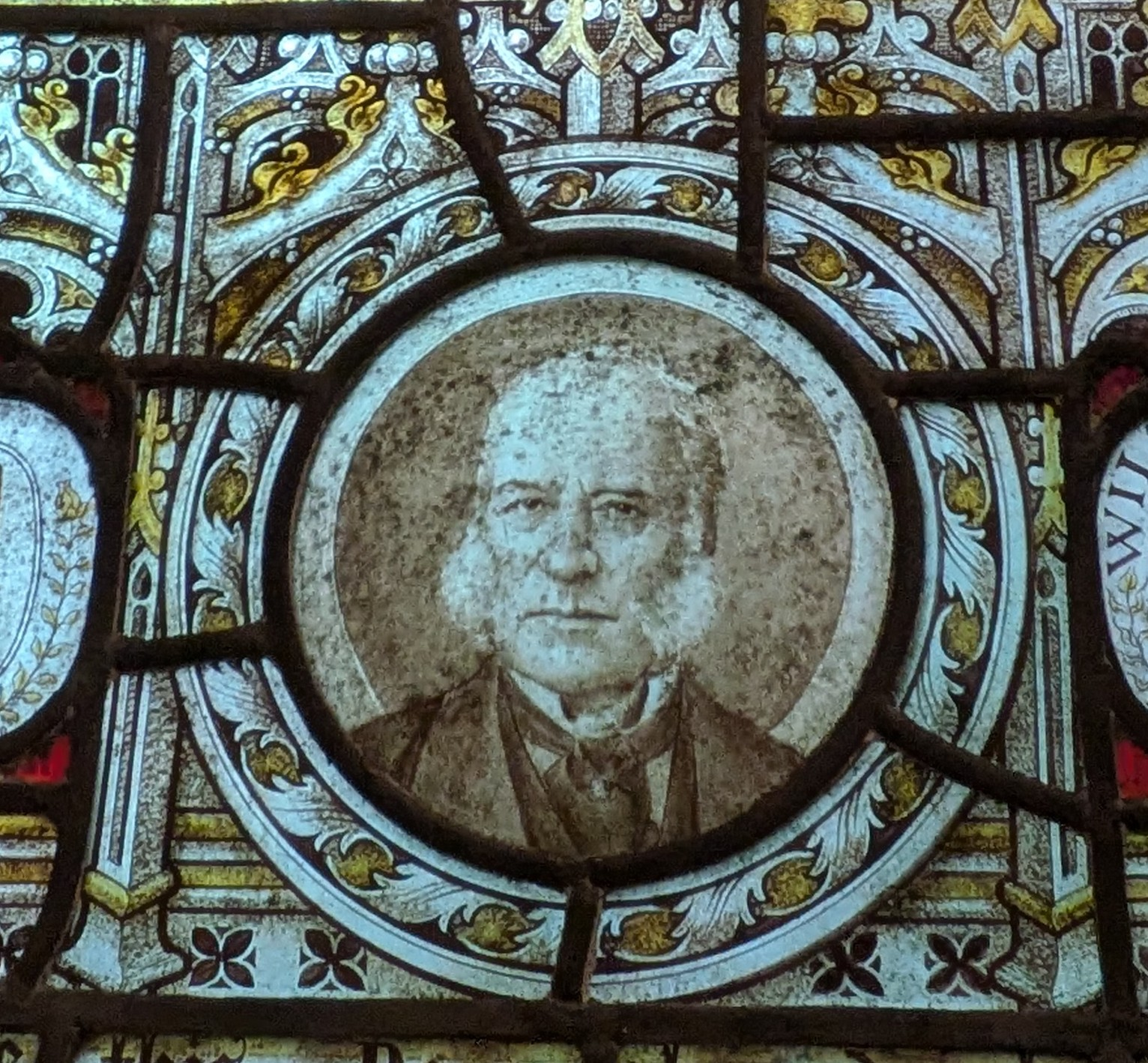
Part of the memorial window in St Andrew's Church

Goldney is commemorated in a stained-glass window of St Andrew's Church, Chippenham, the parish church. His coat-of-arms appears in a window of the Foundling Hospital, London, where he was a governor. He is commemorated in the name of Goldney Avenue, Chippenham.

Parliament of the United Kingdom
| Preceded by Richard Penruddocke Long; William John Lysley | Member of Parliament for Chippenham; 1865–1885; With: Sir John Neeld 1865–1868 (representation reduced to one member 1868) | Succeeded by Bannister Fletcher |
Baronetage of the United Kingdom
| New creation | Baronet (of Beechfield and Bradenstoke Abbey); 1880–1900 | Succeeded by Gabriel Prior Goldney |
