= John Goldney =

British barrister (1846–1920)

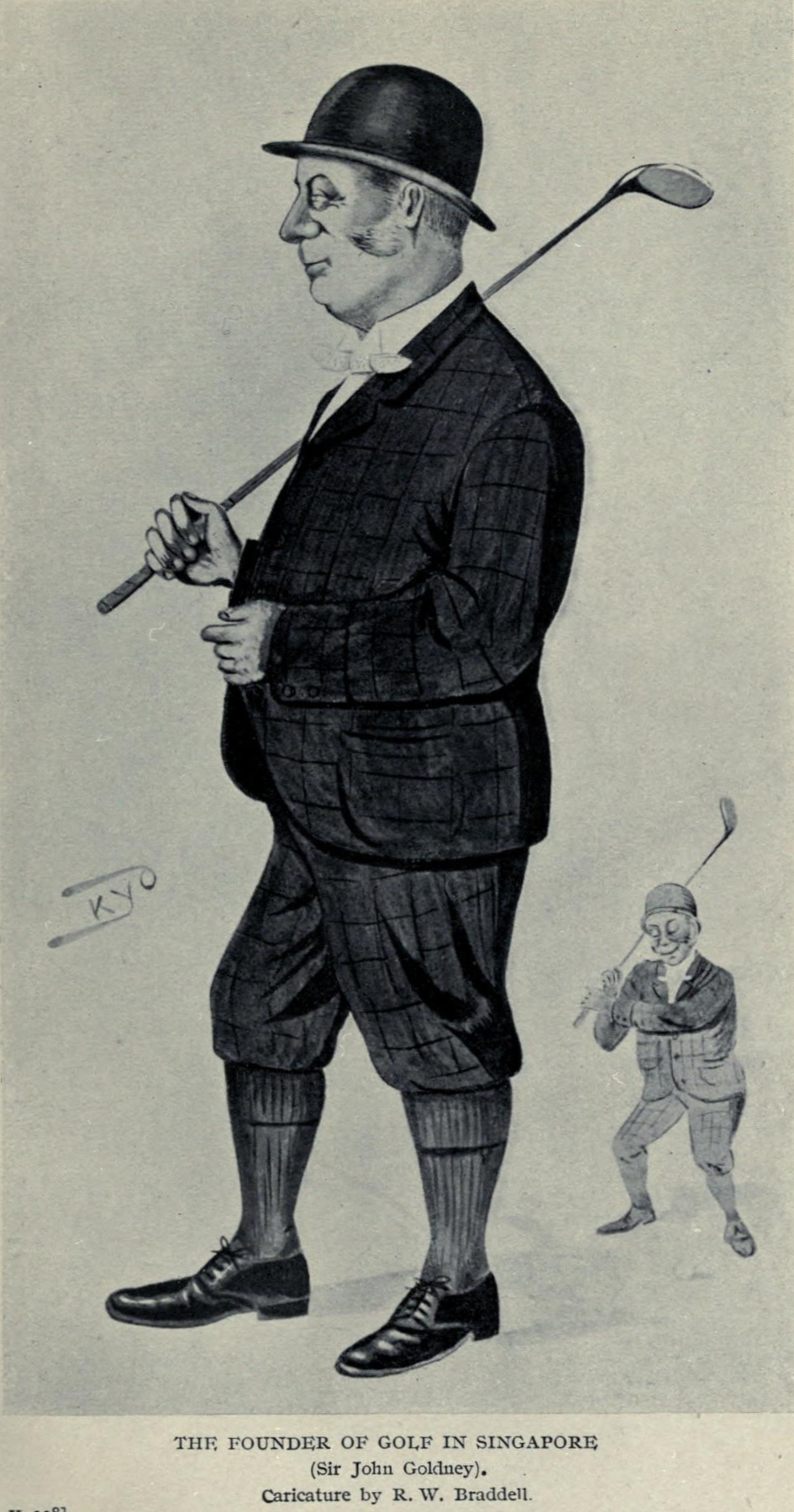
Caricature by R.W. Braddell

Sir John Tankerville Goldney (15 June 1846 – 11 April 1920) was a British barrister who rose to be Chief Justice of Trinidad and Tobago, and was also High Sheriff of Wiltshire in 1910. He is also notable for introducing golf to Singapore in 1891.

== Early life ==
He was the third son of Sir Gabriel Goldney, 1st Baronet of Beechfield, Corsham and Bradenstoke Abbey (both Wiltshire) and Mary Anne (née Alexander). He was born on 15 June 1846 and baptised at Corsham on 14 July.

Goldney attended Harrow School, studied at Trinity College, Cambridge, and was called to the bar by Inner Temple on 30 April 1869. On 9 February 1875 he married Jane MacGregor Laird, daughter of John Laird, Member of Parliament for Birkenhead, where he lived for a while.

== Legal career ==
In April 1880 he was appointed Attorney General of the Leeward Islands and translated to acting Chief Justice in 1881; in 1883 he was appointed a judge of the High Court of British Guiana, where he served until 1887.

Goldney served as Chief Justice for the Straits Settlements from 1887 to 1892. It is believed that having brought golf clubs with him, Goldney noticed there was no course in Singapore where he could use them; accordingly, he proposed that part of the Singapore Sporting Club's land be used for golf; this was accepted and a nine-hole course was laid out. Goldney became the first president of the club, which he inaugurated by driving the first ball.

In 1892, he was appointed Chief Justice of Trinidad and Tobago and was honoured as a Knight Bachelor in the following year. He resigned his office in 1899 and returned to England, where he was appointed High Sheriff of Wiltshire for 1910 and a Justice of the Peace for the same county.

He died on 11 April 1920 and was buried at St Bartholomew's Church, Corsham alongside other members of his family.

== See also ==
- Goldney baronets

Legal offices
Preceded by Sir John Gorrie	Chief Justice of Trinidad and Tobago; 1892–1899	Succeeded by Sir William John Anderson
