= Goldney River =

River in New Zealand

Coordinates: 43°17′07″S 171°32′04″E

- Location of the mouth within New Zealand

Location
- Country: New Zealand

Physical characteristics
- Source
  - location: Craigieburn Range
- Mouth
  - location: Lake Coleridge

The Goldney River is a river in the Canterbury region of New Zealand. It arises on the southern slopes of the Craigieburn Range and flows south into Lake Coleridge. The Goldney family were early squatters in the area.

== See also ==
- List of rivers of New Zealand
