= Lyneham, Wiltshire =

Village in Wiltshire, England

Coordinates: 51.507°N 1.966°W

Lyneham
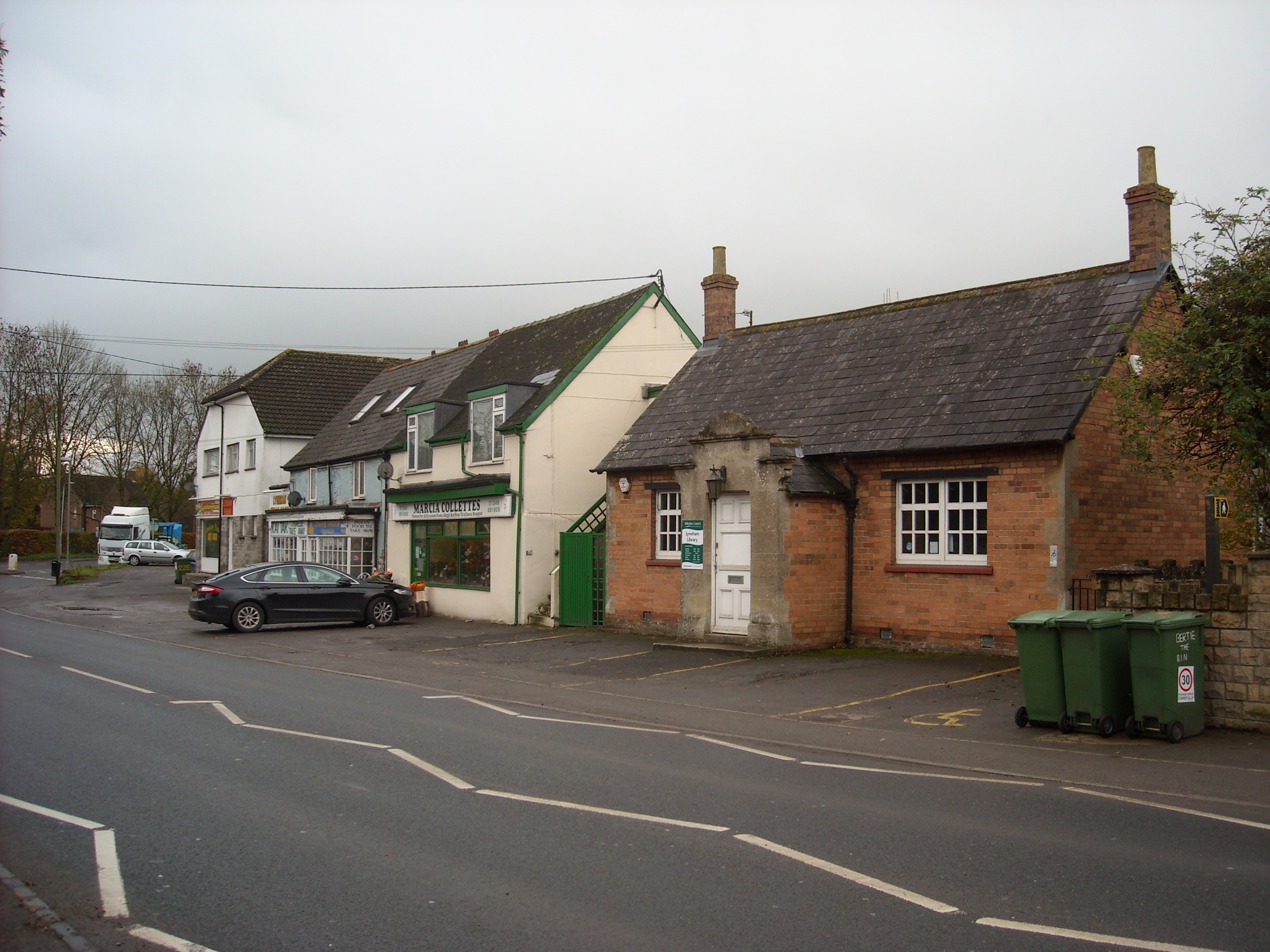
- Shops and library, Lyneham, 2015

- Location within Wiltshire
- Population: 6,192 (2021 Census)
- OS grid reference: SU025787
- Civil parish: Lyneham and Bradenstoke
- Unitary authority: Wiltshire
- Ceremonial county: Wiltshire
- Region: South West
- Country: England
- Sovereign state: United Kingdom
- Post town: Chippenham
- Postcode district: SN15
- Dialling code: 01249
- Police: Wiltshire
- Fire: Dorset and Wiltshire
- Ambulance: South Western
- UK Parliament: Chippenham
- Website: Parish Council

Lyneham is a large village in north Wiltshire, England, within the civil parish of Lyneham and Bradenstoke, and situated 4 miles (6.4 km) southwest of Royal Wootton Bassett, 5.5 miles (8.9 km) north of Calne and 11 miles (18 km) southwest of Swindon. The village is on the A3102 road between Calne and Wootton Bassett.

The part of Lyneham village close to the parish church is known as Church End. The civil parish includes the village of Bradenstoke and the hamlets of Preston and The Banks.

== History ==
In 1086, Domesday Book recorded 42 households at Stoche in the northwest of the modern parish. Earthworks in this area known as Clack Mount, including a mound 20 metres in diameter, could be from a Norman motte-and-bailey castle, although the early history is uncertain. Bradenstoke Priory was founded nearby in 1142, possibly on the site of an earlier chapel. The hamlet on both sides of the road leading to the priory was called Clack from the 14th century, as shown on Andrews' and Dury's map of 1773; in the 20th century the name Bradenstoke was applied to the whole of this area.

Lyneham, about a mile east of Bradenstoke, was first mentioned in 1224. In the east of the parish there was a medieval settlement at Littlecott, on the border with Hilmarton; by 1773 this had shrunk to two farms.

Preston hamlet, about a mile southeast of Lyneham, has two farmhouses from the 17th and 18th centuries.

In 1940, much farmland became an RAF station, extending close to the western edge of Lyneham village.

A National School was built opposite St Michael's church in 1861, replacing an earlier school; average attendance in 1902 was 103. A new primary school was built on adjoining land in 1953, and an infants' school nearby in 1965. The Victorian building continued in use for a while but by 2017 housed commercial offices. In 2018, Wiltshire Council proposed to enlarge Lyneham Primary School to have 630 places, to cater for Army relocations to MoD Lyneham and the leasing of surplus service family houses.

The parish boundary in the northeast ran along the lane through Tockenham village, thus the manorial estates known as West Tockenham were within Lyneham parish. In 1969 the boundary was redrawn closer to Lyneham, uniting Tockenham Court Farm with the rest of Tockenham.

== Churches ==
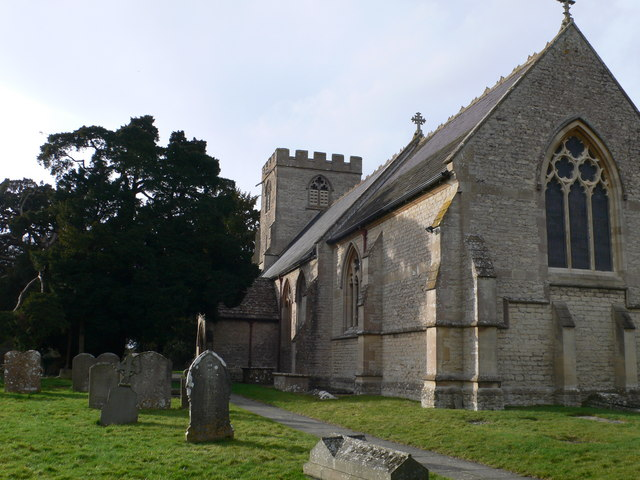
Church of St Michael

A church at Lyneham is first mentioned in 1182, belonging to Bradenstoke Priory. The present Church of England parish church of St Michael and All Angels dates from the 14th century. Restoration by William Butterfield in 1862–5 included the rebuilding of the chancel and the re-roofing of the nave.

In the 14th-century tower are six bells: one dated c.1450 and two from the 17th century. Stained glass in the east window is by Alexander Gibbs. A 1990 window in the south aisle by Henry Haig commemorates the 50th anniversary of RAF Lyneham.

As the settlement at Clack was distant from the parish church, a church dedicated to St Mary the Virgin was built there in 1866. In the same year an ecclesiastical parish called Bradenstoke-cum-Clack was created for it, from parts of the parishes of Lyneham and Christian Malford. In 1924 the chapelry of Bradenstoke-cum-Clack, the vicarage of Lyneham, and the rectory of Tockenham were united to form one benefice, although the parishes remained separate. In 1954, Tockenham became a separate parish and the parish of Lyneham with Bradenstoke was created.

A Methodist church was built in 1934 at The Green, Lyneham.

== RAF Lyneham ==
The former RAF Lyneham station, now MoD Lyneham, is adjacent to Lyneham village, to the south and east. The RAF's C-130 Hercules fleet was based here until June 2011 and C-17 Globemasters from RAF Brize Norton made frequent visits. In 2012 all operations were transferred to Brize Norton in west Oxfordshire, 35 miles (56 km) to the north. The site is now home to the Defence Technical Training College, which became operational in September 2015.

== Local government ==
The civil parish elects a parish council called Lyneham and Bradenstoke Parish Council. The parish is in the area of Wiltshire Council unitary authority, which is responsible for all significant local government functions.

An electoral division of Wiltshire Council called Lyneham stretches south east from the Lyneham and Bradenstoke to take in Clyffe Pypard parish. The total population at the time of the 2011 census was 5,460.

== Climate ==
Climate data for Lyneham, 145m asl (1991-2020)
Month	Jan	Feb	Mar	Apr	May	Jun	Jul	Aug	Sep	Oct	Nov	Dec	Year
Mean daily maximum °C (°F)	7.2 (45.0)	7.7 (45.9)	10.2 (50.4)	13.2 (55.8)	16.4 (61.5)	19.4 (66.9)	21.5 (70.7)	21.0 (69.8)	18.3 (64.9)	14.2 (57.6)	10.1 (50.2)	7.5 (45.5)	13.9 (57.0)
Mean daily minimum °C (°F)	1.7 (35.1)	1.6 (34.9)	3.0 (37.4)	4.7 (40.5)	7.5 (45.5)	10.4 (50.7)	12.4 (54.3)	12.3 (54.1)	10.2 (50.4)	7.6 (45.7)	4.4 (39.9)	2.1 (35.8)	6.5 (43.7)
Average rainfall mm (inches)	76.7 (3.02)	56.0 (2.20)	51.9 (2.04)	52.7 (2.07)	57.8 (2.28)	54.9 (2.16)	60.2 (2.37)	65.6 (2.58)	55.1 (2.17)	79.5 (3.13)	82.0 (3.23)	78.6 (3.09)	771 (30.34)
Average rainy days (≥ 1.0 mm)	13.0	10.9	9.9	10.1	9.8	9.3	9.7	10.2	9.7	12.4	13.4	13.3	131.7
Mean monthly sunshine hours	60.6	78.9	124.5	172.9	210.9	205.2	215.2	192.7	154.1	112.9	70.7	54.4	1,653
Source: Met Office
