= Sir Henry Goldney, 4th Baronet =

Sir Henry Hastings Goldney, 4th Baronet, MC (3 July 1886 – 26 February 1974) was the only son of Sir Frederick Hastings Goldney, 3rd Baronet. He inherited the title on 21 February 1940 on his father's death.

== Life ==
Goldney married Violetta Alyns Barnes (1886–1965) on 19 June 1916; they had no children.

He served in the Royal Engineers, and as a second lieutenant was awarded the Military Cross on 26 January 1917 for "conspicuous gallantry in action. He displayed great courage and skill in marking out assembly positions under very heavy fire, thereby materially assisting in the success of the operations."

Goldney died in 1974 and is buried at St Bartholomew's Church, Corsham, alongside other members of his family.

Baronetage of the United Kingdom
Preceded by Frederick Hastings Goldney	Baronet (of Beechfield and Bradenstoke Abbey); 1940 – 1974	Extinct
