= Sir Gabriel Goldney, 2nd Baronet =

Sir Gabriel Prior Goldney, 2nd Baronet, CB, CVO (4 August 1843 – 4 May 1925) was the first son of Gabriel Goldney, a Conservative MP for Chippenham. He inherited the title in 1900 upon his father's death.

== Career ==
Goldney studied at Exeter College, Oxford, and qualified as a barrister at the Inner Temple. He was appointed as a Royal Commissioner for the Norwich Election Enquiry of 1875 to investigate alleged corruption, and the following year, he became the Recorder of Helstone. In 1879, he was appointed Recorder of Poole, but he resigned from that position in 1882.

His other appointments included Remembrancer for the City of London from 1882 to February 1903, J.P. for Wiltshire and Deputy Lieutenant for the City of London in 1894. He was appointed High Sheriff of Wiltshire in 1906 and held the rank of Major in the Royal Wiltshire Yeomanry. He was an active Freemason and also received the honour of Companion of the Order of the Bath (CB) in July 1902 as well as being named a Commander of the Royal Victorian Order (CVO) in the 1904 New Year Honours.

Upon his death in 1925, the baronetcy passed to his younger brother Frederick.

Baronetage of the United Kingdom
Preceded by Gabriel Goldney	Baronet (of Beechfield and Bradenstoke Abbey); 1900 – 1925	Succeeded by Frederick Hastings Goldney
