= Bradenstoke Priory =

Medieval priory of Augustinian canons in Wiltshire, England

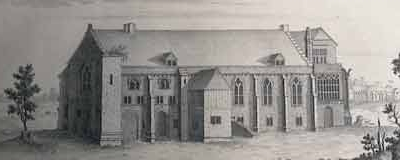
- 18th-century engraving of the Priory by Samuel and Nathaniel Buck
- Interactive map of Bradenstoke Priory

Monastery information
- Order: Augustinian
- Established: 1142
- Disestablished: 1539
- Dedication: St. Mary

People
- Founder: Walter FitzEdward de Salisbury

Site
- Location: Bradenstoke, Wiltshire, England
- Coordinates: 51°30′44″N 2°00′13″W
- Visible remains: Tower and undercroft
- Public access: Yes, 1st Sunday of each month

Bradenstoke Priory was a medieval priory of Augustinian canons regular in the village of Bradenstoke, Wiltshire, England. Its site, in the north of the county about 1 1/2 miles (2.4 km) west of Lyneham, is on a ridge above the south side of Dauntsey Vale. In the 1930s the property was purchased by William Randolph Hearst and some of its structures were used by him for the renovation of St Donat's Castle near Llantwit Major, Wales.

== Foundation and four centuries of life ==
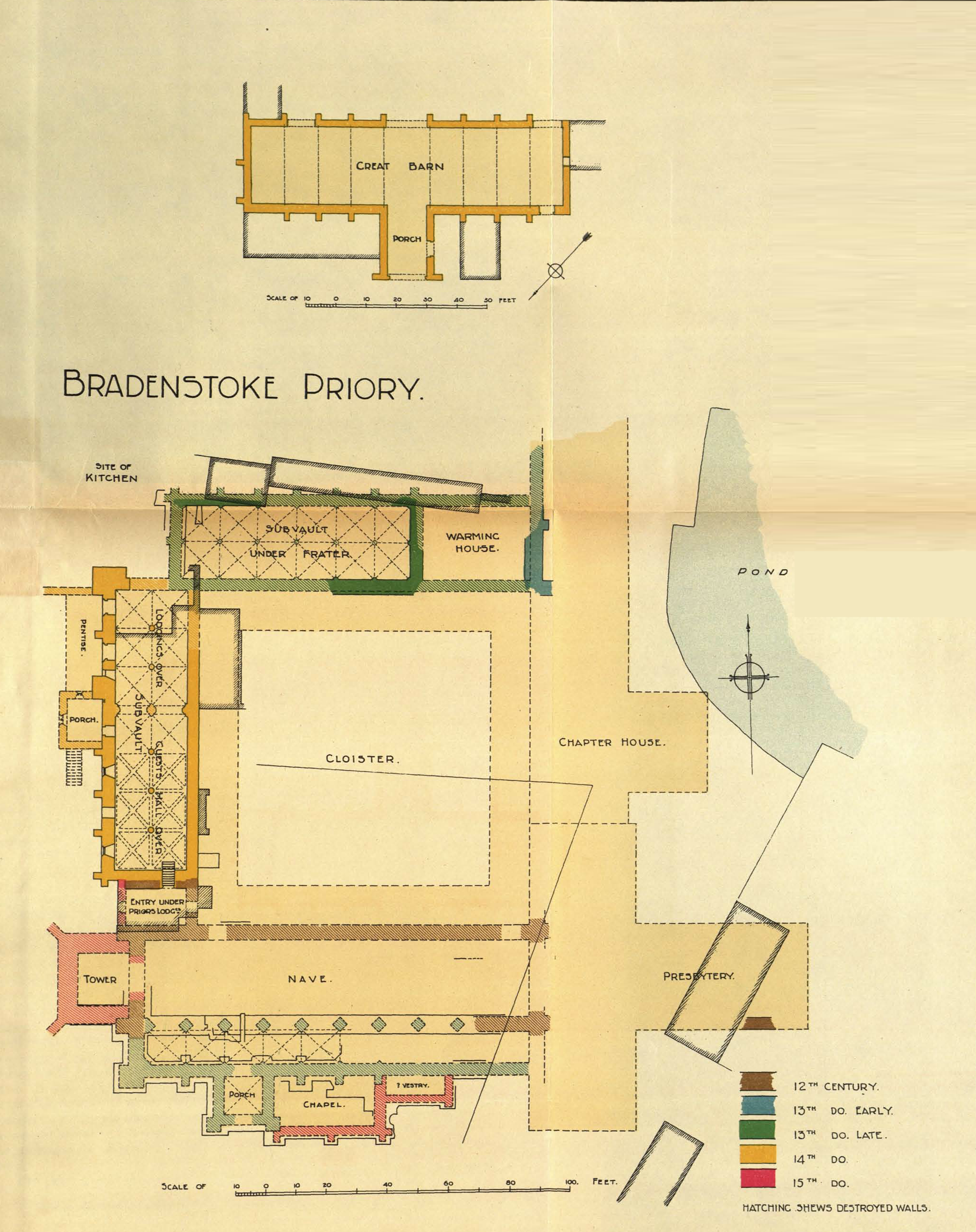
Ground Plan of the priory, from Brakspear (1923)

The priory was founded in 1142 as the Augustinian priory of Clack, and dedicated to Saint Mary. It was well-sited on a high ridge near a holy well, with further springs nearby; there is some evidence that a chapel of the era of Henry I already existed at the holy well.

The founder, Walter FitzEdward de Salisbury, was the son of Edward de Salisbury, a High Sheriff of Wiltshire; he gave lands for a priory as a daughter house of St. Mary's Abbey, Cirencester, according to its charter, "to serve God forever!". After the death of his wife, he "took the tonsure and habit of the canons" and on his death in 1147, was buried in the Priory, near the choir. His descendants, the Earls of Salisbury remained closely connected with the priory for many years. John FitzGilbert Marshal, father of William "The Greatest Knight" was buried in the Priory in 1165. In 1190 thirteen of the canons migrated to form the first community of Cartmel Priory, now in Cumbria, which had been recently founded by William Marshal, Earl of Pembroke.

Throughout most of its early history, the priory also enjoyed royal support, being granted a charter by Henry II some time between 1173 and 1179; Richard I also lent assistance for the priory to break away from the abbot of Cirencester to become a priory in its own right, and King John, a frequent visitor, intervened to confirm this secession. This tradition continued with the grant of royal protection by Henry III, who visited in 1235.

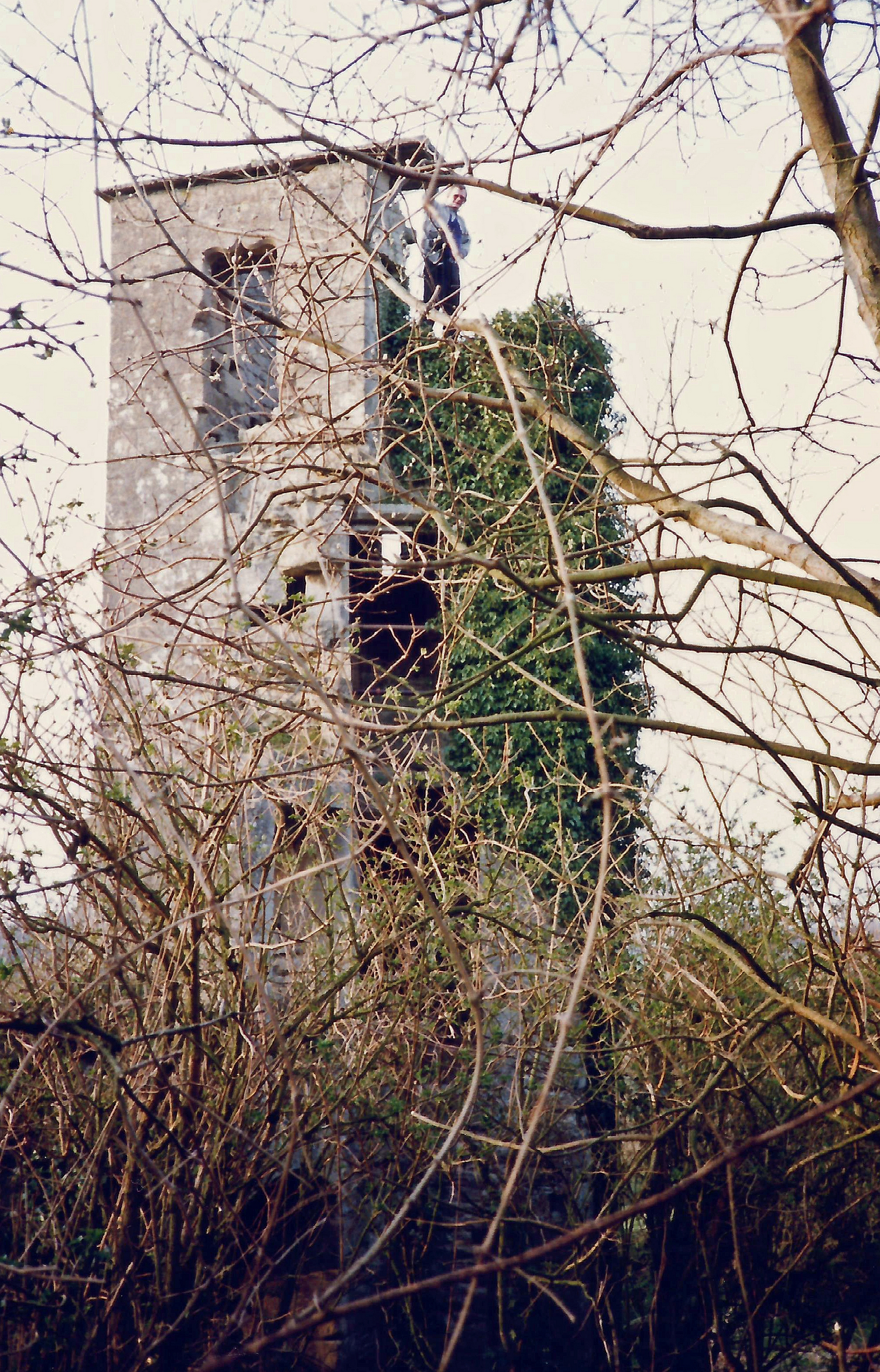
The tower

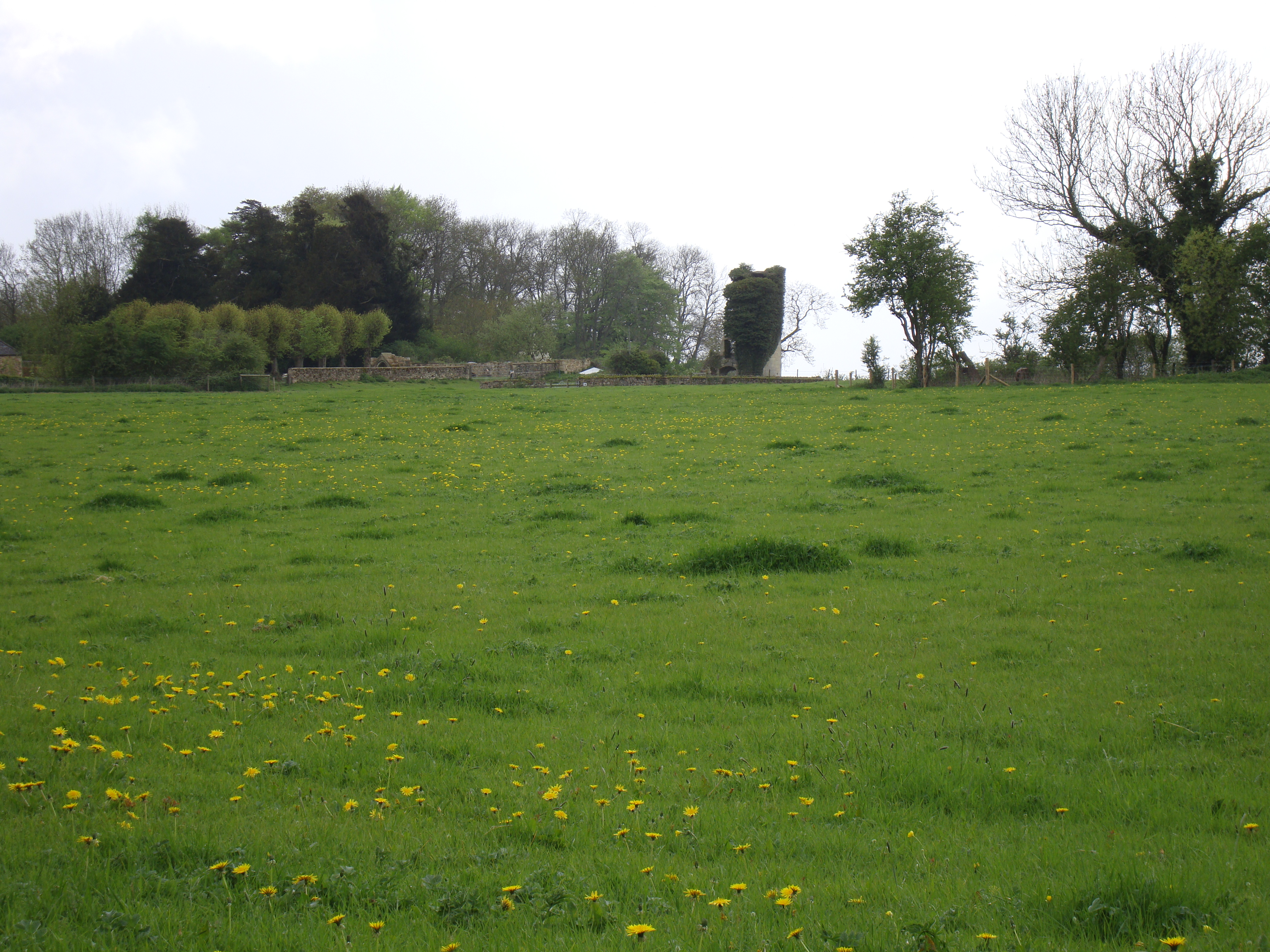
Bradenstoke Priory and demesne

By the 14th century, Bradenstoke Priory had gained wealth and lands in nine counties besides Wiltshire. This does not imply that the community lived in luxury or were corrupt. It was not a backwater, since in its latter years it had benefitted from the residence of its then prior, Thomas Wallashe, in the household of Cardinal Bainbridge, Archbishop of York, during his embassy in Rome (1509–1514), leading to grant of extensive papal privileges to the priory.

== The Dissolution ==
At first it seemed that Bradenstoke Priory would escape the Dissolution of the Monasteries, and the last prior, William Snowe, wrote to Thomas Cromwell thanking him for saving the monastery. However, the priory was suppressed as a religious institution and surrendered by prior Snowe and thirteen canons on 17 January 1539. At about this time, its total income was £270 10s 8d, or at least £212 in 1535. The property then passed from the Crown to a Richard Pexel (or Pecsall) and his heirs sold it to the Methuen family of Corsham. The priory's estate at Wilcot, some 14 miles to the southeast, was bought in 1549 by John Berwick, a member of the Seymour entourage who had previously sat as a Member of Parliament.

Prior Snowe was granted a Crown pension on 24 April 1539, and was later appointed Dean of Bristol (1542–1551).

John Aubrey described the priory as "Very well built, with good strong ribs", and having a cellar "the stateliest in Wiltshire". But he added "the very fundations [sic] of this fair church are now, 1666, digged up, where I saw severall freestone coffins ... and severall capitalls and bases of handsome Gothique pillars. On the west end of the hall was the King's lodgeings, which they say were very noble, and standing about 1588."

Recent archaeological and pictorial analysis of the extant remains reveals that they had been embellished by c. 1732, probably by Sir John Danvers, who is also likely to have been the designer of the associated formal gardens around the ‘pleasaunce’ known as Clack Mount. Danvers added an Italianate tower, a barrel vault incorporating spolia, a faux garderobe turret and an internal arched buttress of brickwork (demolished since 2003) to create a pre-Piranesi ‘dungeon’. Later embellishments were added by Sir Gabriel Goldney of Chippenham.

A grange farm at Lower Seagry, near Christian Malford, had been associated with the priory.

== Recent history ==
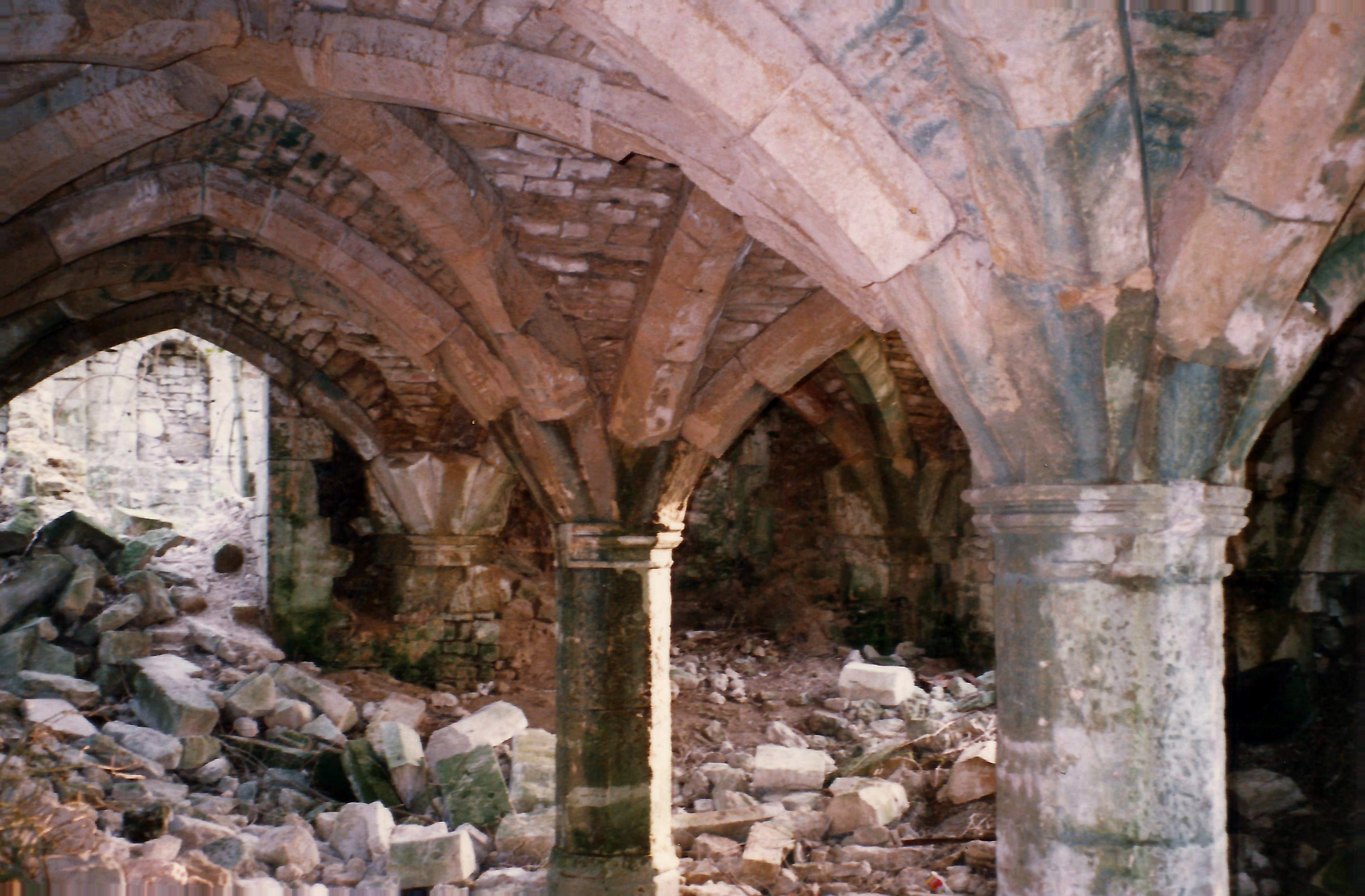
The undercroft

In 1925, the American newspaper tycoon William Randolph Hearst saw St Donat's Castle in the Vale of Glamorgan advertised for sale in Country Life magazine and cabled his English agent to buy it. For his project to enlarge the castle, he bought and removed the guest house, Prior's lodging, and great tithe barn of Bradenstoke Priory; of these, some of the materials were used to construct a banqueting hall, complete with a 16th-century French chimneypiece and windows. Also taken to the castle were a fireplace dated to c. 1514 and a 14th-century roof, which became part of the Bradenstoke Hall, despite this use being questioned in Parliament. The demolition of the priory had been strongly opposed by the Society for the Protection of Ancient Buildings, including a poster campaign on the London Underground.

The tithe barn was crated and sent to Hearst Castle, San Simeon, California, and sold again when Hearst lost interest. Around 1960, the crates with the barn's roof timbers were acquired by a hotelier, Alex Madonna of San Luis Obispo, California; in 1998 there were said to be 109 of them. The crates were still in storage in 2008.

== Present-day remains ==
All that remains of the priory in the 21st century are its tower and undercroft, the latter being identified by English Heritage in its 1996–97 programme as being at risk and requiring emergency remedial works. It was announced in 2005 that the Department for Environment, Food and Rural Affairs would finance a programme to preserve the orchard and landscape around the remains.

The undercroft was placed on the Heritage at Risk Register by Historic England, the successor to English Heritage. This enabled grants in 2017 and 2019 to assist the owner with two phases of work: initial propping, waterproofing and investigative works, followed by a substantial restoration project to repair and stabilise the ruins. This work was completed in January 2020, and the site was removed from the Register in 2020.

== Images of the priory before its removal, from Brakspear (1923) ==
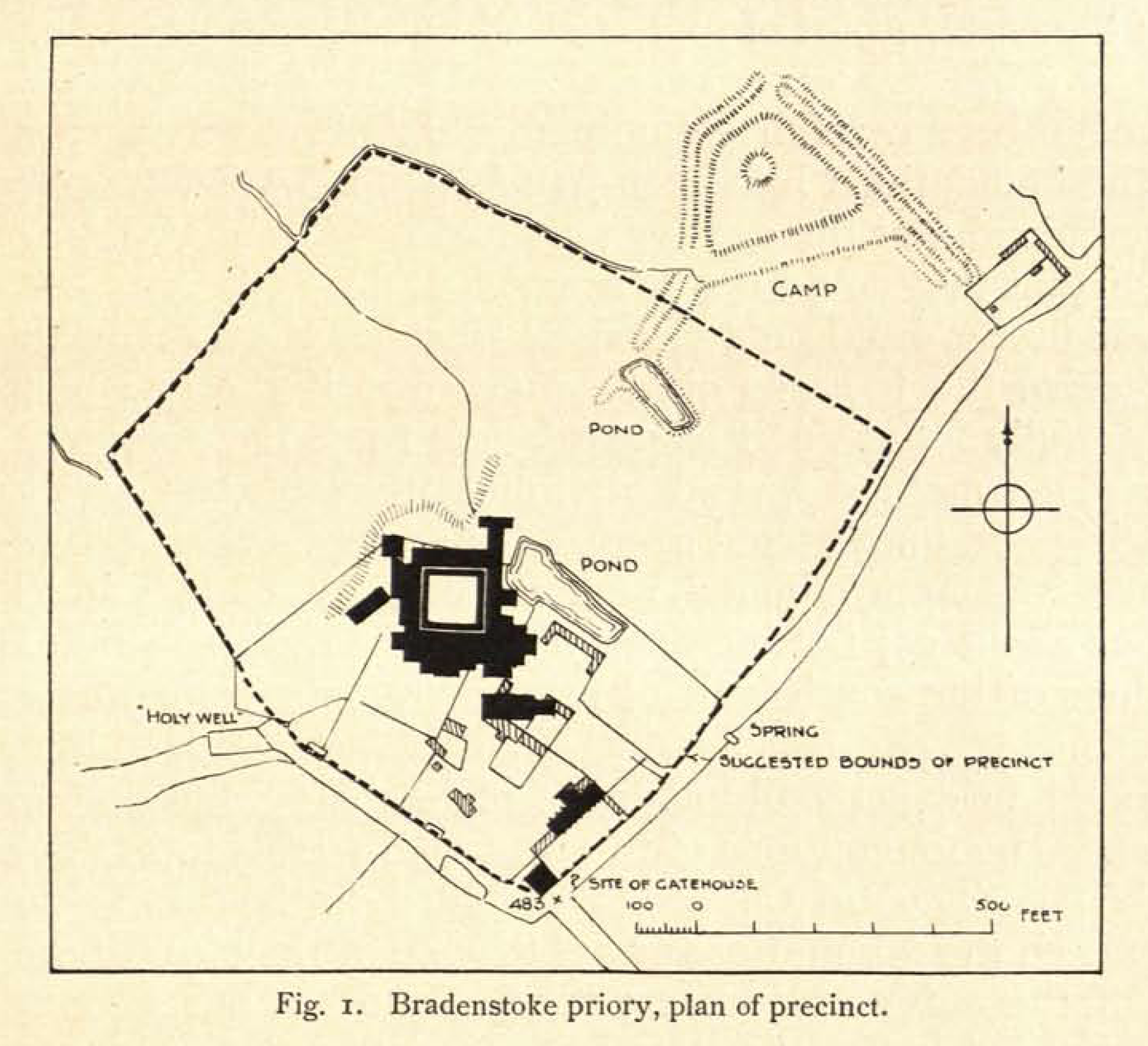

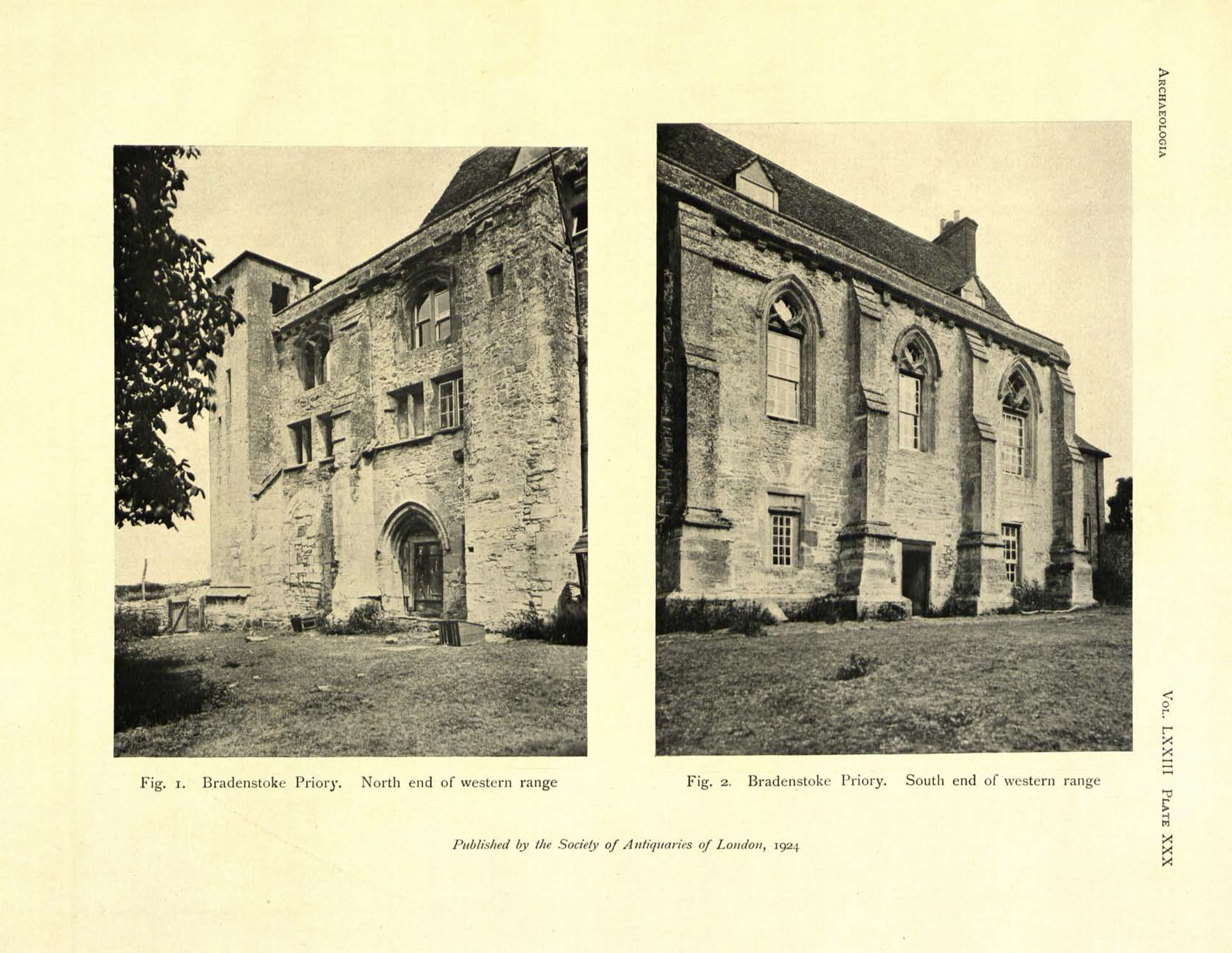

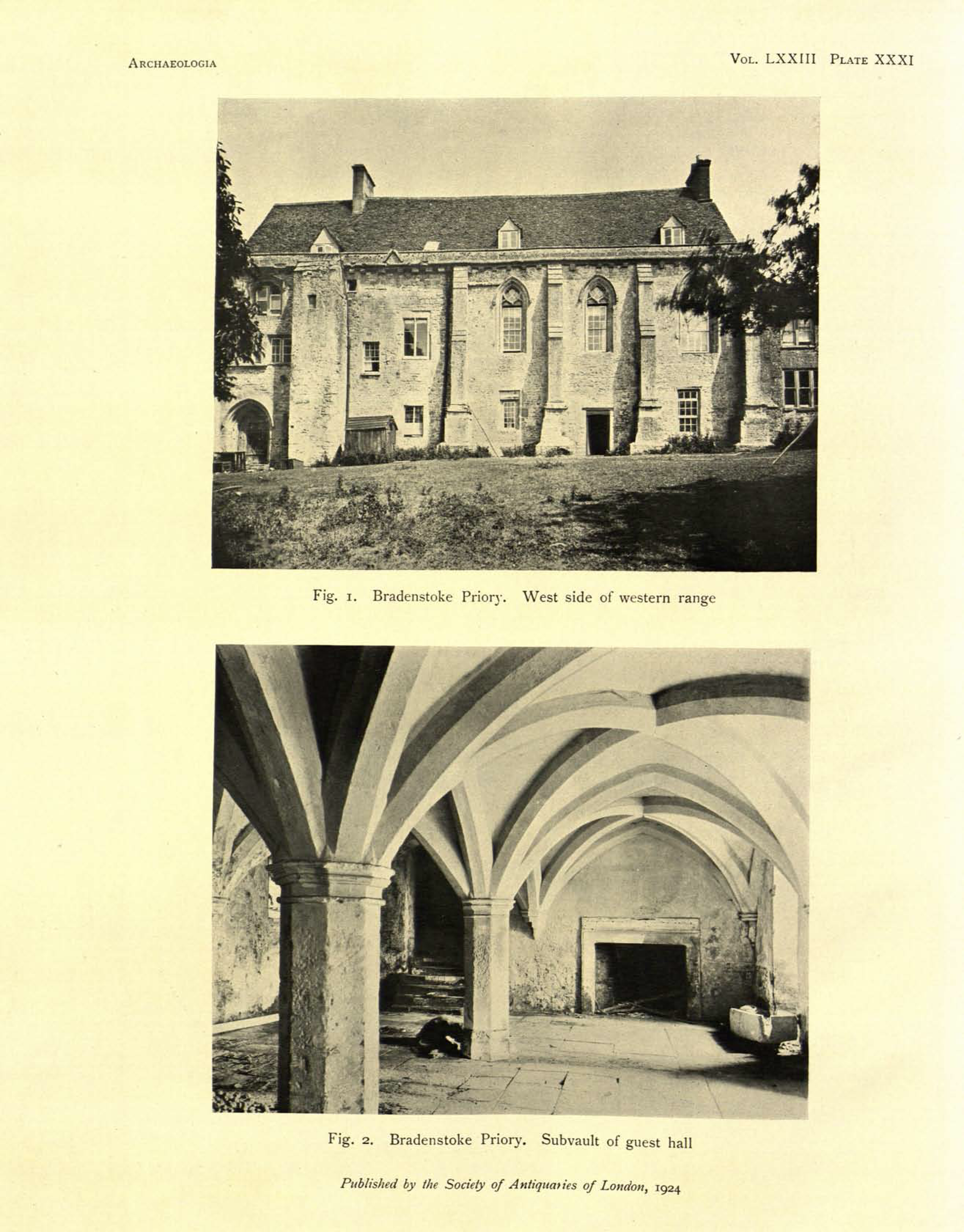

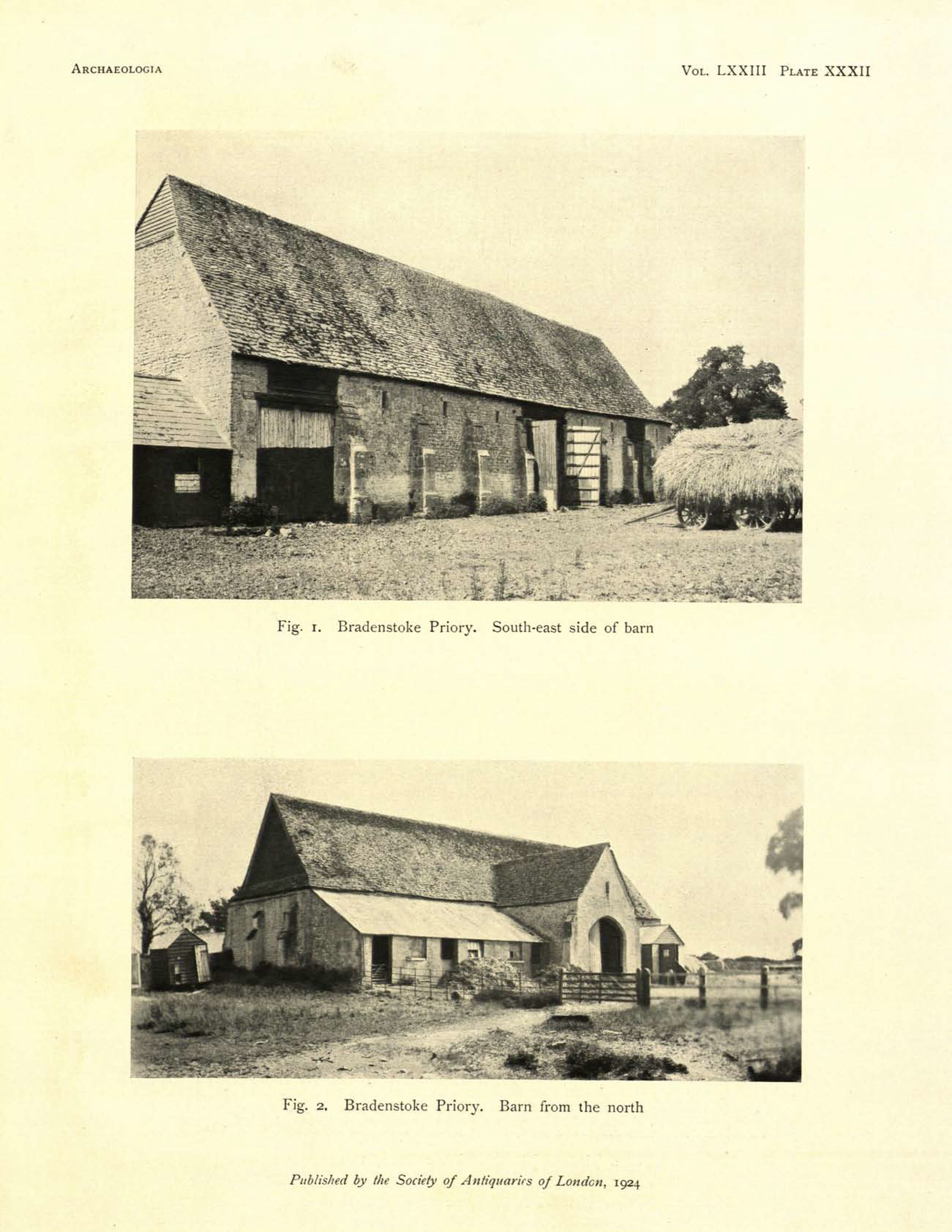

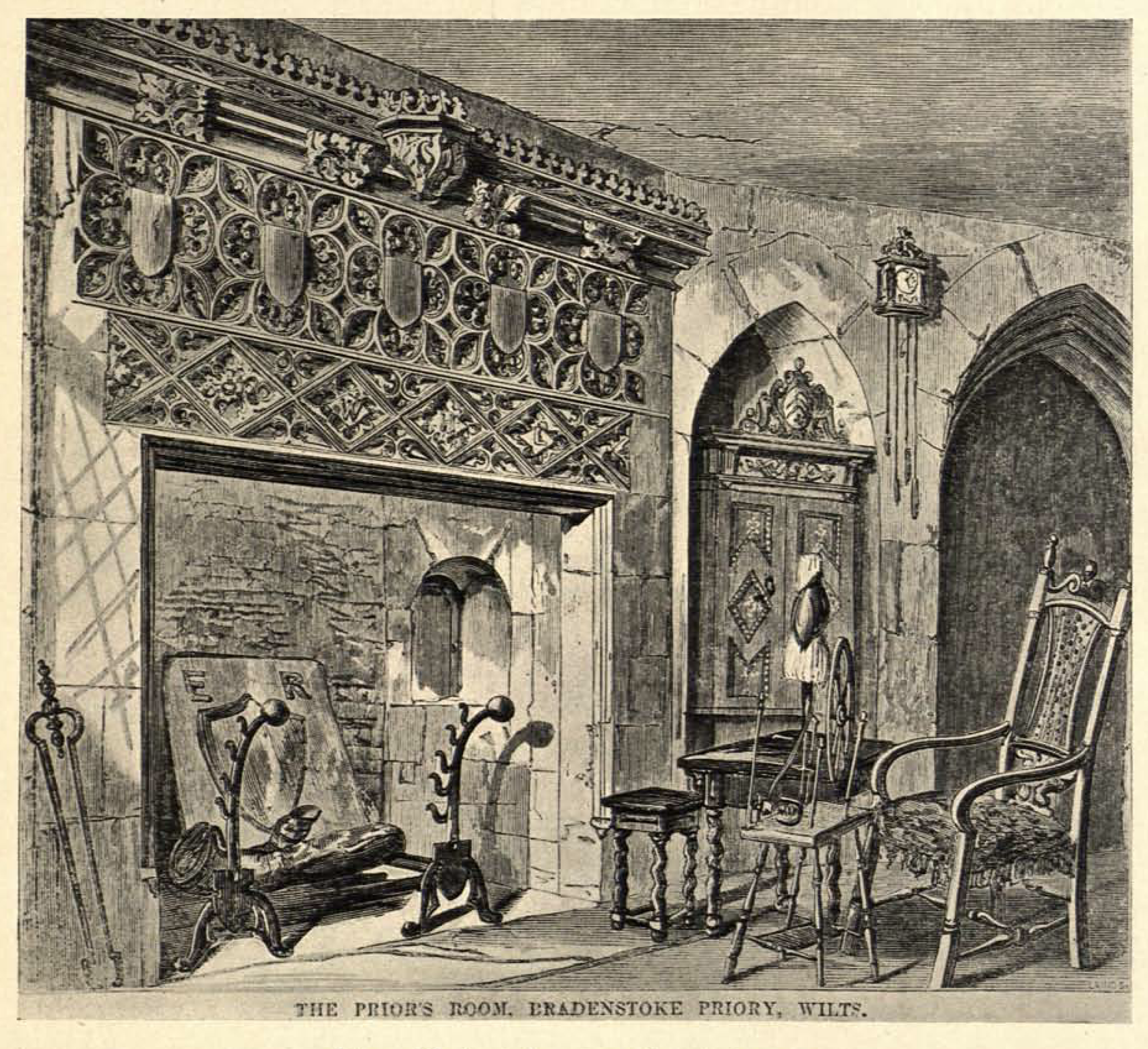

== See also ==
- Wyntoon – Hearst family estate in California
